= Classification of transgender people =

Terms used in medicine and psychiatry

The classification of transgender people (transgender women specifically) into distinct groups has been attempted since the mid-1960s. The most common modern classifications in use are the DSM-5 and ICD, which are mainly used for insurance and administration of gender-affirming care.

== History ==
During the 20th century, the Western medical community endorsed a binary concept of gender in which males and females were seen as naturally distinct in terms of gender expression. During this time, people who were assigned male at birth (AMAB) and expressed gender nonconformity were often classified into one of two subgroups. One group comprised males expressing feminine traits from early childhood, along with attraction to men and the desire to become a woman; this group has been referred to as classical, type 1, or homosexual transsexuals. The second group comprised males who often did not have strong cross-gendered childhoods, were often sexually attracted to women, and sought sex reassignment later in life; this group has been referred to as non-classical or heterosexual transexuals, and often described as transvestites. More recently, these two subgroups have been referred to as androphilic and gynephilic, respectively. Other classifications are used relative to one's gender identity rather than assigned sex.

The United States has seen increasing social trends since the early 21st century that allow for less rigid expression of one's own gender identity, and gender-nonconforming people may express a range of masculine and feminine traits. The term transgender has become more common in part to reflect such diversity of gender expression.

== Sex Orientation Scale (1966) ==
Harry Benjamin created the Sex Orientation Scale (SOS) to classify and understand various forms and subtypes of transvestism and transsexualism in transfeminine populations. It was a seven-point scale with three types of transvestism, three types of transsexualism, and one category for typical males. Benjamin's scale references and uses the Kinsey scale in distinguishing between "true transsexualism" and "transvestism".

Group	Type	Name	Kinsey scale	Conversion operation?
1	I	Transvestite (Pseudo)	0-6	Not considered in reality
1	II	Transvestite (Fetishistic)	0-2	Rejected
1	III	Transvestite (True)	0-2	Actually rejected, but idea can be attractive
2	IV	Transsexual (Nonsurgical)	1-4	Attractive but not requested or attraction not admitted
3	V	True transsexual (Moderate intensity)	4-6	Requested, usually indicated
3	VI	True transsexual (High intensity)	6	Urgently requested and usually attained; indicated

Benjamin noted, "It must be emphasized again that the remaining six types are not and never can be sharply separated." Benjamin added a caveat: "It has been the intention here to point out the possibility of several conceptions and classifications of the transvestitic and the transsexual phenomenon. Future studies and observations may decide which one is likely to come closest to the truth and in this way a possible understanding of the etiology may be gained."

== Diagnostic and Statistical Manual (1980) ==
=== DSM-III ===
Gender identity disorder
- Other names: Gender dysphoria
- Specialty: Psychiatry

Transsexualism was included for the first time in the DSM-III in 1980.

"Gender Identity Disorder" was a term created in the DSM-III in regard to transsexuals, and the categories were "GID/Children Transsexualism"; "GID/Adolescent and Adult, Non-transsexual type" and "GID/Not Otherwise Specified". Interestingly, in the major revision of the DSM, DSM-III-R, they were placed in the category "Disorders Usually First Evident in Infancy, Childhood or Adolescence". The problem was that it got lost here, as well as the issue of adult onset explained above.

In the DSM-III, the terms "Homosexual", "Heterosexual", and "Asexual" were used - with quite a bit of confusion. (These terms were replaced in the DSM-IV by "Attracted to males", "Attracted to Females", "Attracted to Both" and "Attracted to neither.")

=== DSM-III-R ===
The DSM-III-R, published in 1987, retained the term transsexualism. It was located under "Disorders Usually First Evident in Infancy, Childhood or Adolescence".

=== DSM-IV and DSM-IV-TR ===
Gender Identity Disorder in Adolescents and Adults replaced the term transsexualism. In the DSM-IV-TR, GID is placed in the category of Sexual Disorders, with the subcategory of Gender Identity Disorders. The names were changed in DSM-IV to "Gender Identity Disorder in Children", "Gender Identity Disorder in Adolescents or Adults", and "Gender Identity Disorder Not Otherwise Specified". The DSM-IV was published in 1994 and revised (DSM-IV-TR), in a minor way, in 2000. The French translation is edited by Masson.

=== DSM-5 ===
In the DSM-5, gender identity disorder was replaced with gender dysphoria; the focus is no longer on identity, but on the distress that trans people may experience when their biological sexes do not line up with said identities. Persons with gender dysphoria are also no longer classified by sexuality. The DSM-5 was published in 2013 in United States and in 2015 in France.

=== DSM-5-TR ===
Among other changes, the DSM-5-TR removed the terms "natal male" and "natal female", and replaced them with "individual assigned male at birth" and "individual assigned female at birth", respectively. The term "cross-sex" was also removed and replaced with "gender affirming".

== International Classification of Diseases ==
The International Classification of Diseases (most commonly known by the abbreviation ICD) is according to its publisher, the United Nations-sponsored World Health Organization "the standard diagnostic tool for epidemiology, health management and clinical purposes." It is known as a health care classification system that provides codes to classify diseases and a wide variety of signs, symptoms, abnormal findings, complaints, social circumstances, and external causes of injury or disease. Under this system, every health condition can be assigned to a unique category and given a code, up to six characters long. Such categories can include a set of similar diseases.

The International Classification of Diseases is published by the World Health Organization (WHO) and used worldwide for morbidity and mortality statistics, reimbursement systems, and automated decision support in health care. This system is designed to promote international comparability in the collection, processing, classification, and presentation of these statistics. The ICD is a core classification of the WHO Family of International Classifications (WHO-FIC).

The ICD is revised periodically and is currently in its eleventh revision. Annual minor updates and triennial major updates of the ICD are published by the WHO.

=== ICD-10 ===
The ICD-10 was developed in 1992 to track health statistics. The ICD is part of a "family" of guides that can be used to complement each other, including also the International Classification of Functioning, Disability and Health which focuses on the domains of functioning (disability) associated with health conditions, from both medical and social perspectives.

In the ICD-10, transsexualism is located within Gender identity disorders, F64 in ICD-10 Chapter V: Mental and behavioural disorders under the heading "Disorders of adult personality and behaviour".

=== ICD-11 for Mortality and Morbidity Statistics (2018) ===
In the eleventh revision of the ICD, published in June 2018, F64 Gender identity disorders and F65.1 Fetishistic Transvestism were removed, among other sexual practices, that used to be referred to as paraphilias. These codes were replaced in part by code HA60 Gender incongruence of adolescence or adulthood, which refers to the three conditions that classify the condition of gender dysphoria. The last sentence from code HA60 states "Gender variant behavior and preferences alone are not a basis for assigning the diagnosis."

== Blanchard's typology ==
Blanchard's transsexualism typology (also Blanchard autogynephilia theory (BAT) and Blanchard's taxonomy) is a psychological typology of male-to-female transsexualism conceived and further elaborated by Ray Blanchard through the 1980s and 1990s, building on the work of his colleague, Kurt Freund. Blanchard divides male-to-female (MtF or M2F) transsexuals into two different groups: "homosexual transsexuals", who are attracted to men, and "non-homosexual transsexuals", who are "autogynephilic" (sexually aroused by the thought or image of themselves as a woman).

Scientific criticism of the research and theory has come from John Bancroft, Jaimie Veale, Larry Nuttbrock, Charles Allen Moser, and others who argue that the theory is poorly representative of MtF transgender people, reduces gender identity to a matter of attraction, is non-instructive, and that the research cited in support of the theory has inadequate control groups or is contradicted by other data. Supporters of the theory include Anne Lawrence, J. Michael Bailey, James Cantor, and others who argue that there are significant differences between the two groups, including sexuality, age of transition, ethnicity, IQ, fetishism, and quality of adjustment.

The theory has been the subject of protests in the transgender community, although it has its supporters. The issues with Blanchard's work were again the subject of criticism with the publication of Bailey's The Man Who Would Be Queen in 2003. In 2005, Blanchard distanced himself from Bailey's affirmation of the scientific certainty of the cause, expressing that further research was needed before said certainty could be sufficiently justified.

A 2016 review found support for the predictions of Blanchard's typology that androphilic and gynephilic trans women have different brain phenotypes. It stated that although James Cantor seems to be right that Blanchard's predictions have been validated by two independent structural neuroimaging studies, there is "still only one study on nonhomosexual MtFs; to fully confirm the hypothesis, more independent studies on nonhomosexual MtFs are needed. A much better verification of the hypothesis could be supplied by a specifically designed study including homosexual and nonhomosexual MtFs." The review stated that "confirming Blanchard's prediction still needs a specifically designed comparison of homosexual MtF, homosexual male, and heterosexual male and female people."
