= Anne Lawrence =

American psychologist (born 1950)

Anne Alexandra Lawrence
- Born: 17 November 1950 (age 75)
- Education: Washington School of Professional Psychology, Institute for Advanced Study of Human Sexuality, University of Minnesota, University of Chicago
- Occupations: Sexologist, psychologist, anesthesiologist
- Known for: Work on transgender women, gender transition, autogynephilia, erotic target location errors, paraphilias
- Spouse: Unknown (married 1987–1995)
- Children: 2
- Website: annelawrence.com

Anne Alexandra Lawrence (born November 17, 1950) is an American psychologist, sexologist, and physician. She has published extensively on gender dysphoria, transgender people, and paraphilias.

Lawrence is a transgender woman and self-identifies as autogynephilic. Her 2013 book on autogynephilia, Men Trapped in Men's Bodies: Narratives of Autogynephilic Transsexualism, has been regarded by Ray Blanchard, who developed Blanchard's transsexualism typology, as the definitive text on the subject. Lawrence is one of the major researchers in the area of Blanchard's etiological typology of transgender women and has been one of the most major proponents of the theory. Blanchard's typology and autogynephilia are highly controversial subjects and are not accepted by many transgender women and academics. Lawrence's work also extends beyond Blanchard's typology to transgender women and to gender transition more generally.

== Personal life ==
Lawrence attended the University of Chicago from 1967 to 1971, where she earned a Bachelor of Arts (B.A.) in chemistry. She subsequently attended the University of Minnesota from 1971 to 1974, where she earned a Doctor of Medicine (M.D.). She completed internship, residency, and fellowship from 1974 to 1977 and was licensed as an anesthesiologist. She practiced in this area from 1978 to 1997, mostly at the University of Washington in Seattle, Washington. Lawrence was married from 1987 to 1995 and had two children, a son and a daughter, before separating from her wife in May 1995.

Lawrence is a trans woman. Lawrence is a proponent of Ray Blanchard's etiological typology of transgender women and personally self-identifies as autogynephilic. She has described having autogynephilic feelings and gender dysphoria from early childhood. She began privately crossdressing at age 8, which resulted in sexual arousal, and has described herself as unremarkably masculine and not feminine as a child. Lawrence came out to her parents as wanting to be a girl when she was age 14 in the 1960s. She was sent to psychotherapy, which she found to be unhelpful. Lawrence discovered Harry Benjamin's The Transsexual Phenomenon (1966) while at the University of Chicago, which was her first exposure to the concept of transgender people. She did not relate well to Benjamin's writings, as Benjamin's descriptions of trans women as being highly feminine and androphilic did not match her own presentation. Lawrence privately continued to crossdress and she self-administered estrogen off and on starting at age 18 and throughout her adulthood. She also seriously considered attempting self-castration, but ultimately did not go through with this. Lawrence suppressed her feelings about her gender identity for decades as she found nothing that spoke to her own experience and due to fears of the strong societal prejudice towards transgender people that existed at the time. She felt that transitioning would cause her to be seen as "psychotic".

In 1994, Lawrence discovered Ray Blanchard's work on transgender people and described this experience as an epiphany for her. She has said that Blanchard's writings gave her the insight and courage to undergo gender transition. Lawrence started transitioning in mid-1994, when she was age 44. She saw Marsha C. Botzer at the Ingersoll Gender Center in Seattle for psychotherapy and was diagnosed in early 1995. She was on full feminizing hormone therapy by 1995 and underwent vaginoplasty with Toby Meltzer in 1996. Following transition, Lawrence pivoted her career from anesthesiology to transgender health. From 1997 to 2001, Lawrence attended the Institute for Advanced Study of Human Sexuality and earned a Doctor of Philosophy (Ph.D.) in sexology. From 2003 to 2006, she attended the Washington School of Professional Psychology and earned a Master of Arts (M.A.) in clinical psychology. Starting in 1996, Lawrence published extensively in the areas of gender dysphoria, transgender people, and paraphilias, both in academic journals and on her personal website, Transsexual Women's Resources. From 2000 to 2015, she maintained a private practice in transgender medicine and psychotherapy. From 2008 until at least 2017, she was an adjunct associate professor in the Department of Psychology at the University of Lethbridge in Alberta.

Lawrence was involved in the controversy surrounding J. Michael Bailey's 2003 book The Man Who Would Be Queen: The Science of Gender-Bending and Transsexualism. Lawrence defended Bailey and Blanchard's typology and has described feeling traumatized and alienated from transgender community following the backlash against the book.

Lawrence retired from practice in 2015. She was last published in 2018. In 2023, Lawrence debuted a new version of her website and stated that she is working on a new research project of long-term narratives by self-described autogynephilic transgender women who had transitioned more than 10 years ago, which was removed months later.

As of 2023, Lawrence resides in Seattle, Washington with her two cats.

== Work ==
Lawrence is a proponent of Ray Blanchard's etiological typology of transgender women and self-identifies as an autogynephilic transgender woman. Along with Ray Blanchard and J. Michael Bailey, she is one of the major researchers in the area of Blanchard's typology (also sometimes referred to as the "Blanchard–Bailey–Lawrence" typology), and of autogynephilia particularly. Lawrence has proposed that autogynephilia is not only sexual in nature, but also encompasses elements and feelings of romantic love, much like gynephilia.

Blanchard's typology and autogynephilia are highly controversial subjects, and are rejected and viewed as offensive by many transgender women. Critiques have been lobbied at these constructs on a variety of grounds. Some transgender women, most notably Lawrence herself, identify with autogynephilia and feel that it accurately describes their experiences. Lawrence wrote a 2013 book on autogynephilia called Men Trapped in Men's Bodies: Narratives of Autogynephilic Transsexualism. This book includes over 300 first-person narratives of autogynephilia by trans women and cisgender men that were submitted to and collected by Lawrence via her website. Lawrence stated in 2022 that all her life she had an absence of narratives that gave meaning to her own experience, and this was her motivation for writing the book. It has been regarded by Blanchard as the definitive text on the subject of autogynephilia, and he has compared it to Magnus Hirschfeld's classic 1910 work, Die Transvestiten: Eine Untersuchung über den Erotischen Verkleidungstrieb (Transvestites: The Erotic Drive to Cross-Dress).

Besides her book, Lawrence has published numerous literature reviews on autogynephilia, Blanchard's typology, erotic target location errors, paraphilias, gender dysphoria, transgender people, and gender transition. She has published multiple clinical studies on transgender women, gender transition, autogynephilia, and paraphilias. Lawrence has defended Blanchard's typology against opposition and critiqued studies that contradict the typology. She has also challenged claims by some, such as sexologist Charles Allen Moser, that cisgender women experience autogynephilia similarly to transgender women. She has critiqued the theory of the structure of the brain being a cause of gender incongruence, at least applied to trans women who she considers autogynephilic. In 2009, Lawrence published a case report of autoandrophilia in a gay man.

Lawrence has been a member of the American Medical Association and the International Academy of Sex Research and has served on the board of directors of the Society for the Scientific Study of Sexuality. She has been a member of the World Professional Association for Transgender Health since 1995. Lawrence was a consultant for the fifth version (1998), a coauthor of the sixth version (2001), and provided limited recommendations for the seventh version (2012) of the WPATH Standards of Care for gender dysphoria and transgender people. She worked to help liberalize the Standards of Care and to reduce barriers to care, especially for trans women who are labelled autogynephilic. Besides the Standards of Care, Lawrence provided input on gender dysphoria and transgender people to the 2013 Diagnostic and Statistical Manual of Mental Disorders, Fifth Edition (DSM-5). She subsequently criticized some of the decisions for this area of the DSM-5 after it was published.

Lawrence previously maintained a personal website with information for transgender women called Transsexual Women's Resources.

== Selected publications ==
=== Books ===
- Anne A. Lawrence (2013). Men Trapped in Men's Bodies: Narratives of Autogynephilic Transsexualism (PDF). Focus on Sexuality Research. Springer Science & Business Media. doi:10.1007/978-1-4614-5182-2. ISBN 978-1-4614-5182-2. OCLC 910979847. Archived from the original (PDF) on 2024-03-23.

=== Papers ===
- Lawrence, Anne A. (2004). "Autogynephilia: A Paraphilic Model of Gender Identity Disorder" (PDF). Journal of Gay and Lesbian Psychotherapy. 8 (1/2): 69–87. CiteSeerX 10.1.1.656.9256. doi:10.1080/19359705.2004.9962367. Archived from the original (PDF) on 2024-03-23.
- Lawrence, Anne A. (2006). "Clinical and Theoretical Parallels Between Desire for Limb Amputation and Gender Identity Disorder" (PDF). Archives of Sexual Behavior. 35 (3): 263–278. doi:10.1007/s10508-006-9026-6. ISSN 0004-0002. PMID 16799838. S2CID 17528273. Archived from the original (PDF) on 2024-03-23.
- Lawrence, Anne A. (2007). "Becoming What We Love: Autogynephilic Transsexualism Conceptualized as an Expression of Romantic Love" (PDF). Perspect. Biol. Med. 50 (4): 506–520. doi:10.1353/pbm.2007.0050. PMID 17951885. S2CID 31767722. Archived from the original (PDF) on 2023-12-11.
- Lawrence, Anne A. (2009). "Erotic Target Location Errors: An Underappreciated Paraphilic Dimension" (PDF). Journal of Sex Research. 46 (2–3): 194–215. doi:10.1080/00224490902747727. ISSN 0022-4499. JSTOR 20620414. PMID 19308843. S2CID 10105602. Archived from the original (PDF) on 2024-04-15.
- Lawrence, Anne A. (2009). "Transgenderism in Nonhomosexual Males As a Paraphilic Phenomenon: Implications for Case Conceptualization and Treatment" (PDF). Sexual and Relationship Therapy. 24 (2): 188–206. doi:10.1080/14681990902937340. ISSN 1468-1994.
- Lawrence, Anne A. (2011). "Autogynephilia: An Underappreciated Paraphilia" (PDF). Advances in Psychosomatic Medicine. 31: 135–148. doi:10.1159/000328921. ISBN 978-3-8055-9825-5. ISSN 1662-2855. PMID 22005209. S2CID 16143265. Archived from the original (PDF) on 2023-12-11.
- Lawrence, Anne A. (2017). "Autogynephilia and the Typology of Male-to-Female Transsexualism: Concepts and Controversies" (PDF). European Psychologist. 22 (1): 39–54. doi:10.1027/1016-9040/a000276. ISSN 1016-9040. S2CID 151624961. Archived from the original (PDF) on 2024-04-24.
- Anne A. Lawrence (October 2023). "Becoming What We Love: Autogynephilic Sexual Orientation" (PDF). annelawrence.com. Archived from the original (PDF) on 2023-12-11.
