= Causes of gender incongruence =

Gender incongruence is the state of having a gender identity that does not correspond to one's sex assigned at birth. This is experienced by people who identify as transgender or transsexual, and often results in gender dysphoria. The causes of gender incongruence have been studied for decades, but are generally not well-understood.

Transgender brain studies are limited, particularly those on gynephilic trans women (attracted to women), and androphilic trans men (attracted to men), as they include only a small number of tested individuals. Twin studies indicate that genes play a role in gender incongruence, although the exact genes involved are not known.

Environmental factors, such as prenatal hormone exposure, have also been investigated but are difficult to test.

== Genetics ==
Gender identity is genetically heritable, but no convincing candidate genes are known. Gender incongruence has been associated with certain alleles relevant to steroidogenesis.

In 2013, a twin study combined a survey of pairs of twins where one or both had undergone, or had plans and medical approval to undergo, gender transition, with a literature review of published reports of transgender twins. The study found that one third of identical twin pairs in the sample were both transgender: 13 of 39 (33%) monozygotic or identical pairs of twins who were assigned male at birth, and 8 of 35 (22.8%) pairs assigned female. Among dizygotic or genetically non-identical twin pairs, there was only 1 of 38 (2.6%) pairs where both twins were trans. The significant percentage of identical twin pairs in which both twins are trans and the virtual absence of dizygotic twins (raised in the same family at the same time) in which both were trans would provide evidence that transgender identity is significantly influenced by genetics if both sets were raised in different families.

A 2018 review of family and twin studies found that there was "significant and consistent evidence" for gender identity being genetically heritable.

== Prenatal hormonal environment ==
Sex hormones in the prenatal environment differentiate the male and female brain. One hypothesis proposes that transgender individuals may have been exposed to atypical levels of sex hormones during later stages of fetal development, leading to brain structures atypical of their sex assigned at birth.

In people with XX chromosomes, congenital adrenal hyperplasia (CAH) results in heightened exposure to prenatal androgens, resulting in masculinization of the genitalia. Individuals with CAH are typically subjected to medical interventions including prenatal hormone treatment and postnatal genital reconstructive surgeries. Such treatments are sometimes criticized by intersex rights organizations as non-consensual, invasive, and unnecessary interventions. Individuals with CAH are usually assigned female and tend to develop similar cognitive abilities to the typical females, including spatial ability, verbal ability, language lateralization, handedness and aggression. Research has shown that people with CAH and XX chromosomes will be more likely to experience same-sex attraction, and at least 5.2% of these individuals develop serious gender dysphoria.

In males with 5-alpha-reductase deficiency, conversion of testosterone to dihydrotestosterone is disrupted, decreasing the masculinization of genitalia. Individuals with this condition are typically assigned female and raised as girls due to their feminine appearance at a young age. However, more than half of males with this condition raised as females come to identify as male later in life. Scientists speculate that the definition of masculine characteristics during puberty and the increased social status afforded to men are two possible motivations for a female-to-male transition.

== Brain structure ==
Transgender brain studies, especially those on trans women attracted to women (gynephilic), and those on trans men attracted to men (androphilic), are limited, as they include only a small number of tested individuals.

Several studies have found a correlation between gender identity and brain structure. A first-of-its-kind study by Zhou et al. (1995) found that in the bed nucleus of the stria terminalis (BSTc), a region of the brain known for sex and anxiety responses (and which is affected by prenatal androgens), cadavers of six trans women had female-normal BSTc size, similar to the study's cadavers of cisgender women. While the trans women had undergone hormone therapy, and all but one had undergone sex reassignment surgery, this was accounted for by including cadavers of cisgender men and cisgender women as controls who, for a variety of medical reasons, had experienced hormone reversal. The controls still had sizes typical for their sex, and thus no relationship to post-natal hormone levels (nor to sexual orientation) was found. Other post-mortem studies also found brain differences between cisgender and transgender individuals.

In 2002, a follow-up study by Chung et al. found that significant sexual dimorphism in BSTc did not establish until adulthood. Chung et al. theorized that changes in fetal hormone levels produce changes in BSTc synaptic density, neuronal activity, or neurochemical content which later lead to size and neuron count changes in BSTc, or alternatively, that the size of BSTc is affected by the generation of a gender identity inconsistent with one's assigned sex.

In the textbook Adult Psychopathology and Diagnosis, 7th edition, Lawrence and Zucker suggested that the BSTc may not be a valid biomarker for gender incongruence, as differences in size could be caused by gender-affirming hormone therapy or paraphilias, and might not occur in homosexual transsexuals.

In a review of the evidence in 2006, Gooren considered the earlier research as supporting the concept of gender incongruence as a "sexual differentiation disorder" of the sexually dimorphic brain. Dick Swaab (2004) concurred.

In 2008, Garcia-Falgueras & Swaab discovered that the interstitial nucleus of the anterior hypothalamus (INAH-3), part of the hypothalamic uncinate nucleus, had properties similar to the BSTc with respect to sexual dimorphism and gender incongruence, likewise in line with the trans individuals' declared genders and likewise regardless of if hormonal transition had occurred or not.

A 2009 MRI study by Luders et al. found that among 24 trans women not treated with hormone therapy, regional gray matter concentrations were more similar to those of cisgender men than of cisgender women, but there was a significantly greater volume of gray matter in the right putamen compared to cisgender men. Like earlier studies, researchers concluded that transgender identity was associated with a distinct cerebral pattern. MRI scanning allows easier study of larger brain structures, but independent nuclei are not visible due to lack of contrast between different neurological tissue types, hence other studies on e.g. BSTc were done by dissecting brains post-mortem.

Rametti et al. (2011) studied 18 trans men who had not undergone hormone therapy using diffusion tensor imaging (DTI), an MRI technique which allows visualizing white matter, the structure of which is sexually dimorphic. Rametti et al. discovered that the trans men's white matter, compared to 19 cisgender gynephilic females, showed higher fractional anisotropy values in posterior part of the right SLF, the forceps minor and corticospinal tract". Compared to 24 cisgender males, they showed only lower FA values in the corticospinal tract. The white matter patterns in trans men were found to be shifted in the direction of cis men.

A 2011 review published in Frontiers in Neuroendocrinology found that "Female INAH3 and BSTc have been found in MtF transsexual persons. The only female-to-male (FtM) transsexual person available to us for study so far had a BSTc and INAH3 with clear male characteristics. (...) These sex reversals were found not to be influenced by circulating hormone levels in adulthood, and seem thus to have arisen during development" and that "All observations that support the neurobiological theory about the origin of transsexuality, i.e. that it is the sizes, the neuron numbers, and the functions and connectivity of brain structures, not the sex of their sexual organs, birth certificates or passports, that match their gender identities".

In 2012 and 2016 studies by Taziaux et al. reported that MtF subjects had infundibular nuclei similar to those of cis women.

A 2015 review reported that two studies found a pattern of white matter microstructure differences away from a transgender person's birth sex, and toward their desired sex. In one of these studies, sexual orientation had no effect on the diffusivity measured.

A 2016 review reported that, for androphilic trans women and gynephilic trans men, hormone treatment may have large effects on the brain, and that cortical thickness, which is generally thicker in cisgender women's brains than in cisgender men's brains, may also be thicker in trans women's brains, but is present in a different location to cisgender women's brains. It also stated that for both trans women and trans men, "cross-sex hormone treatment affects the gross morphology as well as the white matter microstructure of the brain. Changes are to be expected when hormones reach the brain in pharmacological doses. Consequently, one cannot take hormone-treated transsexual brain patterns as evidence of the transsexual brain phenotype because the treatment alters brain morphology and obscures the pre-treatment brain pattern."

A 2019 review in Neuropsychopharmacology found that among transgender individuals meeting diagnostic criteria for gender dysphoria, "cortical thickness, gray matter volume, white matter microstructure, structural connectivity, and corpus callosum shape have been found to be more similar to cisgender control subjects of the same preferred gender compared with those of the same natal sex."

A 2021 review of brain studies published in the Archives of Sexual Behavior found that "although the majority of neuroanatomical, neurophysiological, and neurometabolic features" in transgender people "resemble those of their natal sex rather than those of their experienced gender", for trans women they found feminine and demasculinized traits, and vice versa for trans men. They stated that due to limitations and conflicting results in the studies that had been done, they could not draw general conclusions or identify specific features that consistently differed between cisgender and transgender people. The review also found differences when comparing cisgender homosexual and heterosexual people, with the same limitations applying.

=== Androphilic vs. gynephilic trans women ===
A 2016 review reported that early-onset androphilic transgender women have a brain structure similar to cisgender women's and unlike cisgender men's, but that they have their own brain phenotype. It also reported that gynephilic trans women differ from both cisgender female and male controls in non-dimorphic brain areas.

The available research indicates that the brain structure of androphilic trans women with early-onset gender dysphoria is closer to that of cisgender women than that of cisgender men. It also reports that gynephilic trans women differ from both cisgender female and male controls in non-dimorphic brain areas. Cortical thickness, which is generally thicker in cisgender women's brains than in cisgender men's brains, may also be thicker in trans women's brains, but is present in a different location to cisgender women's brains. For trans men, research indicates that those with early-onset gender dysphoria and who are gynephilic have brains that generally correspond to their assigned sex, but that they have their own phenotype with respect to cortical thickness, subcortical structures, and white matter microstructure, especially in the right hemisphere. Hormone therapy can also affect transgender people's brain structure; estrogen can cause transgender women's brains to become closer to those of cisgender women, and morphological changes observed in the brains of trans men might be due to the anabolic effects of testosterone.

MRI taken on gynephilic trans women have likewise shown differences in the brain from non-trans people, though in ways not directly related to sexual dimorphism.

=== Gynephilic trans men ===
Fewer brain structure studies have been performed on transgender men than on transgender women. A 2016 review reported that the brain structure of early-onset gynephilic trans men generally corresponds to their assigned sex, but that they have their own phenotype with respect to cortical thickness, subcortical structures, and white matter microstructure, especially in the right hemisphere. Morphological increments observed in the brains of trans men might be due to the anabolic effects of testosterone.

== Onset ==
According to the DSM-5, gender dysphoria in those assigned male at birth tends to follow one of two broad trajectories: early-onset or late-onset. Early-onset gender dysphoria is behaviorally visible in childhood. Sometimes, gender dysphoria may stop for a while in this group, and they may identify as gay or homosexual for a period of time, followed by recurrence of gender dysphoria. This group is usually androphilic in adulthood. Late-onset gender dysphoria does not include visible signs in early childhood, but some report having had wishes to be the opposite sex in childhood that they did not report to others. Trans women who experience late-onset gender dysphoria are more likely be attracted to women and may identify as lesbians or bisexual. It is common for people assigned male at birth who have late-onset gender dysphoria to experience sexual excitement from cross-dressing. In those assigned female at birth, early-onset gender dysphoria is the most common course. This group is usually sexually attracted to women. Trans men who experience late-onset gender dysphoria will usually be sexually attracted to men and may identify as gay. In general, onset of symptoms may begin at any time after an individual reaches the age of two or three.

== Blanchard's typology ==
In the 1980s and 1990s, sexologist Ray Blanchard developed a taxonomy of male-to-female transsexualism built upon the work of his colleague Kurt Freund, which argues that trans women have one of two primary causes of gender dysphoria. Blanchard theorized that "homosexual transsexuals" (a taxonomic category referring to trans women attracted to men) are attracted to men and develop gender dysphoria typically during childhood, and characterizes them as displaying overt and obvious femininity since childhood; he characterizes "non-homosexual transsexuals" (trans women who are sexually attracted to women) as developing gender dysphoria primarily due to autogynephilia (sexual arousal by the thought or image of themselves as a woman), and as attracted to women, attracted to both women and men (Blanchard calls this "pseudo-bisexuality", believing attraction to males to be not genuine, but part of the performance of an autogynephilic sexual fantasy), or asexual.

Blanchard's theory has received support from J. Michael Bailey, Anne Lawrence, and James Cantor. Blanchard argued that there are significant differences between the two groups, including sexuality, age of transition, ethnicity, IQ, fetishism, and quality of adjustment.

Blanchard's typology has been criticized in papers from Veale, Nuttbrock, Moser, and others who argue that it is poorly representative of trans women and non-instructive, and that the experiments behind it are poorly controlled and/or contradicted by other data. Charles Moser conducted a survey of 29 cisgender women in the healthcare field based on Blanchard's methods for identifying autogynephilia, found that 93% of respondents qualified as autogynephiles based on their own responses. Anne Lawrence criticized the methodology of Mosers survey.

Blanchard proposed that "homosexual transsexuals", but not "autogynephilic transsexuals", would have feminized brain structure, stating: "if there is any neuroanatomic intersexuality, it is in the homosexual group". James Cantor has argued that MRI studies of transgender women offer support for Blanchard's prediction. A 2016 review of transgender brain structure states: "Cantor seems to be right. Nonhomosexual MtFs present differences with heterosexual males in structures that are not sexually dimorphic (Savic & Arver, 2011), while homosexual MtFs (as well as homosexual FtMs) show differences with respect to male and female controls in a series of brain fascicles". The review notes that only one study has compared gynephilic and androphilic transgender women, and that "more independent studies on nonhomosexual MtFs are needed".

== See also ==
- Genetic diagnosis of intersex
- Intersex and LGBT – Relationship between different sex and gender minorities
- Sexual identity – Sexual self-perception
- Neuroscience of sex differences – Characteristics of the brain that differentiate the male brain and the female brain
- Wrong-body narrative
