= Erotic target location error =

Hypothesized dimension for paraphilias

Erotic target location error (ETLE) is a hypothesized dimension for paraphilias, defined by having a sexual preference or strong sexual interest in features that are somewhere other than on one's sexual partners. When one's sexual arousal is based on imagining oneself in another physical form (such as an animal, an infant, or an amputee) the erotic target is said to be one's self, or erotic target identity inversion (ETII).

The terms "erotic target location error" and "erotic target identity inversion" were first used in 1993 by the sexologist Ray Blanchard.

== Proposed types ==
The sexologist Anne Lawrence describes as examples of erotic target identity inversions males or trans women who experience sexual arousal in response to imagining themselves as women (autogynephilia), as well as at least one case of anatomic autoandrophilia.

Blanchard writes that whereas gynephilia refers to the sexual preference for women, autogynephilia refers to a male's sexual interest in being a woman. He states that autogynephilia can be associated with gender dysphoria and gender identity disorder, discontent with one's sex and the desire to undergo surgery for sex reassignment and permanently take on a role and life of the other sex. A male with sexual arousal based on temporarily taking on the appearance or role of a woman is transvestic fetishism.

Several other sexual interests also exist in ETLE forms:

Whereas acrotomophilia refers to the sexual preference for amputees, apotemnophilia refers to sexual arousal in association with having an amputation, although both can be experienced at the same time. Apotemnophilia can be associated with the strong belief or desire that one's external body is mismatched to one's true nature, a phenomenon called body integrity identity disorder, and the desire to undergo surgery to remove a limb. People who temporarily adopt the role or identity of an amputee have been called disability pretenders.

Whereas zoophilia refers to the sexual preference for animals, autozoophilia refers to sexual arousal in association with being an animal.

The sexual attraction to plush animals is termed plushophilia. Anne Lawrence has proposed the terms autoplushophilia for the sexual attraction to being or changing one's body to have plush features, and fursuitism for sexual arousal from wearing a fursuit to temporarily resemble an anthropomorphic animal.

Whereas pedophilia refers to the sexual preference for children, paraphilic infantilism refers to the sexual interest in being a child.

Lawrence and others have posited parallels between gender identity disorder and apotemnophilia, as well as between gender identity disorder and species identity disorder.

== Criticism ==
In a letter to the editor of The Journal of Sex Research in 2009, San Francisco-based physician and activist Charles Allen Moser criticized Lawrence' endorsement of the concept of ETLEs. He noted that "there is nothing wrong with creating or expanding a classification system of sexual interests" but believed that Lawrence "pathologizes nonstandard sexual expression" and that "ETLEs are a slippery slope," whereas Moser's view is that all sexual phenomena should be removed from the Diagnostic and Statistical Manual of Mental Disorders (DSM).

== See also ==
- Objectophilia
