= Paraphilic disorder =

- Other names: Sexual perversion (1880s–1920); Sexual deviation (1952–1980; DSM and ICD)
- Specialty: Psychiatry

A paraphilic disorder is a mental disorder in which a paraphilia (sometimes called a sexual fetish or kink) involves people who do not consent, or causes marked distress which is not just due to rejection or fear of rejection, or significantly risks injury or death.

In the International Classification of Diseases, paraphilic disorders include exhibitionistic disorder, voyeuristic disorder, pedophilic disorder, coercive sexual sadism disorder, frotteuristic disorder, and other paraphilic disorders. The United States Diagnostic and Statistical Manual of Mental Disorders DSM-5-TR has a slightly different list, specifically including sexual masochism disorder and transvestic disorder.

Paraphilic disorders occur in adults and occasionally adolescents, but as the behaviour must be persistent. Many sex crimes are not due to such disorders.

== Definition ==
The International Classification of Diseases describes:

Paraphilic disorders are characterised by persistent and intense patterns of atypical sexual arousal, manifested by sexual thoughts, fantasies, urges, or behaviours, the focus of which involves others whose age or status renders them unwilling or unable to consent and on which the person has acted or by which he or she is markedly distressed. Paraphilic disorders may include arousal patterns involving solitary behaviours or consenting individuals only when these are associated with marked distress that is not simply a result of rejection or feared rejection of the arousal pattern by others or with significant risk of injury or death.

=== Definition of typical versus atypical interests ===
Clinical literature contains reports of many paraphilias, only some of which receive separate entries in the diagnostic taxonomies of the American Psychiatric Association or the World Health Organization. There is disagreement regarding which sexual interests should be deemed paraphilic disorders versus normal variants of sexual interest. The DSM-IV-TR also acknowledges that the diagnosis and classification of paraphilias across cultures or religions "is complicated by the fact that what is considered deviant in one cultural setting may be more acceptable in another setting". Some argue that cultural relativism is important to consider when discussing paraphilias because there is wide variance concerning what is sexually acceptable across cultures. Consensual adult activities and adult entertainment involving sexual roleplay; novel, superficial, or trivial aspects of sexual fetishism; or incorporating the use of sex toys are not necessarily paraphilic.

Paraphiliacs often have other psychiatric comorbidities such as depression, attachment disorders, anxiety, emotional avoidance, obsessive or compulsive behaviours and identity disorders. All of these disorders are common symptoms of physical, psychological, emotional, or sexual abuse during childhood and can be treated with appropriate psychotrauma support.

== International Classification of Diseases ==
=== ICD-6, ICD-7, ICD-8 ===
In the ICD-6 (1948) and ICD-7 (1955), a category of "sexual deviation" was listed with "other Pathological personality disorders". In the ICD-8 (1965), "sexual deviations" were categorized as homosexuality, fetishism, pedophilia, transvestism, exhibitionism, voyeurism, sadism and masochism.

=== ICD-9 ===
In the ICD-9 (1975), the category of sexual deviations and disorders was expanded to include transsexualism, sexual dysfunctions, and psychosexual identity disorders. The list contained homosexuality, bestiality, pedophilia, transvestism, exhibitionism, transsexualism, Disorders of psychosexual identity, frigidity and impotence, Other sexual deviations and disorders (including fetishism, masochism, and sadism).

=== ICD-10 ===
In the ICD-10 (1990), the category "sexual deviations and disorders" was divided into several subcategories. Paraphilias were placed in subcategory of "sexual preference disorders". The list included fetishism, fetishistic transvestism, exhibitionism, voyeurism, pedophilia, sadomasochism and other disorders of sexual preference (including frotteurism, necrophilia, and zoophilia). Homosexuality was removed from the list, but ego-dystonic sexual orientation was still considered a deviation which was placed in subcategory "psychological and behavioural disorders associated with sexual development and orientation".

=== ICD-11 ===
In the ICD-11 (2022), "paraphilia" has been replaced with "paraphilic disorder". Any paraphilia and any other arousal pattern by itself no longer constitutes a disorder. To date, the diagnosis must meet criteria of paraphilia and one of the following: 1) a marked distress associated with arousal pattern (but not one that comes from rejection or fear of rejection); 2) the person has acted on the arousal pattern towards unwilling others or others considered as unable to give consent; 3) a serious risk of injury or death. The list of the paraphilic disorders includes: Exhibitionistic Disorder, Voyeuristic Disorder, Pedophilic Disorder, Coercive Sexual Sadism Disorder, Frotteuristic Disorder, Other Paraphilic Disorder Involving Non-Consenting Individuals, and Other Paraphilic Disorder Involving Solitary Behaviour or Consenting Individuals. As of now, disorders associated with sexual orientation have been removed from the ICD. Gender issues have been removed from the mental health category and have been placed under "Conditions related to sexual health".

== Diagnostic and Statistical Manual of Mental Disorders (DSM) ==
=== DSM-I and DSM-II ===
In American psychiatry, prior to the publication of the DSM-I, paraphilias were classified as cases of "psychopathic personality with pathologic sexuality". The DSM-I (1952) included sexual deviation as a personality disorder of sociopathic subtype. The only diagnostic guidance was that sexual deviation should have been "reserved for deviant sexuality which [was] not symptomatic of more extensive syndromes, such as schizophrenic or obsessional reactions". The specifics of the disorder were to be provided by the clinician as a "supplementary term" to the sexual deviation diagnosis; there were no restrictions in the DSM-I on what this supplementary term could be. Researcher Anil Aggrawal writes that the now-obsolete DSM-I listed examples of supplementary terms for pathological behavior to include "homosexuality, transvestism, pedophilia, fetishism, and sexual sadism, including rape, sexual assault, mutilation."

The DSM-II (1968) continued to use the term sexual deviations, no longer ascribed them under personality disorders but rather alongside them in a broad category titled "personality disorders and certain other nonpsychotic mental disorders". The types of sexual deviations listed in the DSM-II were: sexual orientation disturbance (homosexuality), fetishism, pedophilia, transvestitism, exhibitionism, voyeurism, sadism, masochism, and "other sexual deviation". No definition or examples were provided for "other sexual deviation" but the general category of sexual deviation was meant to describe the sexual preference of individuals that was "directed primarily toward objects other than people of opposite sex, toward sexual acts not usually associated with coitus, or toward coitus performed under bizarre circumstances, as in necrophilia, pedophilia, sexual sadism, and fetishism." Except for the removal of homosexuality from the DSM-III onwards, this definition provided a general standard that has guided specific definitions of paraphilias in subsequent DSM editions, up to DSM-IV-TR.

=== DSM-III through DSM-IV ===
The term paraphilia was introduced in the DSM-III (1980) as a subset of the new category of "psychosexual disorders". The DSM-III-R (1987) renamed the broad category to sexual disorders, renamed atypical paraphilia to paraphilia NOS (not otherwise specified), renamed transvestism as transvestic fetishism, added frotteurism, and moved zoophilia to the NOS category. It also provided seven nonexhaustive examples of NOS paraphilias, which besides zoophilia included exhibitionism, necrophilia, partialism, coprophilia, klismaphilia, and urophilia. The DSM-IV (1994) retained the sexual disorders classification for paraphilias, but added an even broader category, "sexual and gender identity disorders", which includes them. The DSM-IV retained the same types of paraphilias listed in DSM-III-R, including the NOS examples, but introduced some changes to the definitions of some specific types.

=== DSM-IV-TR ===
The DSM-IV-TR describes paraphilias as "recurrent, intense sexually arousing fantasies, sexual urges or behaviors generally involving nonhuman objects, the suffering or humiliation of oneself or one's partner, or children or other nonconsenting persons that occur over a period of six months" (criterion A), which "cause clinically significant distress or impairment in social, occupational, or other important areas of functioning" (criterion B). DSM-IV-TR names eight specific paraphilic disorders (exhibitionism, fetishism, frotteurism, pedophilia, sexual masochism, sexual sadism, voyeurism, and transvestic fetishism, plus a residual category, paraphilia—not otherwise specified). Criterion B differs for exhibitionism, frotteurism, and pedophilia to include acting on these urges, and for sadism, acting on these urges with a nonconsenting person. Sexual arousal in association with objects that were designed for sexual purposes is not diagnosable. Some paraphilias may interfere with the capacity for sexual activity with consenting adult partners. In the current version of the Diagnostic and Statistical Manual of Mental Disorders (DSM-IV-TR), a paraphilia is not diagnosable as a psychiatric disorder unless it causes distress to the individual or harm to others.

=== DSM-5 ===
The DSM-5 adds a distinction between paraphilias and "paraphilic disorders", stating that paraphilias do not require or justify psychiatric treatment in themselves, and defining paraphilic disorder as "a paraphilia that is currently causing distress or impairment to the individual or a paraphilia whose satisfaction has entailed personal harm, or risk of harm, to others". The DSM-5 Paraphilias Subworkgroup reached a "consensus that paraphilias are not ipso facto psychiatric disorders", and proposed "that the DSM-V make a distinction between paraphilias and paraphilic disorders. One would ascertain a paraphilia (according to the nature of the urges, fantasies, or behaviors) but diagnose a paraphilic disorder (on the basis of distress and impairment). In this conception, having a paraphilia would be a necessary but not a sufficient condition for having a paraphilic disorder." The 'Rationale' page of any paraphilia in the electronic DSM-5 draft continues: "This approach leaves intact the distinction between normative and non-normative sexual behavior, which could be important to researchers, but without automatically labeling non-normative sexual behavior as psychopathological. It also eliminates certain logical absurdities in the DSM-IV-TR. In that version, for example, a man cannot be classified as a transvestite—however much he cross-dresses and however sexually exciting that is to him—unless he is unhappy about this activity or impaired by it. This change in viewpoint would be reflected in the diagnostic criteria sets by the addition of the word 'Disorder' to all the paraphilias. Thus, Sexual Sadism would become Sexual Sadism Disorder; Sexual Masochism would become Sexual Masochism Disorder, and so on."

Bioethics professor Alice Dreger interpreted these changes as "a subtle way of saying sexual kinks are basically okay – so okay, the sub-work group doesn't actually bother to define paraphilia. But a paraphilic disorder is defined: that's when an atypical sexual interest causes distress or impairment to the individual or harm to others." Interviewed by Dreger, Ray Blanchard, the Chair of the Paraphilias Sub-Work Group, stated, "We tried to go as far as we could in depathologizing mild and harmless paraphilias, while recognizing that severe paraphilias that distress or impair people or cause them to do harm to others are validly regarded as disorders." Charles Allen Moser stated that this change is not really substantive, as the DSM-IV already acknowledged a difference between paraphilias and non-pathological but unusual sexual interests, a distinction that is virtually identical to what was being proposed for DSM-5, and it is a distinction that, in practice, has often been ignored. Linguist Andrew Clinton Hinderliter argued that "including some sexual interests—but not others—in the DSM creates a fundamental asymmetry and communicates a negative value judgment against the sexual interests included," and leaves the paraphilias in a situation similar to ego-dystonic homosexuality, which was removed from the DSM because it was no longer recognized as a mental disorder.

The DSM-5 has specific listings for eight paraphilic disorders. These are voyeuristic disorder, exhibitionistic disorder, frotteuristic disorder, sexual masochism disorder, sexual sadism disorder, pedophilic disorder, fetishistic disorder, and transvestic disorder. Other paraphilic disorders can be diagnosed under the Other Specified Paraphilic Disorder or Unspecified Paraphilic Disorder listings, if accompanied by distress or impairment.

== Management ==
=== Therapeutic management ===
Most clinicians and researchers believe that paraphilic sexual interests cannot be altered, although evidence is needed to support this. Instead, the goal of therapy is normally to reduce the person's discomfort with their paraphilia and limit the risk of any harmful, anti-social, or criminal behavior. Both psychotherapeutic and pharmacological methods are available to these ends. Cognitive behavioral therapy, at times, can help people with extreme paraphilic disorders develop strategies to avoid acting on their interests. Patients are taught to identify and cope with factors that make acting on their interests more likely, such as stress. It is currently the only form of psychotherapy for paraphilic disorders supported by randomized double-blind trials, as opposed to case studies and consensus of expert opinion.

=== Medications ===
Pharmacological treatments can help people control their sexual behaviors, but do not change the content of the paraphilia. They are typically combined with cognitive behavioral therapy for best effect.

==== SSRIs ====
Selective serotonin reuptake inhibitors (SSRIs) have been well received and are considered an important pharmacological treatment of severe paraphilic disorders. They are proposed to work by reducing sexual arousal, compulsivity, and depressive symptoms. They have been used with exhibitionists, non-offending pedophiles, and compulsive masturbators.

==== Antiandrogens ====
Antiandrogens are used in more extreme cases. Similar to physical castration, they work by reducing androgen levels, and have thus been described as chemical castration. The antiandrogen cyproterone acetate has been shown to substantially reduce sexual fantasies and offending behaviors. Medroxyprogesterone acetate and gonadotropin-releasing hormone agonists (such as leuprorelin) have also been used to lower sex drive. Due to the side effects, the World Federation of Societies of Biological Psychiatry recommends that hormonal treatments only be used when there is a serious risk of sexual violence, or when other methods have failed. Surgical castration has largely been abandoned because these pharmacological alternatives are similarly effective and less invasive.

== Society and culture ==
=== Legality ===
In the United States, since 1990 a significant number of states have passed sexually violent predator laws. Following a series of landmark cases in the Supreme Court of the United States, persons diagnosed with extreme paraphilic disorders, particularly pedophilia (Kansas v. Hendricks, 1997) and others that cause serious difficulty controlling behavior (Kansas v. Crane, 2002), can be held indefinitely in civil confinement under various state legislation generically known as sexually violent predator laws and the federal Adam Walsh Act (United States v. Comstock, 2010).

== See also ==
- Courtship disorder
- Erotic target location error
- Gender identity
- Human sexuality
- Hypersexuality
- Kink (sexuality)
- List of paraphilias
- Lovemap
- Object sexuality
- Perversion
- Psychosexual development
- Sex and the law
- Sexual ethics
- Sexual fetishism
- Richard von Krafft-Ebing
