= Blanchard's transsexualism typology =

Controversial psychological typology

Blanchard's transsexualism typology is a controversial theory proposed by American-Canadian sexologist Ray Blanchard which classifies transgender women into two groups: "homosexual transsexuals" who are attracted exclusively to men and are feminine in both behavior and appearance, and "autogynephilic transsexuals" who experience sexual arousal at the idea of having a female body (autogynephilia). Blanchard proposed the typology in a series of academic papers through the 1980s and 1990s, building on the work of earlier researchers such as Kurt Freund. Blanchard and his supporters argue that the typology explains differences between the two groups in childhood gender nonconformity, sexual orientation, history of sexual fetishism, and age of transition.

Blanchard's typology has attracted significant controversy, especially following the 2003 publication of J. Michael Bailey's book The Man Who Would Be Queen, which presented the typology to a general audience. Among professionals who work with transgender patients, Blanchard's typology and related theories are often considered discredited or unscientific. Scientific criticisms commonly made against Blanchard's research include that Blanchard's typology is unfalsifiable because supporters dismiss or ignore data that challenges the theory, that it failed to properly control against cisgender women rather than against cisgender men in rating levels of autogynephilia, and that when such studies are done they demonstrate most women, cis or trans, experience some level of autogynephilia.

The American Psychiatric Association includes with autogynephilia as a specifier to a diagnosis of transvestic disorder in the fifth edition of the Diagnostic and Statistical Manual of Mental Disorders (2013) and in its 2022 text revision (DSM-5-TR); however, neither edition describes or lists it as a paraphilia. This addition to the DSM-5 was objected to by the World Professional Association for Transgender Health (WPATH), who argued that there was a lack of scientific consensus on and empirical evidence for the concept of autogynephilia. Neither the DSM-5 nor the DSM-5-TR assert that transgender and transsexual women fall under these categories.

== Background ==
Early clinicians described and categorized trans people in a variety of ways. These were at first mainly based on sexual orientation. Later, age of onset of gender-identity disorder was considered as well. People on the transgender-spectrum who were assigned male at birth (AMAB) were put into one of two categories: transsexuals and transvestites. Transsexuals socially and/or physically transitioned, while transvestites sometimes wore clothing associated with women.

An AMAB transsexual (or trans woman) was viewed as a man with a feminized brain, and as such would be assumed to have a feminine gender expression and an attraction to men. This was called the "classical transsexual." AMAB transvestites were assumed to be heterosexual men who wore feminine clothing and experienced sexual arousal from doing so. These labels carried a social stigma of mere sexual fetishism, and contradicted trans women's self-identification as heterosexual or homosexual, respectively. In the 1970s and '80s, this view was brought into question, as some trans women's experiences did not fit into a classical transsexual model.

In 1982, Kurt Freund argued that there were two distinct types of trans women: one type associated with childhood femininity and androphilia (attraction to men), and another associated with fetishism and gynephilia (attraction to women). Freund posited that these two types had different causes, and studied sexual arousal in the latter type. His study focused on fetishistic cross-dressing, but he believed that that was only one expression of fetishism, alongside other feminine-typical behaviors, such as applying makeup or shaving the legs. Blanchard credited Freund with being the first author to distinguish between fantasizing as the opposite sex only when sexually aroused (transvestic fetishism) and erotic arousal due to fantasizing about being female (which he called cross-gender fetishism).

== Theory and definitions ==
The typology proposes a typology of transgender women where they are placed into two distinct classes based on sexual orientation: "homosexual transsexuals" (often abbreviated as HSTS) who are exclusively attracted to men, and "autogynephilic transsexuals" (often abbreviated as AGP) or "nonhomosexual transsexuals" who are not exclusively attracted to men and who experience autogynephilia, or a sexual attraction to the idea of themselves as a woman.

=== Homosexual transsexuals ===
Blanchard uses the term "homosexual" relative to the person's sex assignment at birth, not their current gender identity. In addition to being attracted exclusively to men, the typology asserts that homosexual transsexuals transition younger and report more femininity in childhood.

The use of the word "homosexual" to describe trans women who are attracted to men has been criticized by other researchers. It has been described as archaic, confusing, pejorative, offensive, and heterosexist. Some researchers have suggested using the term androphilia (attraction to men) as a more neutral descriptor for sexual orientation.

=== Autogynephilia ===
Blanchard states that "nonhomosexual" transsexuals exhibit autogynephilia, which he defines as a paraphilic tendency to be aroused by the thought of being a woman.

Autogynephilia (Note: from Greek, autos, "self"; gyne, "woman"; philia, "love") is a term coined by Blanchard for "a male's propensity to be sexually aroused by the thought of himself as a female". The term's meaning was later expanded to refer to "the full gamut of erotically arousing cross-gender behaviors and fantasies". He asserts that this interest is a type of erotic target location error, a term he also coined. Blanchard states that he intended the term to subsume transvestism, including for sexual ideas in which feminine clothing plays only a small or no role at all.

Other terms for such cross-gender fantasies and behaviors include automonosexuality, eonism, and sexo-aesthetic inversion. It is not generally disputed that such cross-gender fantasies and behaviors exist in some transgender women. The disputed aspects of Blanchard's theory are the implications that autogynephilia is the central motivation for non-androphilic transsexuals while being absent in androphilic ones, the characterisation of autogynephilia as a paraphilia, and the refusal to believe the testimony of non-androphilic transsexuals who deny experiencing autogynephilia or androphilic transsexuals who report experiencing it.

==== Relationship to gender dysphoria ====
The current mainstream explanation for a trans person's desire to transition is gender dysphoria, or mental distress due to a mismatch between their internal sense of gender (gender identity) and their external experience of a gendered body, expectations, and behavior. Supporters of the theory such as Lawrence assert that autogynephilia causes a female gender identity to develop, which causes gender dysphoria. However, opponents such as Serano assert that a pre-existing female gender identity causes gender dysphoria, and then in some cases gender dysphoria causes the cross-gender fantasies and behaviors that are described by the typology as autogynephilic.

A 2011 study by Larry Nuttbrock et al. interviewed 571 MtF transsexuals in New York City and found that 73.2% of non-androphilic interviewees reported transvestic fetishism compared to 23.0% of androphilic ones. The former also had a split between gynephilic and bisexual (81.7% and 67.7%). They concluded that the differences were "significant" but implied "strong associations" rather than a rigid division.

==== As a sexual orientation ====
Blanchard and Lawrence have classified autogynephilia as a sexual orientation. Blanchard attributed to Magnus Hirschfeld the notion that some cross-dressing men are sexually aroused by the image of themselves as female. (The concept of a taxonomy based on transsexual sexuality was refined by endocrinologist Harry Benjamin in the Benjamin Scale in 1966, who wrote that researchers of his day thought attraction to men while feeling oneself to be a woman was the factor that distinguished a transsexual from a transvestite (who "is a man [and] feels himself to be one").) Blanchard and Lawrence argue that just like more common sexual orientations such as heterosexuality and homosexuality, it is not only reflected by penile responses to erotic stimuli, but also includes the capacity for pair bond formation and romantic love.

Later studies have found little empirical support for autogynephilia as a sexual identity classification, and sexual orientation is generally understood to be distinct from gender identity. Elke Stefanie Smith and colleagues describe Blanchard's approach as "highly controversial as it could erroneously suggest an erotic background" to transsexualism.

Serano says the idea is generally disproven within the context of gender transition as trans women who are on feminizing hormone therapy, especially on anti-androgens, experience a severe drop and in some cases complete loss in libido. Despite this the vast majority of transgender women continue their transition.

==== Subtypes ====
Blanchard identified four types of autogynephilic sexual fantasy, but stated that co-occurrence of types was common.

- Transvestic autogynephilia: arousal to the act or fantasy of wearing typically feminine clothing
- Behavioral autogynephilia: arousal to the act or fantasy of doing something regarded as feminine
- Physiologic autogynephilia: arousal to fantasies of body functions specific to people regarded as female
- Anatomic autogynephilia: arousal to the fantasy of having a normative woman's body, or parts of one

=== Transgender men ===
Blanchard's typology is mainly concerned with transgender women. Richard Ekins and Dave King state that trans men are absent from the typology, while Blanchard, Cantor, and Katherine Sutton distinguish between gynephilic and androphilic trans men. They state that gynephilic trans men are the counterparts of androphilic trans women, that they experience strong childhood gender nonconformity, and that they generally begin to seek sex reassignment in their mid-twenties. They describe androphilic trans men as a rare but distinct group, and, according to Blanchard, are often specifically attracted to gay men. Cantor and Sutton state that while this may seem analogous to autogynephilia, no distinct paraphilia for this has been identified. However, when other sexologists extended Blanchard's work, they coined the phrase autoandrophilia as the counterpart to autogynephilia in those assigned female at birth.

== Research ==
=== Blanchard's early research ===
Blanchard conducted a series of studies on people with gender dysphoria, analyzing the files of cases seen in the Gender Identity Clinic of the Clarke Institute of Psychiatry and comparing them on multiple characteristics. These studies have been criticized as bad science for being unfalsifiable, as observations inconsistent with the theory are assumed to be the result of a false denial and for failing to sufficiently operationalize their definitions. They have also been criticized for lacking reproducibility, and for a lack of a control group of cisgender women. Supporters of the typology deny these allegations.

Studying patients who had felt like women at all times for at least a year, Blanchard classified them according to whether they were attracted to men, women, both, or neither. He then compared these four groups regarding how many in each group reported a history of sexual arousal together with cross-dressing. Seventy-three percent of the gynephilic, asexual, and bisexual groups said they did experience such feelings, but only 15% of the androphilic group did. He concluded that asexual, bisexual, and gynephilic transsexuals were motivated by erotic arousal to the thought or image of themself as a woman, and he coined the term autogynephilia to describe this.

Blanchard and colleagues conducted a study in 1986 using a penile plethysmography (a measure of blood flow to the penis), demonstrating arousal in response to cross-dressing audio narratives among trans women. Although this study is often cited as evidence for autogynephilia, the authors did not attempt to measure subjects' ideas of themselves as women. The authors concluded that gynephilic gender identity patients who denied experiencing arousal to cross-dressing were still measurably aroused by autogynephilic stimuli, and that autogynephilia among non-androphilic trans women was negatively associated with tendency to color their narrative to be more socially acceptable. However, in addition to having methodological problems, the reported data did not support this conclusion, because the measured arousal to cross-dressing situations was minimal and consistent with subjects' self-reported arousal. This study has been cited by proponents to argue that gynephilic trans women who reported no autogynephilic interests were misrepresenting their erotic interests.

=== Autogynephilia ===
In the first peer-reviewed critique of autogynephilia research, Charles Allen Moser found no substantial difference between "autogynephilic" and "homosexual" transsexuals in terms of gender dysphoria, stating that the clinical significance of autogynephilia was unclear. According to Moser, the idea is not supported by the data, and that despite autogynephilia existing, it is not predictive of the behavior, history, and motivation of trans women. In a re-evaluation of the data used by Blanchard and others as the basis for the typology, he states that autogynephilia is not always present in trans women attracted to women, or absent in trans women attracted to men, and that autogynephilia is not the primary motivation for gynephilic trans women to seek gender-affirming surgery.

In a 2011 study presenting an alternative to Blanchard's explanation, Larry Nuttbrock and colleagues reported that autogynephilia-like characteristics were strongly associated with a specific generational cohort as well as the ethnicity of the subjects; they hypothesized that autogynephilia may become a "fading phenomenon".

==== Cisgender women ====
The concept of autogynephilia has been criticized for implicitly assuming that cisgender women do not experience sexual desire mediated by their own gender identity. Research on autogynephilia in cisgender women shows that cisgender women commonly endorse items on adapted versions of Blanchard's autogynephilia scales, suggesting that the phenomenon might simply be a reflection of erotic self-focus.

Moser created an Autogynephilia Scale for Women in 2009, based on items used to categorize MtF transsexuals as autogynephilic in other studies. A questionnaire that included the ASW was distributed to a sample of 51 professional cisgender women employed at an urban hospital; 29 completed questionnaires were returned for analysis. By the common definition of ever having erotic arousal to the thought or image of oneself as a woman, 93% of the respondents would be classified as autogynephilic. Using a more rigorous definition of "frequent" arousal to multiple items, 28% would be classified as autogynephilic. Lawrence criticized Moser's methodology and conclusions, asserting that Moser's adaption of Blanchard's autogynephilia surveys was not sufficiently similar. Moser responded that Lawrence had made multiple errors by comparing the wrong items.

=== Clinical relevance ===
A body of research finds average group differences between gynephilic and androphilic trans women, which supporters argue supports a typology. However, the clinical relevance of the theory is not clear. Nuttbrock et al. replicated some, but not all previously reported differences and conclude that the inconsistent differences shows that a classification of trans women based on sexuality is "fundamentally limited". Similarly, Veale points out that the observed group differences do not demonstrate that such differences are typological–belonging to two distinct and mutually exclusive types–rather than dimensional. In a 2014 study, she used three different taxometric procedures to assess the structure of correlation data, finding that the observed differences were more reflective of a latent dimensional structure than a typology.

Supporters of the typology claim that the typology provides useful clinical descriptions that predict clinical outcomes. In contrast, Nieder et al. 2016 reviewed the scientific literature on transgender populations and found that "empirically there is no link between sexual orientation and outcome of transition-related health care for trans adults". Sexuality is now considered clinically relevant in transgender care only insofar as it impacts minority stress. Among professionals who work with transgender patients, autogynephilic and associated theories are often considered discredited or unsupported by scientific evidence.

=== Neurological differences ===
The concept that androphilia in trans women is related to homosexuality in cisgender men has been tested by MRI studies. Cantor interprets these studies as supporting Blanchard's transsexualism typology. According to a 2016 review, structural neuroimaging studies seem to support the idea that androphilic and gynephilic trans women have different brain phenotypes, though the authors state that more independent studies of gynephilic trans women are needed to confirm this. A 2021 review examining transgender neurology found that while most brain features can be grouped by birth sex, in some areas trans women's brains resembled cis women's brains and in some areas trans men's brains resembled cis men's brains. It was not possible to consistently identify traits that differentiated trans people from cis people, or gay people from straight people.

== Transfeminist critique ==
Many trans people dispute that their gender identity is related to their sexuality, and have argued that the concept of autogynephilia unduly sexualizes trans women's gender identity. Critics of Blanchard's typology include transfeminists such as Julia Serano and Talia Mae Bettcher. Activist and law professor Florence Ashley writes that the autogynephilia concept has been "discredited", and that Bailey's and Blanchard's work "has long been criticised for perpetuating stereotypes and prejudices against trans women, notably suggesting that LGBQ trans women's primary motivation for transitioning is sexual arousal."

=== Julia Serano ===
The transfeminist biologist Julia Serano describes the typology as flawed, unscientific, and needlessly stigmatizing. According to Serano, "Blanchard's controversial theory is built upon a number of incorrect and unfounded assumptions, and there are many methodological flaws in the data he offers to support it." She argues that flaws in Blanchard's original studies include: being conducted among overlapping populations primarily at the Clarke Institute in Toronto without cisgender controls; subtypes not being empirically derived but instead "begging the question that transsexuals fall into subtypes based on their sexual orientation"; and further research finding a non-deterministic correlation between cross-gender arousal and sexual orientation. She states that Blanchard did not discuss the idea that cross-gender arousal may be an effect, rather than a cause, of gender dysphoria, and that Blanchard assumed that correlation implied causation.

Serano also states that the wider idea of cross-gender arousal was affected by the prominence of sexual objectification of women, accounting for both a relative lack of cross-gender arousal in transsexual men and similar patterns of autogynephilic arousal in non-transsexual women. She criticised proponents of the typology, claiming that they dismiss non-autogynephilic, non-androphilic transsexuals as misreporting or lying while not questioning androphilic transsexuals, describing it as "tantamount to hand-picking which evidence counts and which does not based upon how well it conforms to the model", either making the typology unscientific due to its unfalsifiability, or invalid due to the nondeterministic correlation that later studies found. Serano says that the typology undermined lived experience of transsexual women, contributed to pathologisation and sexualisation of transsexual women, and the literature itself fed into the stereotype of transsexuals as "purposefully deceptive", which could be used to justify discrimination and violence against transsexuals. According to Serano, studies have usually found that some non-androphilic transsexuals report having no autogynephilia.

=== Talia Mae Bettcher ===
Transfeminist philosopher Talia Mae Bettcher, based on her own experience as a trans woman, has critiqued the notion of autogynephilia, and "target errors" generally, within a framework of "erotic structuralism," arguing that the notion conflates essential distinctions between "source of attraction" and "erotic content," and "(erotic) interest" and "(erotic) attraction," thus misinterpreting what she prefers to call, following Serano, "female embodiment eroticism." She maintains that not only is "an erotic interest in oneself as a gendered being," as she puts it, a non-pathological and indeed necessary component of regular sexual attraction to others, but within the framework of erotic structuralism, a "misdirected" attraction to oneself as postulated by Blanchard is outright nonsensical.

== Societal impact ==
=== Inclusion in the Diagnostic and Statistical Manual of Mental Disorders ===
In the third edition of the Diagnostic and Statistical Manual of Mental Disorders (DSM-III) (1980), the diagnosis of "302.5 Transsexualism" was introduced under "Other Psychosexual Disorders". This was an attempt to provide a diagnostic category for gender identity disorders. The diagnostic category, transsexualism, was for individuals with gender dysphoria who demonstrated at least two years of continuous interest in transforming their physical and social gender status. The subtypes were asexual, homosexual (same anatomic sex), heterosexual (other anatomic sex) and unspecified. This was removed in the DSM-IV, in which gender identity disorder replaced transsexualism. Previous taxonomies, or systems of categorization, used the terms classic transsexual or true transsexual, terms once used in differential diagnoses.

The DSM-IV-TR included autogynephilia as an "associated feature" of gender identity disorder and as a common occurrence in the transvestic fetishism disorder, but does not classify autogynephilia as a disorder by itself or list it as a paraphilia.

The paraphilias working group on the DSM-5, chaired by Ray Blanchard, included both with autogynephilia and with autoandrophilia as specifiers to transvestic disorder in an October 2010 draft of the DSM-5. This addition has been criticized as a conflict of interest. This proposal was opposed by the World Professional Association for Transgender Health (WPATH), citing a lack of empirical evidence for these specific subtypes. WPATH argued that there was no scientific consensus on the concept, and that there was a lack of longitudinal studies on the development of transvestic fetishism. With autoandrophilia was removed from the final draft of the manual. Blanchard later said he had initially included it to avoid criticism: "I proposed it simply in order not to be accused of sexism [...] I don't think the phenomenon even exists." When published in 2013, the DSM-5 included With autogynephilia (sexual arousal by thoughts, images of self as a female) as a specifier to 302.3 Transvestic disorder (intense sexual arousal from cross-dressing fantasies, urges or behaviors); the other specifier is With fetishism (sexual arousal to fabrics, materials or garments).

=== Popularization ===
Blanchard's research and conclusions came to wider attention with the publication of popular science books on transsexualism, including The Man Who Would Be Queen (2003) by sexologist J. Michael Bailey and Men Trapped in Men's Bodies (2013) by sexologist Anne Lawrence, both of which based their portrayals of male-to-female transsexuals on Blanchard's taxonomy. The concept of autogynephilia in particular received little public interest until Bailey's 2003 book, though Blanchard and others had been publishing studies on the topic for nearly 20 years. Bailey's book was followed by peer-reviewed articles critiquing the methodology used by Blanchard. Both Bailey and Blanchard have since attracted intense criticism by clinicians and transgender activists.

=== Litigation ===
In the 2010 U.S. Tax Court case O'Donnabhain v. Commissioner, the Internal Revenue Service cited Blanchard's typology as justification for denying a trans woman's tax deductions for medical costs relating to treatment of her gender identity disorder, claiming the procedures were not medically necessary. The court found in favor of the plaintiff, Rhiannon O'Donnabhain, ruling that she should be allowed to deduct the costs of her treatment, including sex reassignment surgery and hormone therapy. In its decision, the court declared the IRS's position "at best a superficial characterization of the circumstances" that was "thoroughly rebutted by the medical evidence".

=== Anti-LGBT groups ===
According to the Southern Poverty Law Center (SPLC), autogynephilia has been promoted by anti-LGBT hate groups. These include the Family Research Council (FRC), United Families International (UFI), and the American College of Pediatricians (ACPeds). Both Blanchard and Bailey have written articles for 4thWaveNow, which the SPLC describes as an anti-trans website.

Nic Rider and Elliot Tebbe characterize Blanchard's theory of autogynephilia as an anti-trans theory that functions to invalidate and delegitimize transgender individuals.

==== Gender-critical feminists ====
Serano writes that trans-exclusionary feminists have embraced the idea of autogynephilia beginning in the 2000s. One early proponent of autogynephilia was radical feminist Sheila Jeffreys. The concept has been used to imply that trans women are sexually deviant men. The concept of autogynephilia became popular on gender-critical websites such as 4thWaveNow, Mumsnet, and the Reddit community /r/GenderCritical.

=== Use in transgender communities ===
Blanchard's typology has been adopted by certain transgender communities such as 4chan's /lgbt/ board in ironic and sometimes sincere ways. The use of the typology has spurred the creation of jargon, a cultural meaning of autogynephile (AGP) as a transgender woman who does not pass and a belief in homosexual transexuals (HSTS) being "real" transgender women.

== See also ==
- Classification of transgender people
- Autoeroticism
- Partialism
- Transgender sexuality
- List of transgender-related topics
