= List of paraphilias =

List of sexual interests considered atypical

Paraphilia
- Specialty: Psychiatry
- Symptoms: Sexual attraction to the atypical

Paraphilias are sexual interests in objects, situations, or individuals that are atypical. The American Psychiatric Association, in its Diagnostic and Statistical Manual, Fifth Edition (DSM), draws a distinction between paraphilias (which it describes as atypical sexual interests) and paraphilic disorders (which additionally require the experience of distress, impairment in functioning or the desire to act on them with a nonconsenting person). Some paraphilias have more than one term to describe them, and some terms overlap with others. Paraphilias without DSM codes listed come under DSM 302.9, "Paraphilia NOS (Not Otherwise Specified)".

In his 2008 book on sexual pathologies, Anil Aggrawal compiled a list of 547 terms describing paraphilic sexual interests. He cautioned, however, that "not all these paraphilias have necessarily been seen in clinical setups. This may not be because they do not exist, but because they are so innocuous they are never brought to the notice of clinicians or dismissed by them. Like allergies, sexual arousal may occur from anything under the sun, including the sun."

Most of the following names for paraphilias, constructed in the nineteenth and especially twentieth centuries from Greek and Latin roots (see List of medical roots, suffixes and prefixes), are used in medical contexts only.

== Paraphilias ==
=== A ===
Paraphilia	Focus of erotic interest
Abasiophilia	People with impaired mobility.
Acomoclitism	A lack of pubic hair.
Acrotomophilia	People with amputations.
Agalmatophilia	Statues, mannequins and immobility.
Algolagnia	Pain, particularly involving an erogenous zone; differs from masochism as there is a biologically different interpretation of the intense sensation rather than a subjective interpretation.
Amaurophilia	Being unable to see, i.e. blindness or the presence of a blindfold.
Amokoscisia	Slashing and mutilating women.
Andromimetophilia	Transgender men.
Anililagnia	Attraction to older women.
Antholagnia	Flowers.
Anthropophagolagnia	Raping and then cannibalizing another person.
Apotemnophilia	Being an amputee.
Aquaphilia	People swimming, posing, or drowning in water.
Armpit fetishism or maschalagnia	Armpits.
Asphyxiophilia	Asphyxia or strangling of oneself or others.
Attraction to disability	People with one or more physical disabilities.
Autagonistophilia	Being on stage or on camera.
Autassassinophilia	Being in life-threatening situations.
Autoerotic asphyxiation	Self-induced asphyxiation, sometimes to the point of near unconsciousness.
Autofellatio	Performing oral sex on oneself (male).
Autohemofetishism	Making oneself bleed, a type of hematolagnia.
Autonepiophilia	The image of oneself in the form of an infant.
Autopedophilia	The image of oneself in the form of a child.
Autoplushophilia	The image of oneself in the form of a plush.
Autovampirism/vampirism	The image of oneself in the form of a vampire. Involves ingesting or seeing one's own blood.
Autozoophilia	The image of oneself in the form of an animal.

=== B ===
Paraphilia	Focus of erotic interest
Belly fetishism or alvinolagnia	The midriff or belly.
Biastophilia or raptophilia	Raping a person, possibly as a consensual rape fantasy.
Body inflation fetishism	Fantasizing about the inflation of body parts.
Body modification fetishism	Tattoos, piercings, scarification, and other body alterations.
Bondage	Being tied up or physically restrained.
Breast fetishism or mazophilia	Female breasts.

=== C ===
Paraphilia	Focus of erotic interest
Cacophilia	Loud or unpleasant sounds.
Candaulism	Exposing one's partner or images of their partner to others.
Cannibalism or anthropophagy	Ingesting human flesh.
Canophilia	Dogs.
Capnolagnia	Smoking.
Cheirophilia	Hands or hand contact.
Chremastistophilia	Being robbed or held up.
Chronophilia	Partners of a widely differing chronological age.
Claustrophilia	Confined or enclosed spaces.
Climacophilia	Falling down stairs.
Clothing fetishism	Specific garments such as lingerie, uniforms, or latex wear.
Coprophilia (also fecophilia, scatophilia)	Feces.
Coulrophilia	Clowns.
Crush fetishism	Crushing objects or small animals.
Cuckolding fetishism or troilism	Observing one's partner engaged in sexual activities with another person.

=== D ===
Paraphilia	Focus of erotic interest
Dacryphilia	Tears or crying.
Dendrophilia	Trees.
Diaper fetishism	Diapers; considerable overlap with paraphilic infantilism.

=== E ===
Paraphilia	Focus of erotic interest
Electrophilia	Electricity or electric stimulation, including shocks.
Emetolagnia	Watching others vomit (distinct from emetophilia).
Emetophilia	Vomit.
Entomophilia	Insects.
Eproctophilia	Flatulence.
Erotic humiliation	Being humiliated or humiliating others.
Erotic lactation	Lactation and breastfeeding.
Erotophonophilia or dacnolagnomania	Murder, often of strangers.
Exhibitionism or peiodeiktophilia	Exposing one's genitals to unsuspecting and nonconsenting others.
Exophilia	Extraterrestrials.

=== F ===
Paraphilia	Focus of erotic interest
Fat fetishism or adipophilia	Overweight or obese people.
Feederism	Eating, feeding, and weight gain.
Food play or sitophilia	Erotic situations involving food.
Foot fetishism or podophilia	Feet.
Formicophilia	Being crawled on by insects.
Forniphilia	Turning a human being into a piece of furniture.
Free use	Being "used" sexually by a sexual partner whenever they are aroused.
Frotteurism	Rubbing against a non-consenting person.

=== G ===
Paraphilia	Focus of erotic interest
Gerontophilia	Elderly people.
Globophilia	Balloons, including inflating, popping, or rubbing them.
Gynandromorphophilia or gynemimetophilia	Transgender women.
Gynephilia	Females or femininity, regardless of one's own sex or gender identity.

=== H ===
Paraphilia	Focus of erotic interest
Hair fetishism or trichophilia	Hair.
Hand fetishism or cheirophilia	Hands.
Hematolagnia	Drinking or looking at blood.
Heterophilia	Idealization of heterosexuality or people who are "straight-acting", especially by non-heterosexual people.
Hierophilia	Religious/sacred objects.
Hoplophilia	Firearms, guns.
Hybristophilia	Criminals, particularly those who committed cruel or outrageous crimes.

=== I ===
Paraphilia	Focus of erotic interest
Impregnation fetishism	The event of being impregnated or impregnating another person.
Infantophilia	Children less than five years old; a recently suggested term that is not in general use.

=== K ===
Paraphilia	Focus of erotic interest
Katoptronophilia	Mirrors.
Kleptolagnia or kleptophilia	Stealing; a form of kleptomania.
Klismaphilia	Enemas, arousal and enjoyment in receiving, administering, or both.

=== L ===
Paraphilia	Focus of erotic interest
Lactophilia or galactophilia	Breast milk, breastfeeding or sucking on a woman's breasts.
Leg fetishism or crurophilia	Legs.
Lesbophilia	Attraction to lesbians.

=== M ===
Paraphilia	Focus of erotic interest
Macrophilia	Giant beings; imagined growth of beings.
Masochism	Suffering or humiliation; being beaten, bound, or otherwise abused.
Mechanophilia	Cars or other machines; also "mechaphilia".
Melolagnia	Music.
Menophilia	Menstruation.
Metrophilia	Poetry.
Microphilia	Shrunken beings; imagined shrinking of beings.
Morphophilia	Particular body shapes or sizes.
Mucophilia	Mucus.
Mysophilia	Dirtiness, soiled or decaying things.

=== N ===
Paraphilia	Focus of erotic interest
Narratophilia	Obscene words.
Navel fetishism or alvinophilia	Navels.
Necrophilia	Corpses.
Nose fetishism or nasophilia	Noses.

=== O ===
Paraphilia	Focus of erotic interest
Objectophilia	Specific inanimate objects.
Oculolinctus	The act of licking the eyes of another person for the purpose of gratification.
Odaxelagnia	Biting or being bitten.
Olfactophilia or bromidrophilia	Smells and odors (particularly foul ones) emanating from the body, especially the sexual areas or from the opposite sex (as from bad breath, urine, feces, flatulence, etc.).
Omorashi	Having a full bladder or wetting oneself, or from seeing someone else experiencing a full bladder or wetting themself.

=== P ===
Paraphilia	Focus of erotic interest
Paraphilic infantilism (also autonepiophilia, adult baby syndrome)	Dressing or being treated like a baby; considerable overlap with diaper fetishism.
Partialism	Specific, non-genital body parts.
Pedophilia	Preadolescent children; also spelled paedophilia.
Pedovestism	Dressing like a child.
Pictophilia	Pornography or erotic art, particularly pictures.
Piquerism	Piercing the flesh of another person, most commonly by stabbing or cutting the body with sharp objects.
Plushophilia	Stuffed toys ("plushies").
Pregnancy fetishism or maiesiophilia	Pregnant women.
Pygophilia	Buttocks.
Pyrophilia	Fire.

=== R ===
Paraphilia	Focus of erotic interest
Robot fetishism or robophilia	Humanoid robots.

=== S ===
Paraphilia	Focus of erotic interest
Sadism	Inflicting pain on others.
Salirophilia	Soiling or dirtying others.
Sexual fetishism	Nonliving objects.
Shoe fetishism	Shoes, especially high heels.
Somnophilia or dormaphilia	Being asleep or unconscious, or pretending to be asleep or unconscious.
Sophophilia	Learning.
Sthenolagnia	Muscles and displays of strength.
Stigmatophilia	Body piercings and tattoos.
Symphorophilia	Witnessing or staging disasters such as car accidents.

=== T ===
Paraphilia	Focus of erotic interest
Telephone Scatologia (also scatophilia, telephonicophilia)	Obscene phone calls, particularly to strangers.
Tentacle erotica	Tentacles and tentacle creatures
Teratophilia	Deformed or monstrous people. The term is also sometimes used in a more literal sense (from ancient Greek τέρας, teras, meaning monster) for attraction to monstrous mythical and fictional creatures such as werewolves.
Tickling fetishism or knismolagnia	Tickling.
Timophilia	Gold, wealth, or social status.
Toucherism	Touching an unsuspecting, non-consenting person with the hand.
Toxophilia	Archery.
Transvestic fetishism	Cross-dressing.

=== U ===
Paraphilia	Focus of erotic interest
Urolagnia or water sports	Urination, particularly in public, on others or being urinated on.

=== V ===
Paraphilia	Focus of erotic interest
Vorarephilia or vore	The idea of one person or creature eating or being eaten by another; usually swallowed whole, in one piece.
Voyeurism or scopophilia	Watching unsuspecting people while naked/undressing, engaging in sexual intercourse or other sexual activity, using the toilet, showering/bathing, or inadvertently flashing.

=== W ===
Paraphilia	Focus of erotic interest
Wet and messy fetishism	Messy situations, including, but not limited to, being pied, slimed, or covered in mud.
Wetlook	The wearing of wet clothing.

=== X ===
Paraphilia	Focus of erotic interest
Xenophilia	Foreign peoples, cultures, or customs.

=== Z ===
Paraphilia	Focus of erotic interest
Zoophilia	Non-human animals.
Zoosadism	Inflicting pain on animals, or seeing animals in pain.

== See also ==
- Courtship disorders
- Erotic target location errors
- List of phobias
- Lovemaps
- Perversion
- Sexual fetishism
