= Autagonistophilia =

Paraphilia involving being observed

Autagonistophilia is a paraphilia based on being observed.

Robert J. Campbell, in his Psychiatric Dictionary describes it as, "a paraphilia in which sexual arousal and orgasm are contingent upon displaying one's self in a live show, i.e., being observed performing on stage or on camera." In his 1999 book, The Clinical Lacan, Joel Dor, writing on hysteria, says, "through this identification with the ideal object of the people's desire, all her efforts are in the service of phallic identification. It is not surprising, therefore, to note the hysteric's intense attraction toward any situation in which this imaginary identification can be brought onstage."

== See also ==
- List of paraphilias
- Exhibitionism
