= Haematophilia =

Haematophilia or hematophilia may refer to:

- Haemophilia, a mostly inherited genetic disorder that impairs the body's ability to make blood clots
- Haematolagnia, sexual attraction to blood
