= Men Trapped in Men's Bodies: Narratives of Autogynephilic Transsexualism =

2013 book by Anne Lawrence

- Author: Anne Lawrence
- Language: English
- Series: Focus on Sexuality Research
- Subject: Autogynephilia, transgenderism
- Published: New York
- Publisher: Springer Publishing
- Publication date: 2013
- Publication place: United States
- Media type: Print
- Pages: 242
- ISBN: 9781461451815
- OCLC: 802321578
- Website: https://annelawrence.com/book/

Men Trapped in Men's Bodies: Narratives of Autogynephilic Transsexualism is a 2013 book about Blanchard's transsexualism typology written by sexologist Anne Lawrence. The book was published in 2013 by Springer in New York.

The book includes 249 first-person narratives of autogynephilia by transgender women and 52 narratives of autogynephilia by cisgender men (301 narratives in total) that were submitted to and collected by Lawrence. This followed earlier collections of the same kinds of narratives that Lawrence had published in 1999. Besides the book, Lawrence has published a number of literature reviews on autogynephilia.

== Title ==
The book's title is similar to the title of a chapter called Men Trapped in Men's Bodies in J. Michael Bailey's 2003 book, The Man Who Would Be Queen: The Science of Gender-Bending and Transsexualism, with this chapter title being inspired by and taking after the titles of Lawrence's earlier essays. The phrase "men trapped in men's bodies" refers to the fact that transgender women are often described as "women trapped in men's bodies", yet autogynephilic transgender women are claimed by Blanchard's typology to be behaviorally more similar to men and to have an intense desire to become women due to their autogynephilic feelings. Hence, these transgender women, relative to pretransition, could alternatively be described as "men trapped in men's bodies" per Lawrence. Ray Blanchard has stated that Lawrence initially startled even him with the phrase and the forthright titles of her essays.

== Reception ==
Men Trapped in Men's Bodies: Narratives of Autogynephilic Transsexualism has received several published book reviews, including by psychologist Richard Lippa, psychiatrist Stephen B. Levine, sexologist Kevin Hsu, psychologist Richard Carroll, and psychologist Margaret Nichols. It has been regarded by Ray Blanchard, who wrote the foreword of the book and developed the concept of autogynephilia, as the definitive text on the subject of autogynephilia. He has compared it favorably to Magnus Hirschfeld's classic 1910 work, Die Transvestiten: Eine Untersuchung über den Erotischen Verkleidungstrieb (Transvestites: The Erotic Drive to Cross-Dress).

Many transgender women reject autogynephilia as an explanation for their feelings and consider the concept to be offensive. Criticisms have been lobbied against the construct of autogynephilia on a variety of grounds. However, some people, most famously Lawrence herself, identify with autogynephilia and find that it accurately describes their experiences. That some individuals identify with autogynephilia is also evidenced by the 301 narratives of autogynephilia by transgender and non-transgender people that were submitted to and published by Lawrence.
