= Plushophilia =

Stuffed toy fetishism

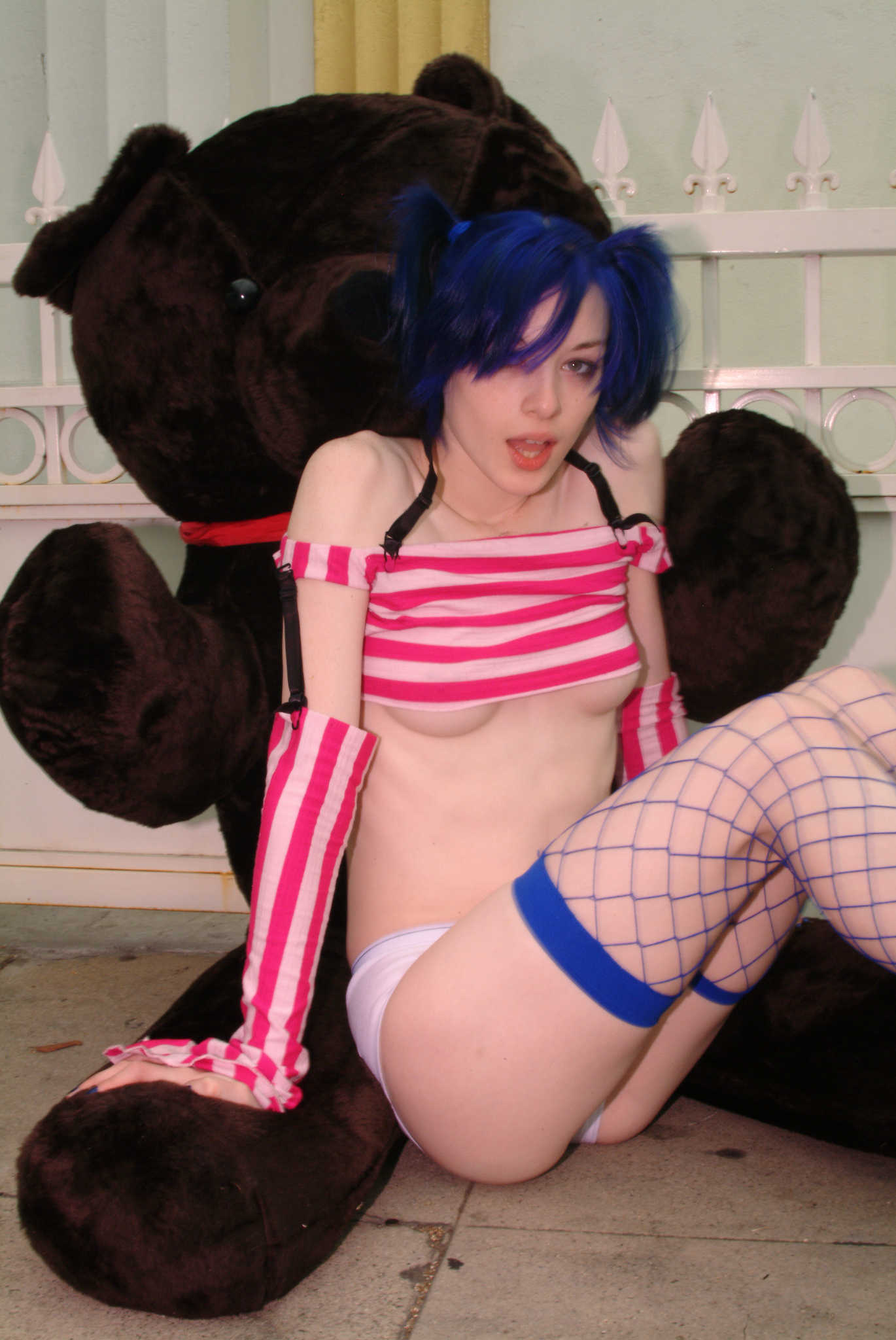
Plushophiles can view stuffed toys in a sexual way

Plushophilia (Note: From plushie + -o- + -philia.) is the sexual or romantic attraction to stuffed toys (plushies). A paraphilia, it is simultaneously a form of object sexuality—the attraction to inanimate objects. A person with such an interest in stuffed animals is a plushophile. Plushophiles sometimes modify their plushies to have holes in them to simulate a vagina or anus.

== Overview ==
Plushophilia is the sexual or romantic attraction to stuffed toys, also known as plushies, plush toys or soft toys. A paraphilia, it is a form of object sexuality (objectophilia)—the attraction to inanimate objects. A person who identifies as having plushophilia is known as a plushophile. The plushies to which plushophiles are attracted can be representations (merchandise) of fictional characters, mascots or animals, thus possibly combing fictosexuality and zoophilia with plushophilia. Consequently, the sexual interest one such person holds in a plush toy might be directed at the character the plushie depicts rather than being aroused by the stuffed toy itself.

=== Sexual activity ===
Plushophiles sometimes modify their plushies to have holes in them to simulate a vagina or anus; these are called SPAs (strategically-placed appendages) or SPHs (strategically-placed holes). In this way, the plush toy, their object of sexual desire, becomes a sex toy.

== Characterisation and related fetishes ==
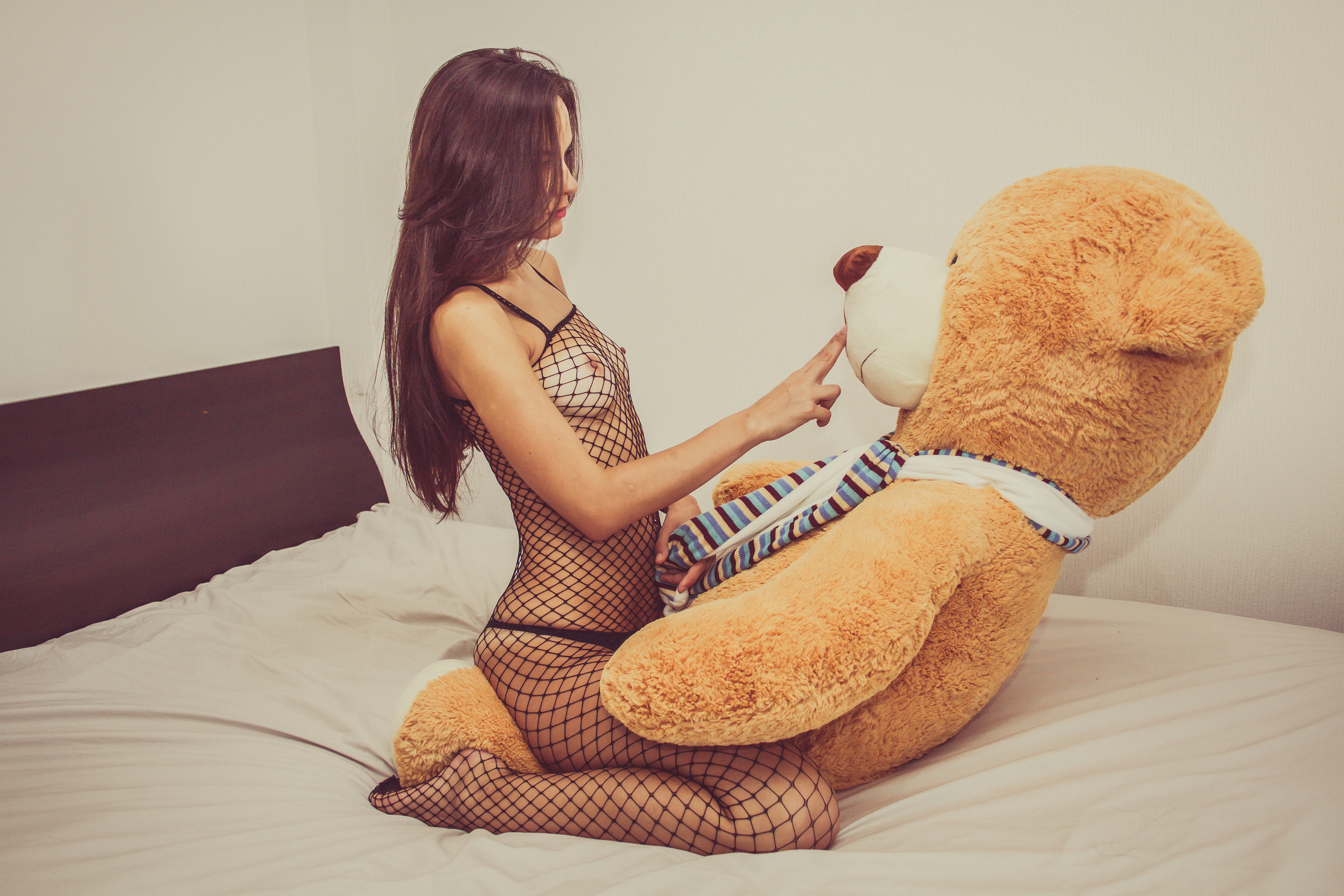
Clothed in a fishnet bodystocking kneeling on a bed with a huge stuffed teddy bear in a sexually suggestive way.

Plushophilia is a noncoercive paraphilia; it can be practiced by one's self, as it directly involves a non-living object. Some researchers have drawn comparisons between plushophilia and being attracted to fursuits, animal mascots or anthropomorphic animals such as furries. Plushophilia is notably found within AB/DL pornography, and academics Sunil M. Doshi, Kalpesh Zanzrukiya and Lavlesh Kumar said that plushophilia was another "childhood related [fantasy]" alongside diapers. Anthony Ferguson draws a "slight connection" between plushophilia and necrophilia in that, in the case of both paraphilias, the source of one's sexual desire cannot move autonomously during sexual engagement—it is a "non-resisting other".

Ursusagalmatophilia (Note: From Latin ursus “bear” + agalmatophilia.) is the paraphilia for teddy bears specifically. Autoplushophilia is the paraphilia for imaging oneself as a plushie.

=== Association with the furry fandom ===
A fursuiter with a Worm on a String suit attends a plushie fan meetup.

Plushophilia has erroneously been described as a common occurrence within the furry fandom. The source for this has been attributed to George Gurley's 2001 article about the hobby for Vanity Fair that was criticised by furries for incorrectly portraying the furry fandom as inherently sexual. Jessica Ruth Austin criticised the writings on plushophilia by psychologist and sexologist Anne Lawrence as "problematic" because the way it is written perhaps suggests that "Lawrence is unconvinced that not all fursuiters have plushophilia." Lawrence's principal source for fursuiting activities came from the 2001 article by Gurley.

== See also ==
- Animal roleplay § Erotic scenarios
- Fur fetishism – Sexual fetish relating to particular type of clothing
- Yiff – Pornography of anthropomorphic animal characters
