= Toby Meltzer =

American surgeon

Toby R. Meltzer
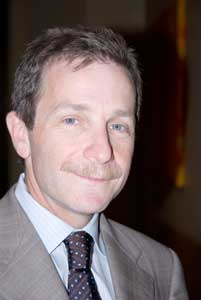
- Born: September 19, 1957 (age 68)
- Education: University of Michigan
- Occupation: Surgeon
- Website: Official Site

Toby R. Meltzer (born September 19, 1957) is an American plastic and reconstructive surgeon. Meltzer specializes in sex reassignment surgery male-to-female, sex reassignment surgery female-to-male, and facial feminization surgery. In the 1990s, Meltzer pioneered the neovaginal construction technique that increased the ability of the neoclitoris to feel sensations. According to his website, Meltzer performs 2-4 vaginoplasties a week, and that he has performed over 3000 male and female sexual reassignment (SRS) surgeries. Joan Roughgarden called Meltzer one of the leading surgeons in this specialized field. He practices in Scottsdale, Arizona.

== Education and early practice ==
Meltzer is a graduate of the Louisiana State University school of medicine, where he completed a residency in general surgery. He completed his plastic surgery residency at the University of Michigan. Meltzer then began his practice, while working as a clinical professor of plastic surgery at Oregon Health Sciences University (OHSU). There he specialized in general surgery, plastic surgery, and completed a fellowship in surgery for treatment of severe burn injuries.

Working with the chief of Plastic and Reconstructive Surgery Division at OHSU, he began training in SRS surgical techniques. Meltzer researched and interviewed pediatric urologists with experience treating children born with ambiguous genitalia, and surgeons already performing vaginoplasty surgeries such as the late Stanley Biber. In 1993 he began performing vaginoplasty surgeries, which eventually became a large part of his practice. In 1996, he opened his own private practice in Portland, Oregon. In 2003, he relocated his practice to Scottsdale, Arizona, in 2003 becoming the first doctor in that state to specialize in gender reconstruction surgery.

Meltzer was forced to relocate to Scottsdale after a conservative physicians consortium, Symphony Healthcare, purchased Eastmoreland Hospital. Meltzer was reportedly forced out due to Symphony's hefty price increase, that some claim was a ruse due to the conservative corporation's objections to sexual reassignment surgery. According to reports, Meltzer's surgeries accounted for 50 percent of the hospital's revenue. Symphony Healthcare filed for Chapter 11 bankruptcy protection less than two years later.

== Surgical practice ==
During the 1990s, during his practice in Portland Meltzer developed a vaginoplasty technique. Meltzer's demeanor and surgical skills gained him respect in the transgender community as he was considered having surpassed the veteran Stanley Biber in terms of referrals. He is also one of just a few surgeons in the U.S. who performs metiodioplasty procedures to create male genitalia for FTM trans men.

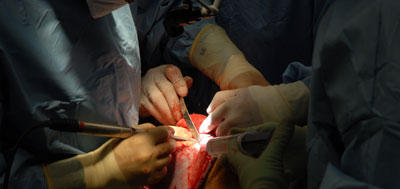
Meltzer performing forehead reduction with an electric burr

In the late 1990s, Meltzer performed many cricothyroid approximation surgeries. This procedure attempts to raise vocal pitch by surgically modifying the cricoid and thyroid cartilage structures. The intent of the procedure is to raise the vocal pitch of patients unable to do so through voice training. Improved voice training methods (which often produce better results than the surgery) and the inherent risks of vocal surgery have largely eliminated the demand for cricothyroid approximation.

According to his website, Meltzer performs facial feminization surgery (FFS), and is available to provide: mandibular angle osteotomy, genioplasty, cranioplasty, scalp advancement, trachea reduction, and other feminizing procedures. Also aspects of his practice are: reconstruction of severed limbs, scar revision surgeries, and more familiar plastic surgical procedures such as breast augmentation.
