= Argosy University, Seattle =

Coordinates: 47°36′53″N 122°21′11″W

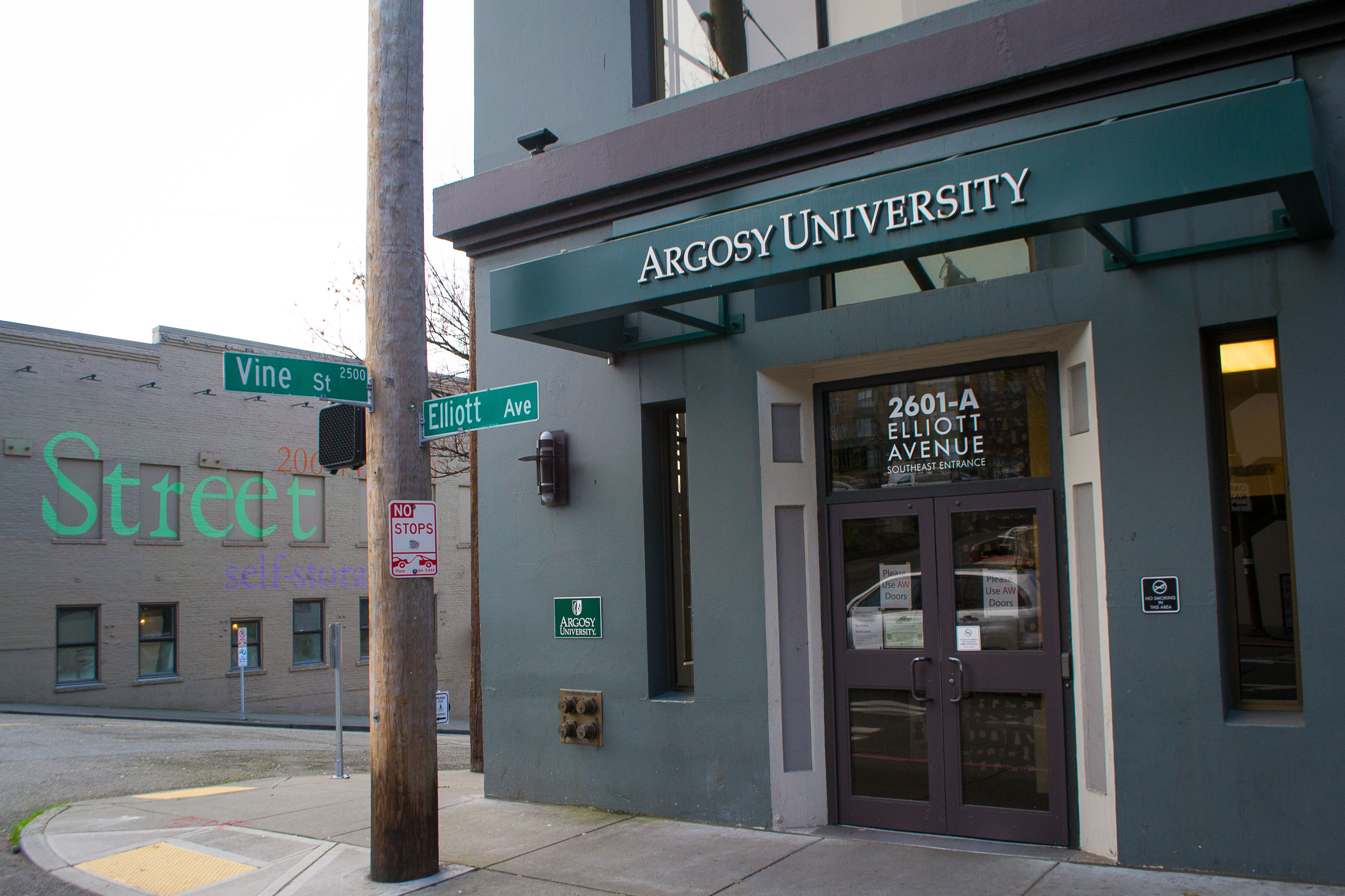
Argosy University, Seattle

Argosy University, Seattle was one of 19 campuses nationwide of the for-profit Argosy University, which was formed in 2001 through the merger of the American Schools of Professional Psychology, the Medical Institute of Minnesota, and the University of Sarasota. The Seattle campus was founded in 1995 as the Washington School of Professional Psychology and closed in 2016. It no longer accepts any new students.

The campus was located in an office building on the Seattle waterfront, on the edge of the Belltown neighborhood.
