= Ray Blanchard =

American-Canadian sexologist (born 1945)

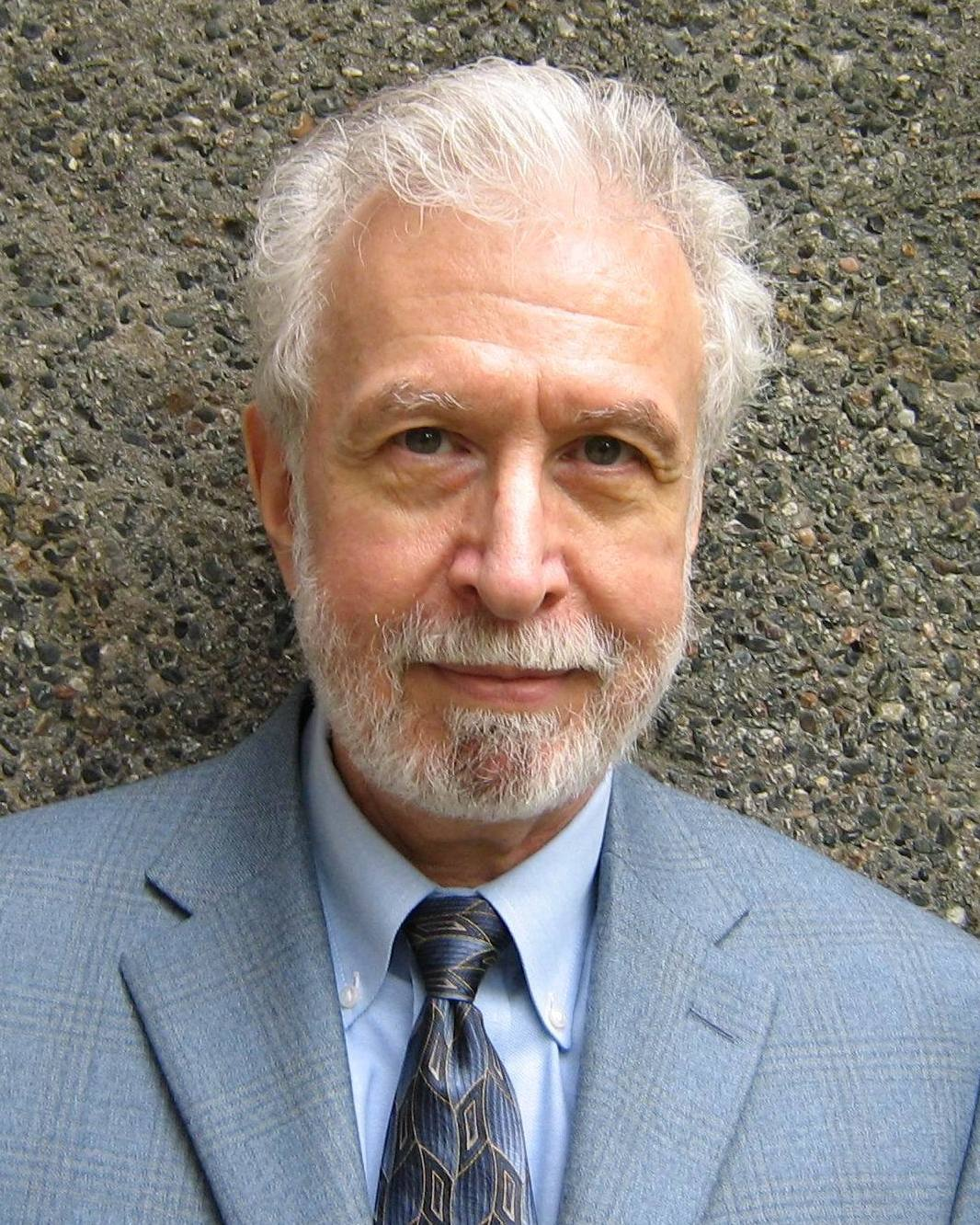
- Blanchard in 2008
- Born: Ray Milton Blanchard III; October 9, 1945 (age 81); Hammonton, New Jersey, U.S.
- Citizenship: United States; Canada
- Education: University of Pennsylvania (BA); University of Illinois, Urbana-Champaign (MA, PhD)
- Known for: Blanchard's transsexualism typology; Fraternal birth order effect; Handedness and sexual orientation; Erotic target location error
- Scientific career
- Fields: Psychology; Sexology
- Workplaces: University of Toronto; Centre for Addiction and Mental Health

Ray Milton Blanchard III (/ˈblæntʃərd/ BLAN-chərd; born October 9, 1945) is an American-Canadian sexologist who researches pedophilia, sexual orientation and gender identity. He has found that men with more older brothers are more likely to be gay than men with fewer older brothers, a phenomenon he attributes to the reaction of the mother's immune system to male fetuses. Blanchard has also published research studies on phallometry and several paraphilias, including autoerotic asphyxia. Blanchard also proposed a typology of transsexualism. His proposed theories have met mixed reception.

== Education and career ==
Blanchard was born in Hammonton, New Jersey to parents Angelina (née Celi) and Ray Milton Blanchard Jr. His father, who served as an Aviation Metalsmith in the United States Navy, went missing in action during World War II. He is memorialized at the National Memorial Cemetery of the Pacific in Honolulu.

He received his A.B. in Psychology from the University of Pennsylvania in 1967 and his Ph.D. from the University of Illinois in 1973. He conducted postdoctoral research at Dalhousie University until 1976, when he accepted a position as a clinical psychologist at the Ontario Correctional Institute in Brampton, Ontario, Canada (a suburb of Toronto). There, Blanchard met Kurt Freund, who became his mentor. Freund was conducting research in chemical castration for sex offenders. In 1980, he joined the Clarke Institute of Psychiatry (now part of the Centre for Addiction and Mental Health). In 1995 Blanchard was named Head of Clinical Sexology Services in the Law and Mental Health Programme of the CAMH, where he served until 2010. He is an adjunct Professor of Psychiatry at the University of Toronto. He served on the American Psychiatric Association DSM-IV Subcommittee on Gender Identity Disorders and was named to the DSM-5 committee.

Blanchard was a member of the World Professional Association for Transgender Health (WPATH), then called the Harry Benjamin International Gender Dysphoria Association (HBIGDA). However, after criticism of the book, The Man Who Would Be Queen, which relied heavily on Blanchard's typology, Blanchard left HBIGDA on November 4, 2003.

In December 2003, the Southern Poverty Law Center reported that Ray Blanchard and J. Michael Bailey were associated with Steve Sailer's Human Biodiversity Institute, a group of far-right writers, academics, and others associated with pseudoscientific race theories and eugenics.

According to Google Scholar, Blanchard's works have been cited more than 14,000 times and he has an h-index of 65.

== Work ==
=== Fraternal birth order effect ===
Blanchard has conducted research on factors that influence the development of sexual orientation, including biological factors. He has proposed a theory known as a fraternal birth order effect or older brother effect. This theory is that the more older brothers a man has, the greater the probability is that he will have a homosexual sexual orientation. The number of older sisters has no effect, however. The same is not true for lesbians—neither the number of older brothers nor the number of older sisters appears to be related to the sexual orientation of women. The fraternal birth order effect has been described by one of its proponents as "the most consistent biodemographic correlate of sexual orientation in men", with each older brother increasing a man's odds of being gay by about 33%.

Blanchard hypothesizes that the older brother effect is caused by interactions between a male fetus and the immune system of the mother: because certain proteins (called H-y antigens) are produced by male and not by female fetuses, the mother's immune system reacts only to male fetuses and is more likely to produce a reaction with each successive exposure to a male fetus.

=== Typology of transsexualism ===
Blanchard coined the term "autogynephilia" to describe trans women with an erotic desire "to be women," and hypothesized that all gender dysphoria experienced by this group is of two types: "homosexual" gender dysphoria and "non-homosexual" gender dysphoria. Blanchard defined the former as being present in transsexuals attracted to men, while he defined the latter as being present in transsexuals attracted to the idea of themselves as women. Within the transgender community, the idea has been criticized. Blanchard's findings and research have been rejected by the World Professional Association for Transgender Health (WPATH), the largest association of medical professionals who provide care for transgender people, as lacking empirical evidence.

Blanchard supports public funding of sex reassignment surgery as an appropriate treatment for transsexual people, as he believes the available evidence supports that the surgery helps them live more comfortably and happily, with high satisfaction rates.

Blanchard defined autogynephilic as "a man's paraphilic tendency to be sexually aroused by the thought or image of himself as a woman". He researched this theory by conducting a test on a sample of 119 MtF transsexuals who submitted an anonymous questionnaire to test if they were autogynephilic or homosexual. Blanchard believed that not all transsexuals fit in the category of "homosexual" and that some were instead autogynephilic transsexuals. Survey participants felt that they were neither homosexual nor autogynephilic transsexuals and should not be classified in either group. A majority felt that the sexual attraction to become a woman weakened with age, but others reported that they had noticed a change after physical transition. Blanchard ultimately concluded that transsexuals were either sexually aroused by men, androphilic, or aroused by the thought of being a woman, nonandrophilic.

The number of openly transgender women has rapidly increased over the past several decades. More and more individuals have undergone operations and hormone therapy. They believe that their gender identity, defined as "one's inner sense of being male or female, masculine or feminine", did not match the body they were in. According to Blanchard, "Autogynephilic transsexuals were men who were also sexually attracted to women, but whose paraphilic sexual interest made them want to go farther and permanently change their bodies to become the objects of their attraction".

According to Julia Serano, Blanchard's autogynephilia theory is commonly used by trans-exclusionary radical feminists, or "gender critical" feminists, to imply that trans women are sexually deviant men. According to the Southern Poverty Law Center, Blanchard's autogynephilia theory has been promoted by anti-LGBT hate groups.

=== Teleiophilia ===
Teleiophilia, which denotes sexual interest in adults, is not categorized as a paraphilia, in contrast to concepts like pedophilia, which involves sexual interest in prepubescent children. The term was formalized in order to forestall neologisms, such as "adultophilia" or "normophilia", that were occasionally used but had no precise definition. The term is used primarily by professional sexologists in the scientific literature.

=== DSM-5 appointment ===
Blanchard served on the gender dysphoria sub-working group for the DSM-IV.

Blanchard served as chair of the paraphilia sub-working group for the DSM-5. Transgender activists protested the appointment for the DSM-5. The National LGBTQ Task Force issued a statement questioning the APA's decision to appoint Ray Blanchard and Kenneth Zucker to the DSM-5 working group for Gender and Sexual Identity Disorders, stating that, "Kenneth Zucker and Ray Blanchard are clearly out of step with the occurring shift in how doctors and other health professionals think about transgender people and gender variance."

=== DSM-5 paraphilias ===
In 2008, Blanchard was the lead author of an influential paper proposing the introduction of hebephilia in the DSM-5. The paper, coauthored mostly with colleagues from CAMH and the University of Toronto, triggered a number of reactions, many of them critical on the basis that it pathologizes reproductively valid behavior in order to uphold current social and legal standards. Critics include Richard Green, DSM-IV editor Michael First, forensic psychologist Karen Franklin, and Charles Allen Moser, while William O'Donohue argued that the proposal did not go far enough.

Blanchard also wrote the literature review paper for the DSM-5 committee regarding pedophilia, in which he summarized and attempted to address the criticism over the DSM-IV-TR definition of pedophilia. The DSM-5 diagnosis initially proposed a new name ("pedohebophilic disorder") and the rationale for the change cited several of Blanchard's scientific publications. In the end, the pedohebephilic disorder proposal was rejected, but the name was changed from pedophilia to pedophilic disorder, reflecting the DSM-5's general distinction between paraphilia and paraphilic disorder.

Blanchard noted that both Richard Green and William O'Donohue remarked that a so-called "contented pedophile"—an individual who fantasizes about having sex with a child, but does not commit child sexual abuse, but just masturbates fantasizing it, and who does not feel subjectively distressed afterward—does not meet the DSM-IV-TR criteria for pedophilia, because Criterion B is not met. Whereas Green proposed to solve the problem by removing pedophilia from the DSM, and O'Donohue proposed to remove criterion B for pedophilia, Blanchard proposed a general solution applicable to all paraphilias, namely a distinction between paraphilia and paraphilic disorder. The latter term is proposed to identify the diagnosable condition, which meets both Criterion A and B, whereas an individual who does not meet Criterion B, can be ascertained, but not diagnosed, as having a paraphilia. (Blanchard acknowledges Kenneth Zucker and James Cantor for discussions about this distinction). Interviewed by bioethics professor Alice Dreger, Blanchard explained: "We tried to go as far as we could in depathologizing mild and harmless paraphilias, while recognizing that severe paraphilias that distress or impair people or cause them to do harm to others are validly regarded as disorders."

== Views on transgender people ==
In a December 2017 article, Blanchard and J. Michael Bailey wrote an article for 4thWaveNow—a site that opposes gender-affirming care for young transgender people—supporting the concept of "rapid-onset gender dysphoria" (ROGD).

In an interview with Vice, Blanchard expressed the view that trans people, "should be considered as whatever their biological sex is plus the fact that they are transsexuals." Blanchard rejected the idea that treating gender dysphoria as a mental disorder contributes to stigma against the trans community, adding: "I mean, how many people who make a joke about trannies consult the DSM first?"

In November 2023, Blanchard stated on his official Twitter account that in his view "it’s irrelevant whether a man can become a woman or vice versa. What’s relevant is whether individuals tormented by the desire to be the opposite sex are happier when they present that way, and whether or how much the majority of society is willing to accommodate this."

== In popular culture ==
A character in the 2026 horror film Teenage Sex and Death at Camp Miasma is named after Blanchard.
