= Androphilia and gynephilia =

Sexual orientation to men/masculinity or women/femininity

In behavioral science, androphilia and gynephilia are sexual orientations: Androphilia is sexual attraction to men or masculinity; gynephilia is sexual attraction to women or femininity. Ambiphilia describes the combination of both androphilia and gynephilia in a given individual, or bisexuality. The terms offer an alternative to a gender binary homosexual and heterosexual conceptualization of sexuality.

The terms are used for identifying a person's objects of attraction without attributing a sex assignment or gender identity to the person. They may be used when describing intersex, transgender, and non-binary people.

== Historical use ==
=== Androphilia ===
Magnus Hirschfeld, an early-20th century German sexologist and physician, divided homosexual men into four groups: pedophiles, who are most attracted to prepubescent youth, ephebophiles, who are most attracted to youths from puberty up to the early twenties; androphiles, who are most attracted to persons between the early twenties and fifty; and gerontophiles, who are most attracted to older men, up to senile old age. According to Karen Franklin, Hirschfeld considered ephebophilia "common and nonpathological, with ephebophiles and androphiles each making up about 45% of the homosexual population."

The terms androsexuality and androsexual are occasionally used as synonyms for this orientation.

==== Alternate uses in biology and medicine ====
In biology, androphilic is sometimes used as a synonym for anthropophilic, describing parasites who have a host preference for humans versus non-human animals.

Androphilic is also sometimes used to describe certain proteins and androgen receptors.

=== Gynephilia ===
A version of the term appeared in Ancient Greek. In Idyll 8, line 60, Theocritus uses gynaikophilias (γυναικοφίλιας) as a euphemistic adjective to describe Zeus's lust for women.

Sigmund Freud used the term gynecophilic to describe his case study Dora. He also used the term in correspondence.

The variant spelling gynophilia is also sometimes used.

Rarely, the terms gynesexuality and gynesexual have also been used as synonyms.

== Sexual interest in adults ==
Following Hirschfeld, androphilia and gynephilia are sometimes used in taxonomies which specify sexual interests based on age ranges, which John Money called chronophilia. In such schemes, sexual attraction to adults is called teleiophilia or adultophilia. In this context, androphilia and gynephilia are gendered variants meaning "attraction to adult males" and "attraction to adult females", respectively. Psychologist Dennis Howitt writes:

Definition is primarily an issue of theory, not merely classification, since classification implies a theory, no matter how rudimentary. Freund et al. (1984) used Latinesque words to classify sexual attraction along the dimensions of sex and age:

Gynephilia. Sexual interest in physically adult women

Androphilia. Sexual interest in physically adult males

== Androphilia and gynephilia scales ==
The nine-item Gynephilia Scale was created to measure erotic interest in physically mature females, and the thirteen-item Androphilia Scale was created to measure erotic interest in physically mature males. The scales were developed by Kurt Freund and Betty Steiner in 1982. They were later modified by Ray Blanchard in 1985, as the Modified Androphilia–Gynephilia Index (MAGI).

== Gender identity and expression ==
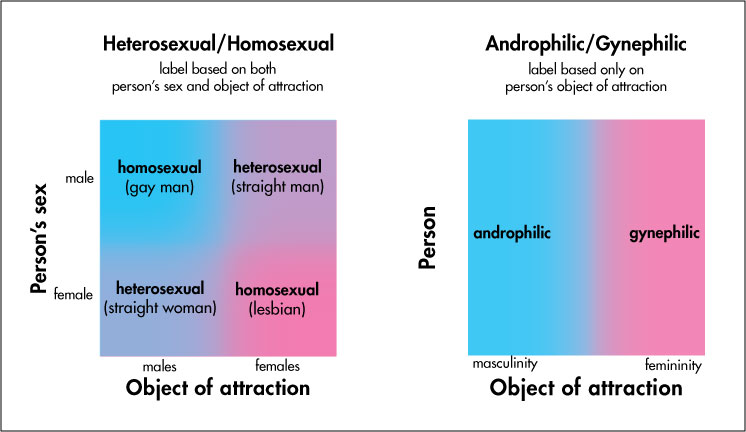
Diagram showing relationships of sex (X axis) and sexuality (Y axis). The homosexual/heterosexual matrix lies within the androphilic/gynephilic matrix, because homosexual/heterosexual terminology describes sex and sexual orientation simultaneously. This chart also shows how one's sexual attraction objective can be affected not by gender, but by masculinity and femininity.

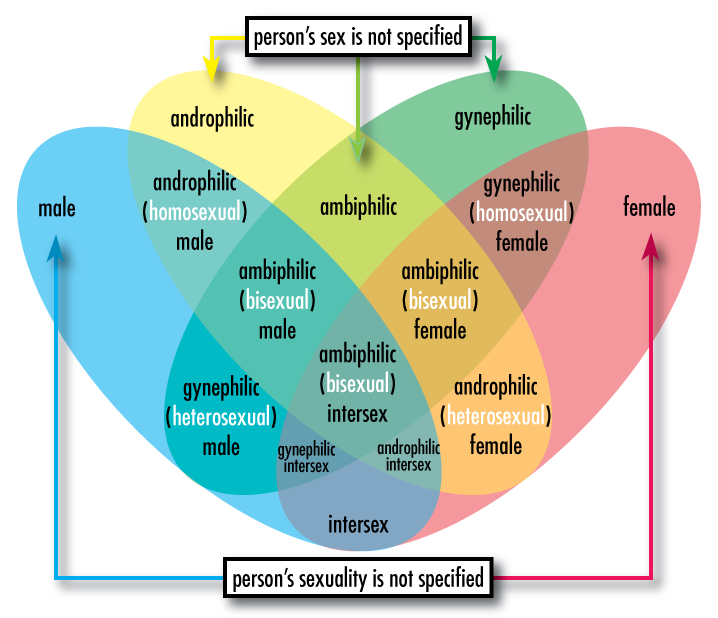
Venn diagram showing relationships of sex and sexuality. Descriptors within a homosexual/heterosexual matrix are in white, to show differences in androphilic/gynephilic matrix.

Magnus Hirschfeld distinguished between gynephilic, bisexual, androphilic, asexual, and narcissistic or automonosexual gender-variant persons. Since then, some psychologists have proposed using homosexual transsexual and heterosexual transsexual or non-homosexual transsexual. Psychobiologist James D. Weinrich has described this split among psychologists: "The mf transsexuals who are attracted to men (whom some call 'homosexual' and others call 'androphilic') are in the lower left-hand corner of the XY table, in order to line them up with the ordinary homosexual (androphilic) men in the lower right. Finally, there are the mf transsexuals who are attracted to women (whom some call heterosexual and others call gynephilic or lesbian)."

The use of homosexual transsexual and related terms have been applied to transgender people since the middle of the 20th century, though concerns about the terms have been voiced since then. Harry Benjamin said in 1966:

....it seems evident that the question "Is the transsexual homosexual?" must be answered "yes" and "no." "Yes," if his anatomy is considered; "no" if his psyche is given preference. What would be the situation after corrective surgery has been performed and the sex anatomy now resembles that of a woman? Is the "new woman" still a homosexual man? "Yes," if pedantry and technicalities prevail. "No" if reason and common sense are applied and if the respective patient is treated as an individual and not as a rubber stamp.

Many sources, including some supporters of the typology, criticize this choice of wording as confusing and degrading.

Biologist Bruce Bagemihl writes "...the point of reference for "heterosexual" or "homosexual" orientation in this nomenclature is solely the individual's genetic sex prior to reassignment (see for example, Blanchard et al. 1987, Coleman and Bockting, 1988, Blanchard, 1989). These labels thereby ignore the individual's personal sense of gender identity taking precedence over biological sex, rather than the other way around." Bagemihl goes on to take issue with the way this terminology makes it easy to claim transsexuals are really homosexual males seeking to escape from stigma. Leavitt and Berger stated in 1990 that "The homosexual transsexual label is both confusing and controversial among males seeking sex reassignment. Critics argue that the term "homosexual transsexual" is "heterosexist", "archaic", and demeaning because it labels people by sex assigned at birth instead of their gender identity. Benjamin, Leavitt, and Berger have all used the term in their own work. Sexologist John Bancroft also recently expressed regret for having used this terminology, which was standard when he used it, to refer to transsexual women. He says that he now tries to choose his words more sensitively. Sexologist Charles Allen Moser is likewise critical of the terminology.

Use of androphilia and gynephilia was proposed and popularized by psychologist Ron Langevin in the 1980s. Psychologist Stephen T. Wegener writes, "Langevin makes several concrete suggestions regarding the language used to describe sexual anomalies. For example, he proposes the terms gynephilic and androphilic to indicate the type of partner preferred regardless of an individual's gender identity or dress. Those who are writing and researching in this area would do well to adopt his clear and concise vocabulary."

Psychiatrist Anil Aggrawal explains why the terms are useful in a glossary:

Androphilia – The romantic and/or sexual attraction to adult males. The term, along with gynephilia, is needed to overcome immense difficulties in characterizing the sexual orientation of trans men and trans women. For instance, it is difficult to decide whether a transman erotically attracted to males is a heterosexual female or a homosexual male; or a transwoman erotically attracted to females is a heterosexual male or a lesbian female. Any attempt to classify them may not only cause confusion but arouse offense among the affected subjects. In such cases, while defining sexual attraction, it is best to focus on the object of their attraction rather than on the sex or gender of the subject.

Sexologist Milton Diamond, who prefers the term gynecophilia, writes, "The terms heterosexual, homosexual, and bisexual are better used as adjectives, not nouns, and are better applied to behaviors, not people." Diamond has encouraged using the terms androphilic, gynecophilic, and ambiphilic to describe the sexual-erotic partners one prefers (andro = male, gyneco = female, ambi = both, philic = to love). Such terms eliminate the need to specify the subject and focus instead on the desired partner. This usage is particularly advantageous when discussing the partners of transsexual or intersexed individuals. These newer terms also do not carry the social weight of the former ones."

Psychologist Rachel Ann Heath writes, "The terms homosexual and heterosexual are awkward, especially when the former is used with, or instead of, gay and lesbian. Alternatively, I use gynephilic and androphilic to refer to sexual preference for women and men, respectively. Gynephilic and androphilic derive from the Greek meaning love of a woman and love of a man respectively. So a gynephilic man is a man who likes women, that is, a heterosexual man, whereas an androphilic man is a man who likes men, that is, a gay man. For completeness, a lesbian is a gynephilic woman, a woman who likes other women. Gynephilic transsexed woman refers to a woman of transsexual background whose sexual preference is for women. Unless homosexual and heterosexual are more readily understood terms in a given context, this more precise terminology will be used throughout the book. Since homosexual, gay, and lesbian are often associated with bigotry and exclusion in many societies, the emphasis on sexual affiliation is both appropriate and socially just." Author Helen Boyd agrees, writing, "It would be much more accurate to define sexual orientation as either 'androphilic' (loving men) and 'gynephilic' (loving women) instead." Sociomedical scientist Rebecca Jordan-Young challenges researchers like Simon LeVay, J. Michael Bailey, and Martin Lalumiere, who she says "have completely failed to appreciate the implications of alternative ways of framing sexual orientation."

=== Gender in non-Western cultures ===
Some researchers advocate use of the terminology to avoid bias inherent in Western conceptualizations of human sexuality. Writing about the Samoan fa'afafine demographic, sociologist Johanna Schmidt writes:

Kris Poasa, Ray Blanchard and Kenneth Zucker (2004) also present an argument that suggests that fa'afafine fall under the rubric of 'transgenderal homosexuality', applying the same birth order equation to fa'afafine's families as have been used with 'homosexual transsexuals'. While no explicit causal relationship is offered, Poasa, Blanchard, and Zucker's use of the term 'homosexual transsexual' to refer to male-to-female transsexuals who are sexually oriented towards men draws an apparent link between sexual orientation and gender identity. This link is reinforced by mention of the fact that similar birth order equations have been found for 'homosexual men'. The possibility of sexual orientation towards (masculine) men emerging from (rather than causing) feminine gendered identities is not considered.

Schmidt argues that in cultures where a third gender is recognized, a term like "homosexual transsexual" does not align with cultural categories. She cites the work of Paul Vasey and Nancy Bartlett: "Vasey and Bartlett reveal the cultural specificity of concepts such as homosexuality, they continue to use the more 'scientific' (and thus presumably more 'objective') terminology of androphilia and gynephilia (sexual attraction to men or masculinity and women or femininity respectively) to understand the sexuality of fa'afafine and other Samoans." Researcher Sam Winter has presented a similar argument:

Terms such as 'homosexual' and heterosexual (and 'gay', 'lesbian', 'bisexual', etc.) are Western conceptions. Many Asians are unfamiliar with them, there being no easy translation into their native languages or sexological worldviews. However, I take the opportunity to put on record that I consider an androphilic transwoman (ie one sexually attracted to men) to be heterosexual because of her attraction to a member of another gender and a gynephilic transwoman (ie one attracted to women) as homosexual because she has a same-gender preference. My usage is contrary to much Western literature (particularly medical) which persists in referring to androphilic transwomen and gynephilic transman as homosexual (indeed as homosexual transsexual males and females, respectively).

== See also ==
- Androgynophilia
- Attraction to transgender people
- Gender-blind
- Index of human sexuality articles
