= Charles Allen Moser =

American physician and sexologist (born 1952)

- Born: 1952 (age 73–74)
- Education: Institute for Advanced Study of Human Sexuality; Hahnemann University
- Occupation: Physician
- Known for: transgender health, sex education
- Medical career
- Profession: Physician
- Research: LGBT sexology, paraphilias

Charles Allen Moser (born 1952) is an American physician specializing in transgender health, a clinical sexologist, sex therapist, and sex educator practicing in San Francisco, California. He is the author of numerous academic publications and books in the fields of transgender health, paraphilias including BDSM, and sexual medicine.

== Early life and education ==
Moser obtained his Bachelors of Science degree in physics at the State University of New York at Stony Brook, and a Master's in Social Work at the University of Washington in 1975. He obtained a Ph.D. at the Institute for Advanced Study of Human Sexuality in 1979, and his M.D. at Hahnemann University (Drexel) in Philadelphia. He interned at Mt. Zion and St. Mary's Hospital in San Francisco.

== Career ==
Prior to obtaining his M.D. in 1991, Moser was a Licensed Clinical Social Worker in California with a private psychotherapy practice specializing in the treatment of sexual issues.

Moser was a Professor and Chair of the Department of Sexual Medicine at the Institute for Advanced Study of Human Sexuality. The IASHS closed in 2018.

Moser founded the Diverse Sexualities Research and Education Institute (DSREI), a nonprofit organization supporting research and education on diverse sexualities, genders, and relationships, in 2017.

He has authored papers alone and with Peggy Kleinplatz in the area of sex therapy, and the classification of paraphilias. Moser and Kleinplatz argue that paraphilias should be removed from the Diagnostic and Statistical Manual of Mental Disorders (DSM). In a 2020 review, Moser and Peggy J. Kleinplatz examined the history and definitions of paraphilias and questioned the scientific usefulness of distinguishing paraphilic from other sexual interests.

== Honors ==
Moser is an inductee of the Society of Janus Hall of Fame.

== Works ==
- Moser, Charles (1989). "Sadomasochism". Journal of Social Work & Human Sexuality. 7 (1): 43–56. doi:10.1300/J291v07n01_04.
- Moser, Dr. Charles; Madeson, J. J. (September 1996). Bound to be free: the SM experience. Continuum. ISBN 978-0-8264-0889-1.
- Moser, Charles (1999). Health Care Without Shame: A Handbook for the Sexually Diverse and Their Caregivers. Greenery Press. ISBN 978-1-890159-12-2.
- Moser, Charles; Kleinplatz, Peggy J (January 2002). "Transvestic fetishism: Psychopathology or iatrogenic artifact". New Jersey Psychologist. 52 (2). New Jersey Psychological Association: 16–17.
- Moser, Charles (July 8, 2009). "Autogynephilia in Women". Journal of Homosexuality. 56 (5): 539–547. doi:10.1080/00918360903005212. PMID 19591032. S2CID 14368724.
- Moser, Charles (June 24, 2010). "Blanchard's Autogynephilia Theory: A Critique". Journal of Homosexuality. 57 (6): 790–809. doi:10.1080/00918369.2010.486241. PMID 20582803. S2CID 8765340.
- Moser, Charles; Hardy, Janet W. (December 2011). Sex Disasters...: ... And How to Survive Them. Greenery Press. ISBN 978-0-937609-54-5.
- Kleinplatz, Peggy J.; Moser, Charles (January 9, 2014). Sadomasochism: Powerful Pleasures. Taylor & Francis. p. 201. ISBN 978-1-317-76597-4.

== Awards ==
- 2009 SSSS-WR "Outstanding Contributions to Sexual Science" Award

== See also ==
- Blanchard's typology
- Hypersexual disorder
- Sadomasochism
- Sex reassignment therapy
- Sex therapy
- Sexual diversity
- Sexual dysfunction
- Transvestic fetishism
