= Paraphilia =

Atypical sexual interest

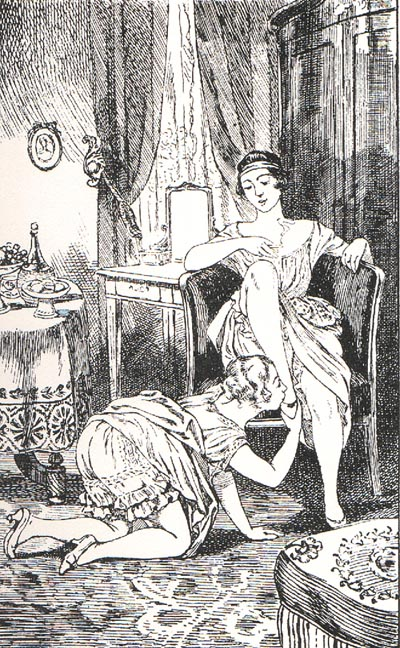
- Podophilia (foot fetishism), a paraphilia
- Etymology: παρά (para; other) + φιλία (philia; loving)
- Definition: Atypical sexual interest
- Coined by: Friedrich Salomon Krauss

Other terms
- Synonyms: Sexual perversion (1880s–1920; antiquated); Sexual deviation (1952–1980; antiquated; DSM and ICD); Fetish (1887–present); Kink (1970s–present; informal)
- Associated terms: Normophilia (antonym); Vanilla (antonym; informal)

A paraphilia (commonly known as a sexual fetish or kink) is an intense and persistent sexual interest, arousal or attraction to anything not typically considered so within a given culture. Paraphilias can be contrasted with normophilic sexual interests (those which conform to social norms), although the distinction remains controversial.

The exact number and taxonomy of paraphilia is under debate; Anil Aggrawal has listed as many as 549 types of paraphilias. Several sub-classifications of paraphilia have been proposed, though some argue that a fully dimensional, spectrum, or complaint-oriented approach would better reflect the evident diversity of human sexuality.

Although paraphilias were believed in the 20th century to be rare among the general population, subsequent research has indicated that some level of paraphilic interest is relatively common.

== Definitions & Terminology ==
There is no broad scientific consensus for definitive boundaries between what are considered "unconventional sexual interests", kinks, fetishes, and paraphilias. As such, these terms are often used loosely and interchangeably, especially in common parlance.

=== Etymology ===
Coinage of the term paraphilia (paraphilie) has been credited to Friedrich Salomon Krauss in 1903, and it was used with some regularity by Wilhelm Stekel in the 1920s. The term comes from the Greek παρά (para), meaning 'other' or 'outside of', and φιλία (-philia), meaning 'loving'. The word was further popularized by John Money in the 1980s as a non-pejorative designation for unusual sexual interests. It was first referenced in the DSM in its 1980 edition.

=== History of paraphilic terminology ===
Throughout modern history, many terms have been used to describe atypical sexual interests, and debate remains regarding the technical accuracy and perceptions of stigma associated with various labels today.

In the late 19th century, psychologists and psychiatrists began to categorize various paraphilias so as to have a more descriptive system than the legal and religious constructs of sodomy, as well as perversion. In 1914, Albert Eulenburg observed a commonality across paraphilias, using the terminology of his time writing, "All the forms of sexual perversion ... have one thing in common: their roots reach down into the matrix of natural and normal sex life; there they are somehow closely connected with the feelings and expressions of our physiological erotism. They are ... hyperbolic intensifications, distortions, monstrous fruits of certain partial and secondary expressions of this erotism which is considered 'normal' or at least within the limits of healthy sex feeling."

Before the introduction of the term paraphilia in the DSM-III (1980), the term sexual deviation was used to refer to paraphilias in the first two editions of the manual. In 1981, an article published in American Journal of Psychiatry described paraphilia as "recurrent, intense sexually arousing fantasies, sexual urges, or behaviors generally involving":

- Non-human objects
- The suffering or humiliation of oneself or one's partner
- Prepubescent children
- Non-consenting individuals

In 1988 John Money described paraphilia as "a sexuoerotic embellishment of, or alternative to the official, ideological norm". Paraphilia has also been defined as a sexual interest in anything other than a legally consenting human partner.

As of 2007, psychiatrist Glen Gabbard wrote that despite efforts by Wilhelm Stekel and John Money to destigmatize paraphilia, the connotation of the term remained "pejorative in most circumstances."

=== Criticism of common definitions ===
There is scientific and political controversy regarding the continued inclusion of sex-related diagnoses such as the paraphilias in the DSM, due to the stigma of being classified as a mental illness. Some groups, seeking greater understanding and acceptance of sexual diversity, have lobbied for changes to the legal and medical status of unusual sexual interests and practices. Charles Allen Moser, a physician and advocate for sexual minorities, has argued that the diagnoses should be eliminated from diagnostic manuals. Ray Blanchard stated that the definition of paraphilia in the DSM done by concatenation (i.e., by listing a set of paraphilias) and that defining the term by exclusion (anything that is not normophilic) is preferable.

=== Inclusion and subsequent exclusion of homosexuality ===
Homosexuality, a widely accepted variant of human sexuality, was once categorized as a sexual deviation. Sigmund Freud and subsequent psychoanalytic thinkers considered homosexuality and paraphilias to result from psychosexual non-normative relations to the Oedipal complex, although not in the antecedent version of the 'Three Essays on Sexual Theory' where paraphilias are considered as stemming from an original polymorphous perversity. As such, the term sexual perversion or the epithet pervert have historically referred to gay men, as well as other non-heterosexuals (people who fall outside the perceived norms of sexual orientation).

By the mid-20th century, mental health practitioners began formalizing "deviant sexuality" classifications into categories. Originally coded as 000-x63, homosexuality was the top of the classification list (Code 302.0) until the American Psychiatric Association removed homosexuality from the DSM in 1973. Martin Kafka writes, "Sexual disorders once considered paraphilias (e.g., homosexuality) are now regarded as variants of normal sexuality."

A 2012 literature study by clinical psychologist James Cantor, when comparing homosexuality with paraphilias, found that both share "the features of onset and course (both homosexuality and paraphilia being life-long), but they appear to differ on sex ratio, fraternal birth order, handedness, IQ and cognitive profile, and neuroanatomy." The research then concluded that the data seemed to suggest paraphilias and homosexuality as two distinct categories but regarded the conclusion as "quite tentative" given the current limited understanding of paraphilias.

== Development ==
Paraphilias typically arise in late adolescence or early adulthood. Persons with paraphilias are generally egosyntonic and view their paraphilias as something inherent in their being, although they recognize that their sexual fantasies lie outside the norm and may attempt to conceal them. Paraphilic interests are rarely exclusive and some people have more than one paraphilia. Some people with paraphilias may seek occupations and avocations that increase their access to objects of their sexual fantasies (e.g., voyeurs working in rental properties to "peep" on others or pedophiles working with Boy Scouts).

Research has found that some paraphilias, such as voyeurism and sadomasochism, are associated with more lifetime sexual partners, contradicting theories that paraphilias are associated with courtship disorders and arrested social development. Scientific literature includes some single-case studies of very rare and idiosyncratic paraphilias. These include an adolescent male who had a strong fetishistic interest in the exhaust pipes of cars, a young man with a similar interest in a specific type of car, and a man who had a paraphilic interest in sneezing (both his own and the sneezing of others).

Ego alien sexual interests in an individual can cause individuals to become suicidal due to the embarrassment or shame that it causes.

=== Causes and correlations ===
The causes of paraphilias in people are unclear, but it is believed to be a mixture of neurological, cultural, and psychodynamic factors. No two or more people with a paraphilia will develop it for the same reasons or be interested in the same qualities of the specific sexual interest. The specific causes of the development of paraphilic sexuality are numerous and vary from person to person. A 2022 study found that the development of paraphilic sexuality correlated with childhood trauma, particularly emotional abuse, neglect, and sexual abuse.

A 2008 study analyzing the sexual fantasies of 200 heterosexual men by using the Wilson Sex Fantasy Questionnaire exam determined that males with a pronounced degree of paraphilic interest had a greater number of older brothers, a high 2D:4D digit ratio (which would indicate excessive prenatal estrogen exposure), and an elevated probability of being left-handed, suggesting that "disturbed" hemispheric brain lateralization may play a role in paraphilic attractions. Behavioral explanations propose that paraphilias are conditioned early in life, during an experience that pairs the paraphilics stimulus with intense sexual arousal. Susan Nolen-Hoeksema suggests that, once established, masturbatory fantasies about the stimulus reinforce and broaden the paraphilic arousal.

Genetic causes, particularly genes that encode the behavior of neurotransmitter receptors and androgen release have been implicated in studies, though others have shown no correlation between genetics and paraphilic behavior.

It is possible for an individual to acquire a paraphilia from various types of brain lesions and epilepsy.

== Types ==
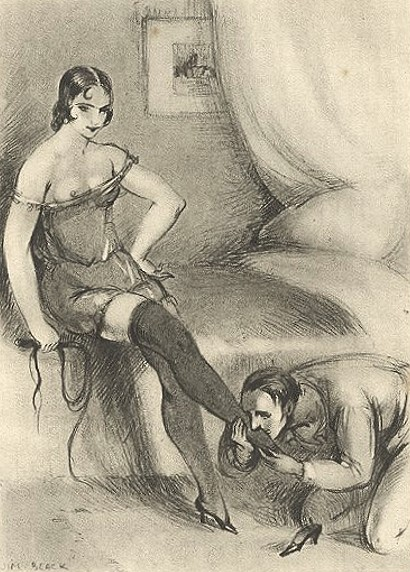
A submissive man worshipping a woman's foot, from Dresseuses d'Hommes (1931)

In a review of 48 cases of clinical fetishism in 1983, fetishes included clothing (58.3%), rubber and rubber items (22.9%), footwear (14.6%), body parts (14.6%), leather (10.4%), and soft materials or fabrics (6.3%). A 2007 study counted members of Internet discussion groups with the word fetish in their name. Of the groups about body parts or features, 47% belonged to groups about feet (podophilia), 9% about body fluids (including urophilia, scatophilia, lactaphilia, menophilia, mucophilia), 9% about body size, 7% about hair (hair fetish), and 5% about muscles (muscle worship). Less popular groups focused on navels (navel fetishism), legs, body hair, mouth, and nails, among other things. Of the groups about clothing, 33% belonged to groups about clothes worn on the legs or buttocks (such as stockings or skirts), 32% about footwear (shoe fetishism), 12% about underwear (underwear fetishism), and 9% about whole-body wear such as jackets. Less popular object groups focused on headwear, stethoscopes, wristwear, pacifiers, and diapers (diaper fetishism).

Erotic asphyxiation is the use of choking to increase the pleasure in sex. The fetish also includes an individualized part that involves choking oneself during the act of masturbation, which is known as auto-erotic asphyxiation. This usually involves a person being connected and strangled by a homemade device that is tight enough to give them pleasure but not tight enough to suffocate them to death. This is dangerous due to the issue of hyperactive pleasure seeking which can result in strangulation when there is no one to help if the device gets too tight and strangles the user.

Devotism involves being attracted to disability or body modifications on another person that are the result of amputation for example. Devotism is only a sexual fetish when the person who has the fetish considers the amputated body part on another person the object of sexual interest.

== Prevalence ==
Although paraphilic interests in the general population were believed to be rare, research has shown that fantasies and behaviors related to voyeurism, sadomasochism, and couple exhibitionism are not statistically uncommon among adults. The DSM-5 estimates that 2.2% of males and 1.3% of females in Australia engaged in bondage and discipline, sadomasochism, or dominance and submission within the past 12 months (2013). The population prevalence of sexual masochism disorder is unknown.

=== Among men ===
In a study conducted in a population of men, 62% of participants reported at least one paraphilic interest. In another sample of college students, voyeurism was reported in 52% of men.

=== Among women ===
Paraphilias are often observed in women, and there have been some studies focusing exclusively on females with paraphilias. Men and women differ on the content of their sexual fantasies, with men reporting greater proportions of fetishism, exhibitionism, sadism, and women reporting greater proportions of masochism. Sexual masochism has been found to be the most commonly observed paraphilia in women, with approximately 1 in 20 cases.

== History & Culture ==
=== Paraphilia in the ancient world ===
Paraphilic fantasies and behaviors have been registered in multiple old and ancient sources. Voyeurism, bestiality, and exhibitionism have been described in the Bible. Sexual relations with animals have also been depicted in cave paintings. Some ancient sex manuals such as the Kama Sutra (450), Koka Shastra (1150), and Ananga Ranga (1500) discuss biting, marks left after sex and love blows. Although evidence suggests that paraphilic behaviors have existed prior to the Renaissance, it is difficult to ascertain how common they were and how many people had persistent paraphilic fantasies in ancient times.

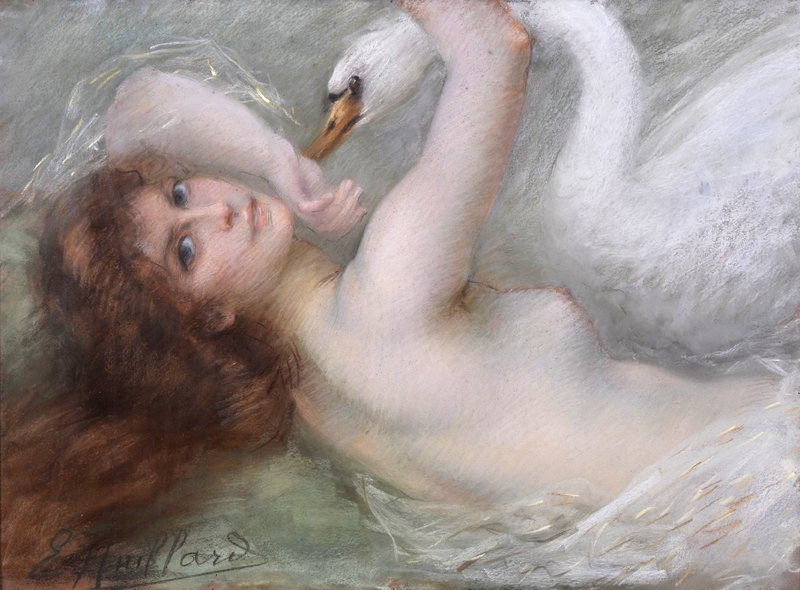
"Leda and the Swan" (from the Greek tale) by Esther Huillard

Bestiality has been depicted multiple times in Greek mythology, although the act itself usually involved a deity in zoomorphic form, such as Zeus seducing Europa, Leda, and Persephone while disguised as a bull, a swan, and a serpent, respectively. Zeus was also depicted, in the form of an eagle, abducting Ganymede, an act that alludes to both bestiality and pederastry. Some fragments of Hittite law include prohibitions of and permissions to engage in specific acts of bestiality.

Havelock Ellis pointed to an example of sexual masochism in the fifteenth century. The report, written by Giovanni Pico della Mirandola, described a man who could only be aroused by being beaten with a whip dipped in vinegar. Wilhelm Stekel also noted that Rousseau also discussed his own masochism in his Confessions. Other similar instances of persistent paraphilic fantasies were reported between 1516 and 1643 by Coelius Sedulius, Rhodiginus, Brundel and Meibomius.

== Health & Safety ==
=== Risk-Aware Consensual Kink (RACK) ===
Despite kinks being used for pleasure and enjoyment, there are some precautions people must take when participating in these actions. Especially with the rise of kinks and sexuality within recent years, this concerns young adolescents as they are more prone to indulging in risky sexual behavior. When referring to kinky behavior, it's suggested and implied that sexual practices are being conducted, which include but are not limited to BDSM, sexual and erotic behavior, fetishes, and more. Before conducting any of those behaviors, it's recommended to ask and verify for consent from all involved parties. The SSC (Safe, Sane, and Consensual) and RACK (Risk-Aware Consensual Kink) practices ensure consent and safety during kinky sex. After having the consent from the other participating party members, it's also recommended to have a safeword in place. This allows for any action to stop if a person feels it's getting out of hand

The risk of contracting HIV (Human immunodeficiency virus) and other sexually-transmitted diseases should be considered when engaging in any interpersonal sexual behavior, especially in the LGBTQ+ communities as same-sex relations may be more prone to HIV compared to heterosexual relations. Using condoms, minimizing the number of sexual partners, and using PrEP (Pre-exposure prophylaxis) can reduce the risk of HIV.

=== Paraphilic disorders ===
A paraphilic disorder is a mental disorder in which a paraphilia (sometimes called a sexual fetish or kink) involves people who do not consent, or causes marked distress which is not just due to rejection or fear of rejection, or significantly risks injury or death.

In the International Classification of Diseases, paraphilic disorders include exhibitionistic disorder, voyeuristic disorder, pedophilic disorder, coercive sexual sadism disorder, frotteuristic disorder, and other paraphilic disorders. The United States Diagnostic and Statistical Manual of Mental Disorders DSM-5-TR has a slightly different list, specifically including sexual masochism disorder and transvestic disorder.

Paraphilic disorders occur in adults and occasionally adolescents, but as the behaviour must be persistent. Many sex crimes are not due to such disorders.

== See also ==
- Sexual fetishism
- Kink (sexuality)
- Paraphilic disorder
- List of paraphilias
