= Transvestic disorder =

Paraphilic disorder

- Other names: Transvestic fetishism
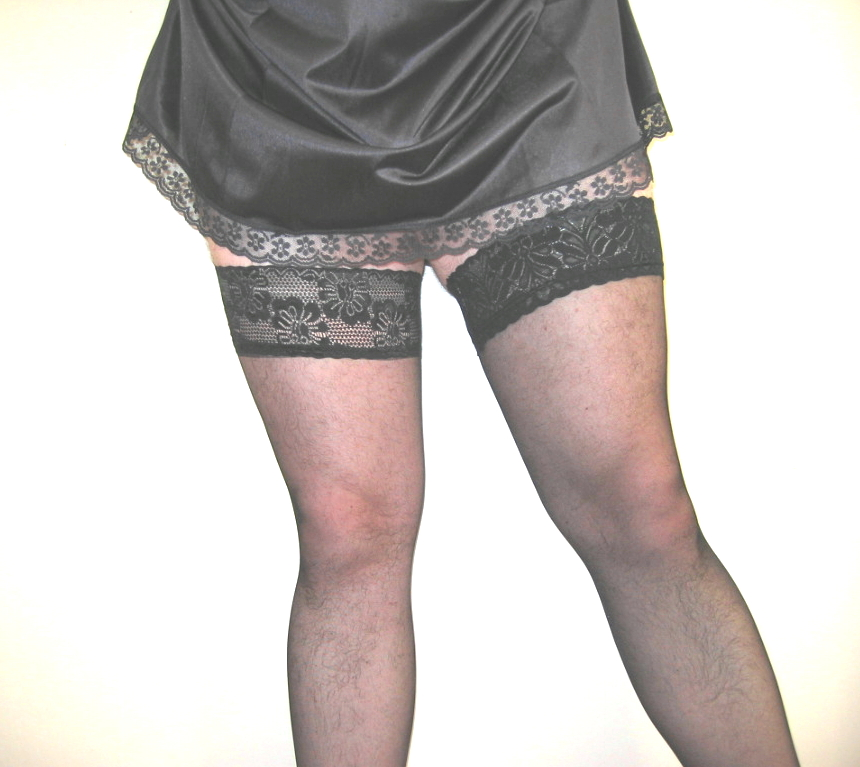
- A transvestite in black stockings.
- Specialty: Psychiatry
- Symptoms: Being sexually aroused by the act of cross-dressing and experiencing significant distress or impairment because of one’s behavior

Transvestic disorder (formerly transvestic fetishism) is a psychiatric diagnosis applied in some countries to people who are sexually aroused by the act of cross-dressing and experience significant distress or impairment – socially or occupationally – because of their behavior.

In countries which have adopted the World Health Organization standard ICD-11 CDDR, it is not a diagnosis, but has been deprecated in favor of the more general "Paraphilic disorder involving solitary behavior or consenting individuals".

In countries, such as the United States, which use the American Psychiatric Association's DSM-5, it is categorized as a specific paraphilic disorder. It differs from cross-dressing without distress or impairment, or for entertainment or other purposes that do not involve sexual arousal.

== Diagnosis ==
=== DSM-5 ===
According to DSM-IV, transvestic disorder (called fetishism at that time) was limited to heterosexual men; however, the DSM-5 does not have this restriction, and opens it to women and men with this interest, regardless of their sexual orientation. It is, however, usually documented in men.

There are two key criteria before a psychiatric diagnosis of "transvestic disorder" is made:

1. Individuals must be sexually aroused by the act of cross-dressing.
2. Individuals must experience significant distress or impairment – socially or occupationally – because of their behavior.

==== Criticism of DSM-5-TR ====
An academic criticism says that the main cause of distress is not within the individual but "external invalidation, systemic stigma, and structural barriers" from society.
