= Scientific transphobia =

Use of pseudoscience to justify transphobia

Scientific transphobia is the use of scientific language, decontextualized data, or biased research methodologies to pathologize, delegitimize, or deny the existence of transgender and gender non-conforming people. Most notably, this includes the belief that the human species has clear, biologically distinct sexes that are based on immutable traits, such as chromosomal makeup, that categorize all people as either fully male or fully female.

Some neurological and psychiatric explanations of trans identity rely on pathologizing assumptions about hormones, genetics, and neurological differences. Transgender identities are not considered pathological by the World Health Organization. In a 2023 review, Rachel N. Levin (a neurobiologist and relative expert in animal sexual behavior) and colleagues warned that biological studies of transgender identity could be misunderstood or misused by the media, politicians, and care providers, and recommended more inclusive and rigorous research practices.

== History ==
=== Christine Jorgensen and the birth of transsexuality ===
Scientific transphobia in the United States traces its early roots to the 1950s after the public transition of American actress Christine Jorgensen, which sparked widespread medical discourse regarding the legitimacy of "sex changes". While stories of gender transition were not absent from the news at the time, Jorgensen's story dominated the headlines and brought arguments regarding biological sex and gender identity to the forefront. Prominent sexologist and endocrinologist Harry Benjamin coined the term "transsexual" in his 1966 book The Transsexual Phenomenon after Jorgensen's transition to differentiate the act of cross-dressing and the medical transformation of gender, defying traditional conceptions of sex at the time as something that could not be changed. Critics, however, argued that transsexual people were "delusional" or had a perversion akin to homosexuality.

=== Attacks on gender transition ===
Janice Raymond's 1979 book The Transsexual Empire: The Making of the She-Male argued that transgender women were not real women, but rather were agents of the patriarchy that aimed at perpetuating sexist attacks on cisgender women, and that gender transitions reinforced regressive gender stereotypes.

Published during a time of heavy criticism of gender transition and clinic evaluations, Raymond's anti-transgender rhetoric is considered to have contributed to the closure of Johns Hopkins University's Gender Identity Clinic in 1979—the first U.S. program to offer gender-affirming surgeries—after director Jon Meyer and research partner Donna Reter reported insufficient psychological benefits based on follow-up studies. In particular, Meyer claimed that "surgery can't cure transsexuals. They never forget that they're only impersonating the other sex. What you're dealing with are deeply disturbed people whose problems won't vanish overnight." Of note, Paul McHugh, chair of psychiatry at Johns Hopkins at the time of the closure, was openly disapproving of gender-affirming surgeries and acknowledged that he intended to stop this practice at the clinic once he had become chair.

The closing of the Johns Hopkins Gender Identity Clinic may have inadvertently led to the closure of several other gender identity clinics running at the time, including those at Northwestern University, Stanford University, and Washington University in St. Louis.

=== DSM-III ===
Following a wave of anti-transgender rhetoric in the nation, the Diagnostic and Statistical Manual of Mental Disorders (DSM-III), published in 1980, formally introduced transsexualism and Gender Identity Disorder in Childhood (GIDC) under psychosexual disorders. Transsexuality was defined as a persistent discomfort with one's sex assigned at birth and a strong desire to live and be accepted as a member of the other sex, which includes a desire for hormonal and surgical intervention. GIDC described children who exhibited a strong and persistent cross-gender identification, with operationalized criteria for boys and girls.

The inclusion of transsexualism in the DSM-III was influenced by earlier work done by John Money, Harry Benjamin, Robert Stoller, and Richard Green, who argued that recognizing transsexualism could help standardize assessment and facilitate access to treatment. Despite this, these diagnoses were grouped with the section on psychosexual disorders, including paraphilias, psychosexual dysfunctions, and ego-dystonic homosexuality, furthering the public view of transsexuality as a sexual deviation rather than a natural gender variance.

In the DSM-V and ICD-11, transsexuality now appears as gender dysphoria and gender incongruence, respectively.

=== Autogynephilia ===
Canadian psychologist Ray Blanchard proposed his controversial autogynephilia theory of transsexuals in the 1980s, which classifies transgender women as either homosexual transsexuals—early-onset desire to transition due to attraction to men—or autogynephilic transsexuals—later-onset desire to transition due to sexual arousal at the fantasy of seeing oneself as a female. This theory drove ongoing debates around the legitimacy of gender transition, even though the theory has been critiqued as being reductive and unfalsifiable.

=== Rapid-onset gender dysphoria ===
In 2018, researcher Lisa Littman published a study on "rapid-onset gender dysphoria" (ROGD), positing that some adolescents identify as transgender and experience gender dysphoria due to peer influence and social contagion, especially those assigned female at birth. The publication faced wide criticism due to methodological issues, including the recruitment of parents from mostly anti-transgender forums who believed their children had ROGD, although some of these claims have since been countered.

== Key arguments ==
=== Genetics ===
Scientific transphobia posits that sex has chromosomal immutability: typical females possess two X chromosomes (XX), while males have one X and one Y (XY), where the SRY gene on the Y chromosome triggers testis development and male phenotype. Proponents of scientific transphobia claim that gender-affirming treatments cannot alter the genetic foundations of sex, thus rendering transitions superficial.

Critics of genetically-based scientific transphobia argue that biological sex is not as simple as a dichotomous XX/XY chromosomal makeup.

=== Neuroscience ===
The "male vs. female brain" dichotomy argues that there is innate sexual dimorphism in the human brain. Proponents of scientific transphobia claim that transgender brains align with natal sex, often in rebuttal to the traditional "man in a woman's body" description of transgender identity.

Neuroscience studies on transgender people produce mixed results, but generally suggest that brain structure in transgender people before hormonal treatment is more similar to that of the sex assigned at birth, and it may shift with hormonal treatment. However, there are also suggestions that the neuroanatomy of transgender people form a distinct pattern from cisgender people, rather than merely shifting along the dichotomous gender spectrum. Functionally, on "sex-stereotypical tasks", brain function in transgender people may already be more similar to gender identity before hormonal treatment.

=== Endocrinology ===
Scientific transphobia posits that males have immutable biological advantages over females, such as height differences or muscle differences, that cannot be changed through gender transition. This is often used to question sports equity, particularly for transgender women competing with cisgender women in sports.

=== Public Health ===
Scientific transphobia in public health frames gender-affirming care as experimental and ineffective, frequently citing things like regret or detransition rates recorded in public health studies.

=== Psychology ===
Scientific transphobia draws upon classification of gender identity as part of the current DSM-V and ICD-11, as well as alternative theories such as Blanchard's autogynephilia theory and Littman's social contagion theory, to argue that gender transitions are treating symptoms rather than the root cause of desire to transition, such as experiences of trauma, neurodivergence, or internalized homophobia.

== Effects of scientific transphobia ==
Researchers have cautioned about the possibility of public and media misinterpretation and misuse of biological studies on transgender identities and have suggested more thoughtful approaches in scientific practice, such as caution in sample recruitment, statistics, and interpretation of results.
