= The Transsexual Phenomenon =

1966 medical textbook by Harry Benjamin

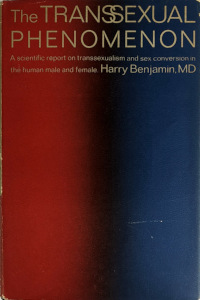
- Author: Harry Benjamin
- Language: English
- Subject: Sexology
- Publisher: The Julian Press
- Publication date: January 1, 1966
- Publication place: United States
- Pages: 296

The Transsexual Phenomenon is a medical textbook published by American endocrinologist and sexologist Harry Benjamin in 1966 with The Julian Press. The text is notable for its examination of transsexualism not as a psychological issue, but rather as a somatic disorder that should be treated through medicine. Benjamin argues that transvestism and transsexuality are a spectrum of conditions, requiring different treatments that ranged from hormone replacement therapy to surgical intervention (such as orchiectomy).

When initially published, the book was met with a mixed reception but would be later known as the "transsexuals' Bible", a standard for transsexual care in the medical community. Benjamin and his work (and specifically this text) are credited with the popularization of the term transsexual in medicine. However, some trans scholars argue that the book created many harmful stereotypes still perpetuated by the medical community today, such as the idea that trans people are "born in the wrong body". Scholars criticize Benjamin's reliance on the idea of "passing" and other cisnormative stereotypes. Overall, Benjamin's work was hugely influential in terms of trans visibility in the medical field and set the stage for transgender studies in the modern day. As a note, throughout his work, Benjamin defines a transsexual person as someone who identifies in opposition to their assigned gender at birth (designated by Benjamin as biological sex). In contemporary vernacular, this term can be encompassed under the transgender identity.

== Background information ==
In the 1920s and 30s, Harry Benjamin treated his first patient with cross-gender hormone therapy: a German crossdresser, Otto Spangler, with conjugated estriol (marketed as progynon), as well as x-ray radiation to sterilize the patient. While he saw various transgender people in his clinical practice, it was his work with Alfred Kinsey which would bring Benjamin into more consistent contact with transgender patients. The Transsexual Phenomenon, released in 1966, was the culmination of Benjamin's published work with the trans community. For example, "7 Kinds of Sex" from the popular sex education magazine Sexology was turned into the opening chapter "Symphony of the Sexes". "Transsexualism and Transvestism as Psycho-somatic and Somato-Psychic Syndromes", published in the American Journal of Psychotherapy in 1954, also provided a framework for The Transsexual Phenomenon.

== Summary ==
Benjamin begins his work by differentiating sex into 7 categories: chromosomal sex, morphological sex (developed secondary sex characteristics), genital sex (which, according to Benjamin, determines man or womanhood), germinal sex, hormonal sex, psychological sex, and social sex. He defines that the transsexual is someone whose psychological sex is in opposition to the other sexes. Thus, in treatment, the goal should be "a symphony of the sexes".

Benjamin differentiates transvestism, transsexualism, and homosexuality. He defines transvestism as dressing or presenting as the opposite sex, with no discomfort with genital or morphological sex. In contrast, the transsexual experiences intense discomfort around their body and seeks medical interventions in order to live as the opposite sex. The transsexual feels as though they were "born in the wrong body". From this differentiation, Benjamin created a 7-point scale, called the Sex Orientation Scale, which was based on Alfred Kinsey's scale of sexuality. A "Type 0" would be a person with no disagreement within their gender, or in modern terms, a cisgender person. The remaining Types 1-6 are a scale between transvestism and transsexualism, with the two identities acting as the poles.

Group 1	Type 1	Pseudo-transvestite
	Type 2	Fetishistic transvestite
	Type 3	True transvestite
Group 2	Type 4	Transsexual, non-surgical
Group 3	Type 5	True transsexual, moderate intensity
	Type 6	True transsexual, high intensity

Table 1: Harry Benjamin's Sex Orientation Scale (sometimes abbreviated to S.O.S).

Benjamin also notes how homosexuality is fundamentally different from both transvestism and transsexualism. In the closing of the section, he essentializes the difference to this: "The transvestite has a social problem. The transsexual has a gender problem. The homosexual has a sex[uality] problem."

After introducing the S.O.S scale, Benjamin goes into greater detail about each of these "types". The "pseudo-transvestite", a Type 1 on the S.O.S, does not dress as the opposite sex, but derives great enjoyment from transvestitic fantasy. In contrast, the true transvestite's central "deviation" is cross-dressing, with a strong emotional and sexual urge to do so. The transvestite can be fetishistic (Type 2) or "latent and basically transsexual", (Type 3) where the transvestitism evolves into transsexualism.

According to Benjamin, there is no one "so constantly unhappy (before sex change) as the transsexual." He documents that transsexual patients perform self-mutilation in order to more closely align their "genital sex" to their psychological one. In this discussion of genital sex, Benjamin also looks at the sexual activity of the transsexual. Sex can offer an outlet to express their femininity within a fetish, or simply to pass as a woman (in the case of prostitution). Benjamin emphasizes that sex change operations are essential to transsexual people (Types 5 and 6), but they are widely inaccessible and denied by healthcare providers. The inaccessibility of hormonal treatments, as well as societal stigma, make up "the handicaps of the transsexual".

Benjamin attempts to find the etiology of transsexualism. He concludes there are no genetic factors that influence the "condition" while finding a link to increased levels of hormones associated with the hormonal sex of the preferred gender. Of the psychological causes, Benjamin looks to both childhood conditioning and imprinting as possible etiologies. Childhood conditioning, from a Freudian perspective, appeared to be a very possible explanation, but Benjamin argues that there are too many situations in which an absent father does not lead to homosexuality, transvestism, or transsexualism.

He considers both psychotherapy and hormone therapy for trans women. Benjamin states that since the mind of the transsexual cannot be adjusted to the body, it is logical and justifiable to attempt the opposite: to adjust the body to the mind. He then continues on to detail estrogen therapy, noting the intended results, side effects, including breast growth, and ingestion methods, including oral and parenteral.

Benjamin next depicts methods of surgical intervention for transsexuals: namely, castration, penis amputation, and vaginoplasty, arguing for their use if a doctor deems it is the only way to help a patient to "a happier future". He notes several different methods of castration, describing that some surgeons prefer to leave the testicles in their undescended state for fear of legal retribution. Here, he also creates a set of guidelines for which transsexuals would make "convincing" women, and thus, should qualify for surgery, in his eyes, stating that "a heavy masculine build, a height of six feet or more, and a strong, dark beard were causes for worry and doubt." In a passage of particular importance to the rest of his work, he also notes four basic motives for a sex conversion operation: the sexual motive (as he describes it, the want for the possibility of heterosexual relations with a functioning vagina), the gender motive (or, the urgent need to relieve gendered unhappiness), the legal motive (the constant fear of discovery and arrest), and the social motive (the teasing the results from the perception of trans women as a feminine man).

Next, Benjamin considers 52 "male transsexuals" (trans women) and the results of their respective operations, noting that 33.3% reported a "good" result, 52.9% reported a "satisfactory" result, 9.8% reported a "doubtful" result, 1.9% reported an "unsatisfactory" result, and 1.9% reported an "unknown" result. The results of these findings pushed Benjamin to conclude, after additional consideration of possible sexual handicaps and a review of the "meager" array of medical literature at the time, that no matter how disturbed a transsexual may still be, they "are better off afterward [an operation] than they were before…"

Benjamin also considers the legal aspects of transvestism and transsexuality. Here, he presents an argument against the criminalization of transsexualism and transvestitism, comparing it to homosexuality, addiction, prostitution, and alcoholism as a social issue, not a criminal one. Here, he presents a legal remedy against the arrest of transvestites, based on a model used by the Hamburg Police Department:

Based on a physician’s certificate, the Hamburg police department issues a card to the transvestites, not giving them permission to “dress,” but merely stating that this person is known to the department as a transvestite. That is all, but it is enough to absolve the particular person from any suspicion of “criminal intent” in “dressing” and therefore from arrest.

Finally, Benjamin presents a single chapter considering "female transsexuals", trans men, of which he reports a 1:6 ratio with "male transsexuals". He connects this disparity to an observed lesser frequency of female homosexual behavior as well, but concedes that the symptomatology between male and female transsexuals is nearly identical, though he describes that female transsexuals wish for "typically masculine occupations… but often they have to be practical and settle for office work." He describes androgen injection as a useful medication to suppress menstrual periods, as well as total hysterectomy, and double mastectomy when desired.

The Transsexual Phenomenon concludes with four appendices. The first of which, written by Benjamin, presents a set of concluding remarks. He maintains that the etiology of transsexualism remains obscure, but points to neurology and psychology as disciplines that may provide answers. He predicts that sex reassignment surgery will be accepted as legitimate, operative techniques will be perfected, and legal reforms will follow, but concedes that the respective transsexual patient in the United States has to be born "lucky" to receive suitable treatment. Appendix B, written by Gobind Behari Lal, argues for the complementarity of the human sexes, and for a view of human beings with dual sexes, instead of opposite, of varying proportions. Written by Benjamin's colleague Richard Green, the penultimate appendix considers the history and mythology of transsexualism in Classical and indigenous society. The last appendix in Benjamin's work, compiled by R.E.L. Masters, consists of four autobiographies as well as three biographical profiles of transsexual patients. The book concludes with photographs of several of Benjamin's patients' genitals before and after operation.

== Publication history ==
The Transsexual Phenomenon was first published in 1966 by The Julian Press, and again in 1977 by Warner Press. It was also distributed in 1966 by Ace Publishing Company, and published electronically by Symposium Publishing, based in Düsseldorf, in 1999. On first publication, it was read and reviewed heavily in Germany, as well as the United States.

== Critical reception ==
Upon publication, the book had a mixed reception. The Winter 1966-67 issue of Psychoanalytic Review considered it "worthy of respect as a thoughtful digest of much work and a compassionate view of a phenomenon," but disappointing to psychologists and psychoanalysts. Real Life Guide, however, described it as readable, and to a very high standard of bookmaking. And though Homophile Studies reported frustration with the book for its unclear audience, and apparent promotion of conversion surgery, The American Journal of Psychotherapy described it as a "literary event", writing that "it is satisfying to see that Benjamin's long plea for the right of transsexuals begin to be successful."

== Cultural influence ==
The Transsexual Phenomenon has grown to be known as a "transsexuals' Bible" in scholarship. It is regarded as the first textbook on the subject of transsexualism, and it brought new legitimacy to transsexuality within medicine, helping to open gender identity clinics at Johns Hopkins University, University of Minnesota, Stanford University, and University of California, Los Angeles. Because of the publication of Benjamin's work, "the national picture changed from one of no significant institutional support for transsexual therapy and surgery in 1965 to a situation in 1975 where about twenty major medical centers were offering treatment and some thousand transsexuals had been provided with surgery." Indeed, historian Vern Bullough cites The Transsexual Phenomenon as so influential it singlehandedly popularized the term transsexual in American discourse. In fact, Sandy Stone documents that one can trace the influences of early sexologist David Oliver Cauldwell and Harry Benjamin based on the spelling of transsexual—Cauldwell sometimes only used one "s", while Benjamin always used two.

The Transsexual Phenomenon was the first medical text to seriously consider that it was possible for trans people to "successfully" live as the sex and gender they identify with. Thus, some have even argued that its legacy positions Harry Benjamin as the "founding father of contemporary Western transsexualism." in that "all subsequent published works by practitioners perpetuated the stereotype[s]" Benjamin helped to create. The influence of The Transsexual Phenomenon extends individually as well as systemically: for example, historian Susan Stryker also notes that San Francisco police officer Elliott Blackstone, an influential figure in the Compton Cafeteria Riots, became an outspoken advocate against police harassment of transsexuals after reading a copy of The Transsexual Phenomenon.

Benjamin's work has also been especially important for the discipline of trans theory, though its reception and influence here is mixed. In the seminal "The Empire Strikes Back: a Posttransexual Manifesto", Sandy Stone documents:

When the first clinics were constituted, Benjamin’s book was the standard reference. And when the first transsexuals were evaluated for their suitability for surgery, their behavior matched up gratifyingly with Benjamin’s criteria. The researchers produced papers which reported on this, and which were used as bases for funding. It took a surprisingly long time--several years--for the researchers to realize that the reason the candidates’ behavioral profiles matched Benjamin’s so well was that the candidates, too, had read Benjamin’s book, which was passed from hand to hand within the transsexual community, and they were only too happy to provide the behavior that led to acceptance for surgery.

In this manner, trans historians have argued that transsexuals at early gender clinics expressed Benjamin's criteria of "being in the wrong body" because they, too, had all read The Transsexual Phenomenon—and knew embodying Benjamin's descriptions was the path to the surgical affirmation of their gender identity.

Benjamin has also been heavily criticized for his endorsements of heteronormativity and cisnormativity throughout the text, his reliance on notions of "passing", his construction of gender success, and his criteria for "male transsexuals" who would make "suitable" women. Other contemporary critiques of Benjamin also include Jillian St. Jacques, who writes that the legacy of "The Transsexual Phenomenon" shrouds those who no longer identify as transsexual but resist "a return to an a priori sexual designation" in discourses of regret. Nearly 40 years later, Richard Ekins and Dave King published The Transgender Phenomenon, which presents both update and homage to Benjamin's work through chapters "Towards a Sociology of Transgendering", "Migrating Stories", "Oscillating Stories", "Negating Stories", and "Transcending Stories". In arguing that Benjamin's frameworks of transsexualism no longer fit the transgender communities he applied them to, Ekins and King consider a "gender outlaw... beyond the binary" view of transness through the framework of "transgendering", or the act of living between and "beyond" gender(s).

== See also ==
- Harry Benjamin
- Transgender studies
- Transgender rights
- Elliott Blackstone
- Richard Green (sexologist)
- Sandy Stone
- Susan Stryker
- Christine Jorgensen
