= Elliott Blackstone =

American activist

- Born: November 30, 1924; Aurora, Illinois
- Died: October 25, 2006 (aged 81)
- Occupation: Police Officer
- Years active: 1949-1975
- Known for: Work with the San Francisco LGBT community
- Military career
- Allegiance: United States
- Branch: United States Navy
- Conflicts: World War II

Elliott R. Blackstone (November 30, 1924 – October 25, 2006) was a sergeant in the San Francisco Police Department, known as a longtime advocate for the lesbian, gay and transgender community in that city.

== Early life ==
Born in Aurora, Illinois and raised in Chinook, Montana, Blackstone served in the U.S. Navy during World War II, and was honorably discharged. In 1949, he became a San Francisco police officer. He was a pioneer of what later became known as community policing. In 1962, he was designated as the department's first liaison officer with the "homophile community," as it was then called. Blackstone worked within the police department to change policy and procedures directed against the LGBT community, such as entrapment of gay men in public restrooms.

== LGBT advocacy and community relations ==
Though Blackstone had proposed the formation of a public relations program for the SFPD, it wasn't until after the "Gayola" scandal - which involved officers soliciting bribes from owners of gay bars in the Tenderloin - that a community relations unit was formed. Blackstone, who had been transferred to the Central City Station housing many of these bars, requested to join the unit after some time.

Throughout the 1960s and early 1970s, Blackstone worked closely with other local LGBT activist groups such as the Mattachine Society, Daughters of Bilitis, Conversion Our Goal, the Vanguard gay youth group, the National Transsexual Counseling Unit, and the Council on Religion and the Homosexual, as well as the Glide Memorial Church. Blackstone even took up a collection at his church to cover the costs of hormone treatments for transgender people, at a time when city-funded health clinics would not cover them.

Blackstone was involved in many other church and community activities and taught community policing courses at the College of Marin. He also led sensitivity trainings for the San Francisco Police Academy on gay and transgender issues, which every graduate had to take. At his retirement dinner in 1975, he was saluted by LGBT community leaders for his advocacy and support. In 2005, an interview with Blackstone was featured in Screaming Queens, a documentary about the 1966 Compton's Cafeteria riot.

=== Community-relations liaison ===
In the months following the Compton's Cafeteria Riot, Blackstone participated in efforts by the Tenderloin neighborhood organizing campaign to establish the Central City Anti-Poverty Program, as part of the War on Poverty under President Lyndon B. Johnson. The program included an office where Blackstone served as the community-relations liaison to the homophile community. Blackstone's introduction to advocating for the transgender community occurred when Louise Ergestrasse came into his office with a copy of The Transsexual Phenomenon by Harry Benjamin and demanded he do something for "her people." He didn't know a lot about transgender issues, but he was willing to learn and spent the next several years using his role as community liaison to help the transgender community.

Blackstone played a key role in changing the attitudes and practices of law enforcement. While the California Supreme Court struck down crossdressing laws in 1962, the practice of arresting individuals persisted for several years. Blackstone worked with the police department to dissuade them from arresting transsexual individuals for crossdressing or using the wrong restroom.

=== National Transsexual Counseling Unit ===
In 1968, the National Transsexual Counseling Unit was formed with financial backing from the Erickson Educational Foundation. It was the first peer-run advocacy and counseling group of its kind for transgender individuals. Blackstone managed the office as part of his role as SFPD's liaison. At the NTCU, he helped transgender individuals resolve conflicts with the law, employers, and social service agencies, and he helped social service agencies learn how to respond to transgender needs. While Blackstone received no salary for his managerial role, the EEF did pay for him to attend criminal justice conferences and police professional development meetings throughout the US, where he promoted his unique views on police treatment of transgender people and advocated for reforms.

Blackstone's work with the LGBTQ+ community received pushback from some fellow police officers, including a raid of the NCTU office in 1973. The raid was initiated after a police informant pretended to be romantically interested in one of the peer counselors and coerced her into bringing cocaine for him to work. During this raid, two peer counselors were arrested on suspicion of narcotics dealing, and an officer planted narcotics in Blackstone's desk in an attempt to frame him as well. Blackstone avoided prosecution but was removed from his role serving the transgender community, and reassigned to a foot patrol in a different district, where he remained until retiring in 1975.

=== Recognition and legacy ===
According to one source,

At the 2005 world premiere at the Castro Theater, Blackstone received a standing ovation from a sold-out crowd of more than 1000 people, when he answered an audience member's question; asked why, as a straight man, he had worked so hard on behalf of LGBT rights, he said, "Because my religion teaches me to love everybody."

In June 2006 Blackstone received commendations for his longtime advocacy work from the California State Senate, the California State Assembly, the San Francisco Police Commission, and the San Francisco Human Rights Commission. The Pride Foundation of San Francisco named him Lifetime Achievement Grand Marshal for the 2006 Gay Pride Parade.

== Death ==
Blackstone died of a stroke in 2006.

== See also ==
- Compton's Cafeteria riot
- National Transsexual Counseling Unit
