= Johns Hopkins Center for Transgender and Gender Expansive Health =

The Johns Hopkins Center for Transgender and Gender Expansive Health is a medical clinic as part of the Johns Hopkins Hospital providing gender-affirming care for transgender and gender-diverse people. The clinic first opened in 1966 under the name Gender Identity Clinic, founded by John Hoopes, former chief of plastic surgery at Johns Hopkins Hospital, and John Money. It remained open for 13 years until its sudden closure in 1979 due to pressure from Paul R. McHugh, who joined Johns Hopkins as chief of psychiatry in 1975 with the intent of ending the Gender Identity Clinic, and pushed for a study that claimed that there was no benefit for gender-affirming care.

In early fall of 2016, McHugh co-authored a new paper against gender-affirming care in the social conservative journal The New Atlantis. Following release of the paper, 600 members of faculty, students and alumni signed a petition for the university and hospital to disavow the paper. Shortly after, in October 2016, Johns Hopkins University School of Medicine issued a statement titled "Johns Hopkins Medicine's Commitment to the LGBT Community" with the intent to re-introduce gender-affirming care at Johns Hopkins.

The clinic re-opened in 2017 under the new name Johns Hopkins Center for Transgender and Gender Expansive Health which provides gender affirming care.

== History ==
=== 1966: Gender Identity Clinic ===
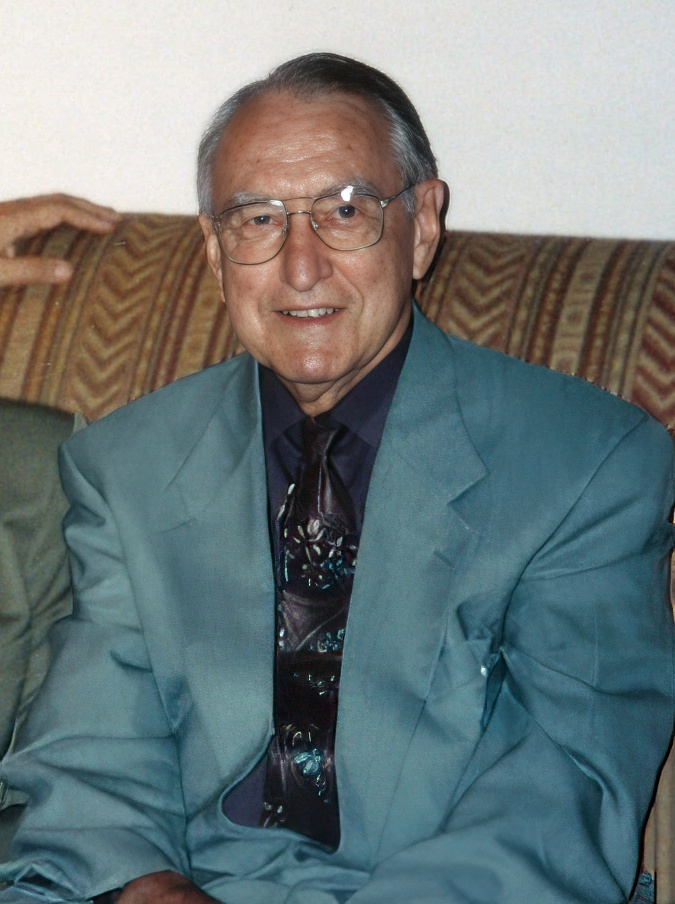
John Money, one of the founders of the original Gender Identity Clinic

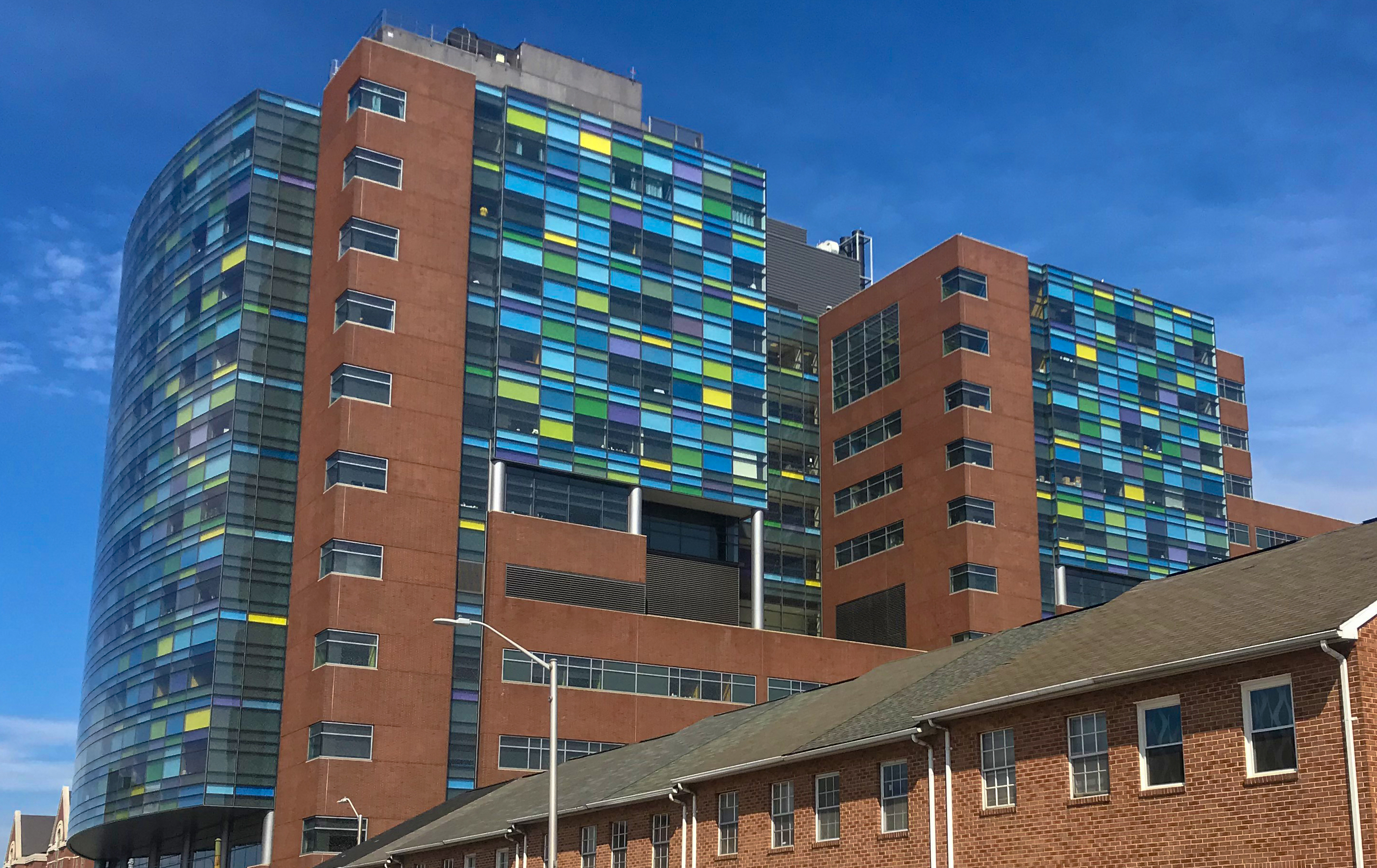
The Bloomberg Pavilion of Johns Hopkins Hospital in 2019

In November 1966, the Johns Hopkins University would publicly announce the founding of the Gender Identity Clinic, led by John Hoopes, who at the time was the chief of plastic surgery at Johns Hopkins Hospital. John Money, professor at Johns Hopkins University, would co-found the clinic with Hoopes. It would primarily receive funding from research organization Erickson Educational Foundation, started by Reed Erickson in 1964. The clinic was the first in the United States to offer gender-affirming surgery, and led to the opening of many other throughout the country throughout the 1960s and 1970s. The first feminizing surgery in the United States would be performed here, and combined with other such clinics founded afterward, would end up with approximately 500 cases six years after the founding of Johns Hopkins's Gender Identity Clinic. One-third of these cases were performed at university medical centers such as the one at Johns Hopkins, and initial studies done showed that the surgeries proved successful; transgender patients who underwent treatment had an increased quality of life when compared to before receiving surgery.

Hoopes was the inaugural director of the clinic, and while initially supportive of gender-affirming care, later became more critical of the practice as it became higher-profile and more widespread. He became worried of the potential for the procedures to become a burden on his department, even going so far as to separate the Gender Identity Clinic from the hospital's surgery department several years before its closure, instead moving it under obstetrics. This decision made it harder for the clinic to operate, depriving it of necessary resources. The clinic performed well in evaluations of patients after surgery, but to maintain such results, it was selective in the patients it would admit. This process required applicants to undergo gender affirming hormone therapy up to as long as five years before being eligible for surgery. Those who were heterosexual, perceived as more attractive and more likely to pass were more likely to be accepted. As a result, only 24 applicants out of 2000 received were accepted in the first two years of the clinic's founding.

In 1975, Paul R. McHugh was appointed chief of psychiatry at Johns Hopkins. McHugh was an outspoken proponent of the pathologization of LGBTQ patients, explicitly going to Johns Hopkins with the intent of ending the Gender Identity Clinic. McHugh was against gender-affirming surgery being offered to transgender individuals, saying it offered "no objective benefit", and was a major contributor towards the closure of the clinic. By the time McHugh became chief of psychiatry, however, Hoopes had already become skeptical of the clinic. By 1979, Hoopes with McHugh had petitioned psychiatrists Jon Meyer and Donna Reter to conduct a study on the efficacy and long-term results of gender-affirming surgery, and the clinic would shut down only months after this study was released. This would lead to not just the closure of the Gender Identity Clinic at Johns Hopkins, but also to many clinics around the country, with the study being a primary cause of these closures.

==== 2022 investigative research paper on the actual reasons of the closure ====
When the original Gender Identity Clinic closed in 1979, both the prevailing theory at the time and the official statement produced by Johns Hopkins attributed the closure of the clinic on the claim of evidence-based research; namely the 1979 Meyer study that claimed patients did not benefit from surgical procedures. However, in 2022, Walker J. Magrath — a medical student at Johns Hopkins School of Medicine — revealed that there was more to the clinic's trouble and closure than the 1979 study. Magrath's paper went through years of archived correspondence and notes to show that the closure was more accurately a leadership and politics issue rather than anything evidence-based. Hoopes, he revealed — despite being a proponent of the practice and the inaugural director of the clinic — was opposed to gender-affirming surgery by 1978. Magrath claims that Hoopes, among others, used the field of transgender care via gender-affirming surgery to popularize plastic surgery, and then discard it when it was no longer needed. In 1974, just 8 years after co-founding the clinic, Hoopes described rising disappointment with procedures, calling them "less than satisfactory", and characterizing gender-affirming surgery as "a facade constructed on what once was a male or a female." In this time, his view on his patients, who were transgender, also changed. Hoopes would describe them as "'psychopath,' 'masochist,' 'hysterical,' 'freakish,' and 'artificial'" in both his published writings and unpublished notes discovered by Magrath in his research. Before he would petition Meyer and Reter to publish their study, he was already outwardly and vocally skeptical of the efficacy of the work done at the Gender Identity Clinic.

In 1975, when McHugh would join Johns Hopkins as chief of psychiatry, he had already joined what Magrath describes as "a quorum of hospital leaders already intent on ending GAS at their institution." McHugh was vocal about his criticisms of LGBTQ patients and their treatment, but the paper claims that there was already a group of leaders within the hospital and school to end gender-affirming care and surgery towards transgender patients even before he joined. McHugh would later go on to claim he was the one who encouraged the Meyer study to be done, although notes sent by Hoopes still suggest otherwise. Later in 1978, one year before the closure, Hoopes would become concerned with how those in the field and at other facilities would view Johns Hopkins's work in gender-affirming care, which led him to petition Meyer and Reter for their 1979 study. When he wrote this letter to Meyer, he was at the time served as an editor for the journal he suggested to write the study for, the journal of Plastic and Reconstructive Surgery, published by the American Society of Plastic Surgeons — who Hoopes also would later go on to serve on the board of and become president. The same day that he sent the letter to Meyer, he also sent a letter to the current chairman of the Gender Identity Clinic, stating his intent to discontinue his and the plastic surgery division's work under the clinic, stating "This action was taken partially, perhaps, on the basis of personal bias, but largely on the basis of long-term clinical data regarding the efficacy of surgical procedures".

Magrath notes that while there have been alternate explanations as to why the clinic closed, none are the reason behind it and the troubles leading to it shutting down in 1979. He claims the end of the Gender Identity Clinic came down to rising anti-transgender bias and stigma that grew throughout the 1970s and early 1980s, which McHugh and Hoopes were only part of. He cites a statement in a 1974 paper by Stanford surgeon Donald Laub for this, stating that "The surgeon's reputation might be brought into question or damaged". This, along with the decreasing facilities and funding given towards the Johns Hopkins Gender Identity Clinic, is what led to its closure. As a result of the closure at Johns Hopkins, Magrath states that there were only two or three university clinics that practiced gender-affirming surgery by the mid-1990s, as opposed to nearly 20 that existed the year the Gender Identity Clinic was closed. He attributes the shift in tone during the 80s towards transgender, and ultimately LGBTQ people as a whole, as the main reason these clinics shut down; Johns Hopkins closing their clinic in 1979 and the Meyer study were a result of the changing times during the 1980s.

=== 1979–2017 ===
The Meyer study is what, at the time, was believed to have been the primary cause that led to the closure of the clinic and the ban on sex-reassignment surgery at Johns Hopkins University. After the Gender Identity Clinic was closed, the Women's Clinic where both it and the Department of OB-GYN was located, was demolished. This was the result of both a hospital board in May 1979 vote to demolish the building, as well as a planning committee to build a new psychiatry–neurosciences tower and parking garage over the lot, of which McHugh was heavily involved. Later in September, the medical board voted to ban sex-reassignment surgery, originally approved by a subcommittee headed by the chief of OB-GYN, and then later by the full board with support of the chief of surgery, who was the current chairman of the board. After the hospital board voted in favor of banning sex-reassignment surgery in 1979, along with the closure and demolition of the clinic months later, Meyer wrote an editorial to the American Journal of Psychiatry in 1981 to explain his study and the subsequent ban. He wrote:

"I believe the factors considered in the shift were not so much political ... as concerns about the following: the uncertainty of long-term gains, the genesis and dynamics of transsexualism, the performance of surgery of this magnitude for less than clear cut psychiatric indicators, and the allocation of surgical resources after 13 years devoted to transsexual surgery."

— Jon K. Meyer, sourced from The Fall of the Nation's First Gender-Affirming Surgery Clinic (Magrath, 2022)

Despite the closure of the Gender Identity Clinic, research and academia into the field of gender identity remained intact, even growing in 1979 and into the 1980s. In the late years of Johns Hopkins's clinic, many doctors involved organized research programs and scholarly conferences, leading to the formation of the Harry Benjamin International Gender Dysphoria Association in 1979. Started by German-American Harry Benjamin, an endocrinologist and sexologist, its mission is to "promote evidence based care, education, research, public policy, and respect in transgender health." The group has published the Standards of Care for the Health of Transgender and Gender Diverse People since its founding in 1979, which aims to provide guidance to healthcare providers on transgender care and methods to improve self-image and mental health, with the most recent version (SOC-8) released in 2022.

=== 2017–present: Johns Hopkins Center for Transgender and Gender Expansive Health ===
In October 2016, Johns Hopkins Medicine released a letter stating their intent to re-introduce gender affirming care. The announcement came shortly after a 134-page Fall 2016 publication written by Lawrence Mayer and co-authored by Paul McHugh was released in The New Atlantis, contending that gender identity and sexual orientation are not biologically determined, among other claims. Being published in New Atlantis, a conservative journal, it received traction among conservative media and was used to oppose support of transgender care and legislation. This led to Tonia Poteat, a former epidemiologist at Johns Hopkins Bloomberg School of Public Health, publicly denouncing the report. Shortly thereafter, over 600 students, faculty members, and others associated with the Bloomberg School of Public Health also denounced the paper, and petitioned the school to do so as well.

By the summer of 2017, Johns Hopkins University opened the Center for Transgender and Gender Expansive Health, also known as just the Center for Transgender Health, the successor to the original Gender Identity Clinic. The decision to resume services by the hospital was made "In an effort to reduce health care disparities and improve the overall health of the transgender community", in a Hopkins Medicine news publication. The reintroduction of the hospital's gender affirming care services came after nearly 40 years since the Gender Identity Clinic had closed. Since it opened, the Center for Transgender Health has worked in gender affirming care — including therapeutic services — and academic research into the field of transgender care. Much of its research has gone into regret post-operation and detransition, with a 2023 report published in the American Medical Association's surgical publication JAMA Surgery finding that less than 1% of transgender patients receiving gender-affirming surgery report regret with the procedures, where the average across all studies was 14.4%.

Despite Johns Hopkins's stated commitment to transgender care, as well as the discrediting of works and theories from McHugh and others about the efficacy of such care, both the clinic and the work done by the hospital has received criticism and lingering doubt because of its history. The Human Rights Campaign, in their 2018 Healthcare Equality Index, deducted 25 points from the total possible 100 due to the hospital's non-acknowledgement of the publication and work done by Meyer and McHugh to discredit gender-affirming care. They cited their 2017 exposé as well as Meyer and McHugh using their former Johns Hopkins affiliations to give weight to these topics, specifically claiming their intent to try and discredit leading scientific opinion, as the reasons for this deduction. The Washington Post's article about the re-opening of the clinic also cites McHugh's vocal opposition to surgery as treatment, but additionally claims the large gap between the closing of its original Gender Identity Clinic in 1979 and the opening of the Center for Transgender Care in 2017 are reasons why Johns Hopkins has not fully gained back its standing in the LGBTQ community.
