= Mary Elizabeth Clark =

American activist

Sister Mary Elizabeth Clark
- Born: June 16, 1938 (age 88)
- Other name: Joanna Michelle Clark
- Known for: Trans activist, AIDS educator and archivist
- Notable work: AIDS Education and Global Information System database

Sister Mary Elizabeth Clark (born 1938 in Pontiac, Michigan) is the main mover of the AIDS Education and Global Information System database, previously a pre-World Wide Web bulletin board system.

== Biography ==
Clark was born in June 1938 in Pontiac, Michigan and assigned male at birth.

In 1957, she enlisted in the United States Navy and rose to the rank of chief petty officer (E-7), serving as an instructor in anti-submarine warfare. Clark had an 11-year marriage which produced a son, but ended acrimoniously.

She married again, and later revealed her gender dysphoria to her second wife, who helped her through self-identifying as female. Upon learning of her psychological evaluations, the Navy discharged her honorably. In 1975, she underwent a sex reassignment surgery and took the name Joanna Michelle Clark.

A U.S. Army Reserves recruiter who was aware that she was transgender enlisted her as a woman in the Army in 1976. A year and a half later, she was nominated for promotion to warrant officer. Her enlistment was voided when her transgender status became known to higher-ups. She brought suit against the Army and won a settlement of $25,000 and an honorable discharge.

During the 1970s, she was an activist for the rights of transsexual people and was instrumental in winning the right of Californians to have their gender changed on their birth certificates and driver licenses. In 1980, she founded and led the ACLU Transsexual Rights Committee.

She had been raised Southern Baptist, but left the church due to disillusionment with racism in its congregations. In the 1980s, she felt a religious calling and worked to become an Episcopal sister. Conflict with the Episcopal diocese over the validity of the order she sought to found led to her leaving the denomination shortly after she took her vows in 1988, and she later became a sister of the American Catholic Church, a small independent Christian denomination following Catholic rites.

Also in the 1980s she continued the work of the Erickson Educational Foundation, aiding transgender people.

In 1990, inspired by meeting an isolated young man with AIDS in rural Missouri, she returned to her family home in San Juan Capistrano, California, taking on the bulletin board system AEGIS begun by Jamie Jemison and eventually building it into the "most definitive – and perhaps the most accessible – source of information on" AIDS.

== Awards and recognition ==
She is the recipient of the Award of Courage from the American Foundation for AIDS Research, the Jonathan Mann Award for Health and Human Rights from the International Association of Physicians in AIDS Care, the Crystal Heart award from the San Diego GLBT Center and the Joan of Arc award from the Orange County Community Foundation.
