= NTCU =

NTCU may refer to:

- National Taichung University of Education, Taiwan
- National Television Company of Ukraine
- National Transsexual Counseling Unit, US
