= Germinal =

Germinal may refer to:

- Germinal (French Republican Calendar), the seventh month of the calendar, approximately March 21 - April 19

== Émile Zola ==
- Germinal (novel), an 1885 novel by Émile Zola
  - Germinal (1913 film), a French silent film based on the Zola novel directed by Albert Capellani
  - Germinal (1963 film), a French film based on the Zola novel directed by Yves Allégret
  - Germinal (1993 film), a French film based on the Zola novel directed by Claude Berri

== Medicine ==
- Germinal epithelium (disambiguation), either:
  - Germinal epithelium (male), a layer of cells covering the testicle
  - Germinal epithelium (female), a layer of cells covering the ovary
  - Germinal epithelium or germ layer, a layer of cells formed during animal embryogenesis
- Germinal center, area of lymph tissue rich with B cells

== Other uses ==
- Germinal (journal), a Jewish anarchist journal from London
- Germinal (F735), a ship of the French Marine Nationale
- K.F.C. Germinal Beerschot, a Belgian football club
- Club Atlético Germinal, an Argentine football club
