= Reed Erickson =

American engineer, philanthropist, and transgender activist (1917 – 1992)

- Born: October 13, 1917; El Paso, Texas, United States
- Died: January 3, 1992 (aged 74); Mazatlán, Sinaloa, Mexico
- Education: Louisiana State University
- Occupations: Engineer; activist; philanthropist

Reed Erickson (October 13, 1917 – January 3, 1992) was an American engineer, activist, and philanthropist, as well as a transgender man who, according to sociology specialist Aaron H. Devor, largely informed "almost every aspect of work being done in the 1960s and 1970s in the field of gender affirmation in the US and, to a lesser degree, in other countries." He founded and ran the Erickson Educational Foundation (EEF), a nonprofit philanthropic organisation. Through the EEF, Erickson contributed millions of dollars to the early development of the lesbian, gay, bisexual, transgender, and queer (LGBTQ) movements between 1964 and 1984.

== Biography ==
=== Early life ===
Reed Erickson was born in El Paso, Texas on October 13, 1917, to a German-Jewish family. When Erickson was still quite young, the family moved to the Olney neighborhood of Philadelphia, Pennsylvania. Erickson attended Wagner Junior High and the Philadelphia High School for Girls. In high school, Erickson started using the nickname Eric when among friends. Following his graduation from high school, Erickson began attending a secretarial course at Temple University from 1936 to 1940. In 1938 his mother, Ruth, died.

In 1940, he and his family moved to Baton Rouge, Louisiana, where Erickson's father had transferred their lead smelting business. In Baton Rouge, Erickson worked in the family business and attended Louisiana State University (LSU). In 1946, Erickson became the first person assigned female at birth to graduate from LSU's school of mechanical engineering. Erickson graduated from the university as a member of several student and professional organisations, including Pi Mu Epsilon, Kappa Mu Epsilon, the American Society of Mechanical Engineers (ASME), and the Institute of the Aeronautical Sciences (IAS).

=== Career ===
After graduating from LSU, Erickson lived in Mexico for two years before moving back to Philadelphia. In Philadelphia he worked as an engineer until losing his job for refusing to fire a woman who was suspected of being a communist. During this time Erickson lived as a lesbian and was in an intimate relationship with a woman for several years. The couple supported Henry A. Wallace's 1948 campaign for presidency and were active in civil rights groups, as well as in gay and lesbian social circles. It is believed their political involvement led to harassment from the FBI and resulted in Erickson being blacklisted from jobs.

Unable to find work as a female engineer, Erickson and his partner moved to Baton Rouge, where he resumed working in the family business. He started an independent company, Southern Seating, making stadium bleachers. During this time Erickson was described as "looking masculine" due to his short hair and tailored clothes. He had begun cross-dressing when travelling outside of Baton Rouge and in the late 1950s he claimed he had travelled to Casablanca and Tijuana to begin taking testosterone.

After Robert Erickson's death in 1962, Erickson inherited a major interest in the family enterprises, Schuylkill Products Co., Inc., and Schuylkill Lead Corp., and ran them successfully until selling them to Arrow Electronics in 1969 for approximately $5 million. Erickson continued to be financially successful, eventually amassing a personal fortune estimated at over $40 million, most of which came from canny investments in oil-rich real estate, with Erickson's income often amounting to hundreds of thousands of dollars per month.

=== Philanthrophy ===
In June 1964, Erickson launched the Erickson Educational Foundation (EEF). The foundations' goal was “to provide assistance and support in areas where human potential seems limited by adverse physical, mental or social conditions, or where the scope of research was too new, controversial or imaginative to receive traditionally oriented support.” The EEF was initially funded and controlled entirely by Erickson.

The EEF funded many early research efforts into gender-affirming healthcare, impacting much of the work being done in the United States in the 1960s and 1970s and, to a lesser degree, in other countries. During the years 1964–1970 and 1972–1975 alone, the EEF donated approximately US$250,000 to support projects on transsexuality. In particular, the Harry Benjamin Foundation received over US$60,000 during 1964–1968, and the Johns Hopkins Gender Identity Clinic received approximately US$72,000 during the formative years of 1967–1973. This included the creation of the Harry Benjamin Foundation, the founding of the Johns Hopkins University Gender Identity Clinic, and other important research projects, including the National Transsexual Counseling Unit. The foundation also developed and maintained a referral network of service providers, like physicians and psychologists, mostly located in the United States.

The EEF held public offices in New York and Baton Rouge which were used to provide one-on-one emotional support and counselling for transgender people. They served as a referral service to peer support networks throughout San Francisco and New York City. The organization kept an archive of newsletters and periodicals relating to transgender people, including work by Rupert Raj, that they would disseminate copies to anyone on request.

Grants from the EEF supported the work of the early homophile organization, ONE, Inc., with their first collaboration on the Bibliography Project, resulting in ONE publishing the An Annotated Bibliography of Homosexuality in 1966. This work was further expanded, with a finalised two volume Annotated Bibliography of Homosexuality being published by Garland Press in 1976. The collection contained over 12,700 entries relating to homosexuality.

He also funded New Age Movement (an example being paying to print the first edition of A Course in Miracles), acupuncture, homeopathy, dream research, and John C. Lilly's dolphin communication studies. Sociologist Aaron Devor has written about Erickson's influence on the community through EEF and ONE Inc. However, the main centre of Erickson's attention through the EEF was transsexualism.

Multiple organisations and individuals have continued the work of EEF. The Janus Information Facility took over a number of responsibilities from EEF in 1977, including reprinting educational pamphlets for transgender people and their families, and conducting outreach to medical professionals, clergy, law enforcement personnel, and academics. In 1986, Sister Mary Elizabeth Clark and Jude Patton also continued some of the work of the EEF through their organization J2CP. Some pamphlets were also reprinted by Dallas Denny in 1993, following Erickson's death.

=== Personal life ===
In 1963, Erickson became a patient of Dr. Harry Benjamin. Erickson's official name change took place in 1963 with his sex reassignment surgery following in 1965, setting legal precedent in the state of Louisiana.

In 1965, he married for the first time. He remarried three times and was also a father to two children with his second wife.

Erickson acquired a leopard whom he named Henry. He and Henry became close, with Erickson even bringing Henry on plane rides. Guests to Erickson's home recall being introduced to the Henry and watching as Erickson play wrestled with the leopard.

In 1972 Erickson moved to Mazatlán, Mexico with his wife, children, and leopard. They lived in an extravagant home that Erickson had built and called the "Love Joy Palace".

Throughout the 1980s Erickson began increasingly using ketamine, becoming addicted to the drug. During this time he was repeatedly arrested for drug offences and often failed to appear in court. This led to the forfeiture of part of Erickson's estate and fortunes.

=== Death ===
At some point Erickson moved from Mexico, to Southern California. However, at the time of his death in 1992, he was again living in Mexico and addicted to illegal drugs. Due to US drug indictments he was a fugitive and unable to live in the United States.
