= National Transsexual Counseling Unit =

Peer-run transgender counseling and advocacy organization

- Abbreviation: NTCU
- Formation: January 1, 1968; 58 years ago
- Founded at: San Francisco, California, USA
- Dissolved: January 1, 1974; 52 years ago
- Type: Nonprofit organization
- Purpose: Peer-run advocacy and counseling for transgender individuals
- Location: San Francisco, United States
- Region served: Global
- Services: Street outreach, walk-in counseling, peer support
- Fields: Transgender advocacy, mental health, legal support
- Official language: English
- Key people: Elliott Blackstone
- Parent organization: Erickson Educational Foundation
- Funding: Erickson Educational Foundation

The National Transsexual Counseling Unit (NTCU) was the first peer-run advocacy and counseling program for transgender individuals. Founded in 1968, it was funded by the Erickson Educational Foundation. While previous efforts had been made to establish similar organizations, funding and support from the Erickson Educational Foundation helped the NTCU to enjoy significantly more success than previous organizations. The EEF hired Wendy Kohler, a patient of Harry Benjamin and a member of Conversion Our Goal (COG), a trans support group founded at GLIDE Memorial Church in 1967, to work as a research coordinator for Elliott Blackstone, the SFPD's LGBTQ+ community liaison officer. Kohler rented an office space and, with EEF funds, pay two full time peer counselors. These counselors provided street outreach, walk-in counseling, and answered mail from around the world. They would also frequently direct clients to the Center for Special Problems for additional support, such as identification cards that indicated transsexual status, and provided extensive referrals for services related to employment, mental health, legal problems, and more. The NCTU also sent peer counselors to give presentations to college classes, and wrote to newspapers and magazines to educate the public. Kohler also hosted a radio show for KQED twice a month, which broadcast live from Crown-Zellerbach Square. Kohler left in 1971. Suzan Cooke and Janice Maxwell joined the NTCU as peer counselors in 1971. In 1973, Leslie St. Clair and Wendy Davidson, who both worked with the Transgender Action Organization, were the center's co-directors.

Blackstone managed the NTCU office as part of his role as community liaison. (He was not paid by the EEF.) His roles through the police department included community relations as well as training officers on interactions with the LGBTQ+ community. While Blackstone was directly involved with the LGBTQ+ community and seeking to improve their relations with the police department, many members of the SFPD still viewed transsexuals unfavorably and sought to undermine the work of these community organizations. In 1973, some of these reactionary members of the SFPD employed an informant to pose as an individual seeking a romantic relationship with Janice Maxwell. After a few weeks, he asked her to bring cocaine to work, where officers were waiting to arrest her and Cooke. Maxwell was convicted on drug charges and spent about six months in jail; Cooke's attorney successfully had the charges against her dismissed.

These officers also planted drugs in Blackstone's desk in an attempt to frame him and stop or impede his progressive work within the department. While Blackstone avoided criminal charges, he was reassigned to a foot patrol in a different district and no longer directly involved with the LGBTQ+ community. The organization survived for a bit longer, but due to Blackstone's departure and a discontinuation of funding from the EEF, the NTCU closed in 1974.
