= The New Atlantis (journal) =

American journal

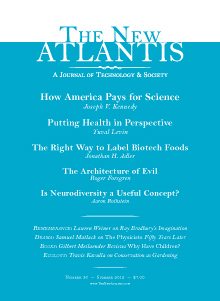
- Editor: Ari Schulman
- Frequency: Quarterly
- Publisher: The Center for the Study of Technology and Society, The Ethics and Public Policy Center
- Founded: 2003
- Based in: Washington, D.C.
- Language: English
- Website: https://www.thenewatlantis.com/
- ISSN: 1543-1215 (print); 1555-5569 (web)
- OCLC: 56518547

The New Atlantis is a journal founded by the social conservative advocacy group the Ethics and Public Policy Center, now published by the Center for the Study of Technology and Society. It covers topics about the social, ethical, political, and policy dimensions of modern science and technology. The journal is editorially reviewed but is not peer-reviewed on scientific topics. It is edited by Ari Schulman, having previously been edited by co-founders Eric Cohen and Adam Keiper.

The journal's name is taken from Francis Bacon's utopian novella New Atlantis, which the journal's editors describe as a "fable of a society living with the benefits and challenges of advanced science and technology". An editorial in the inaugural issue states that the aim of the journal is "to help us avoid the extremes of euphoria and despair that new technologies too often arouse; and to help us judge when mobilizing our technological prowess is sensible or necessary, and when the preservation of things that count requires limiting the kinds of technological power that would lessen, cheapen, or ultimately destroy us." Writing in National Review, the journal's editor Adam Keiper described The New Atlantis as being written from a "particularly American and conservative way of thinking about both the blessings and the burdens of modern science and technology". New Atlantis authors and bioethicists publishing in other journals have also similarly referred to The New Atlantis as being written from a social conservative stance that utilizes religion.

== Subjects ==
The New Atlantis tends to publish views in favor of technological innovation but wary of certain avenues of development. For example, the journal has generally advocated nuclear energy; space exploration and development through public–private partnerships, including crewed missions to Mars; biofuels; and genetically modified foods. It has expressed ambivalent or critical views about developments in synthetic biology, as well as military technologies like drones, chemical weapons, and cyberwarfare. Articles often explore policy questions on these and other issues, sometimes advocating particular policy outcomes, especially on health care, environmental management, and energy.

The journal has published widely on bioethics, including issues such as stem cell research, assisted reproduction, cloning, assisted suicide, organ and tissue donation, the purported link between vaccines and autism, and informed consent. Articles on these issues often highlight the potential for dangerous or degrading developments, including concerns over human dignity, with many articles examining human enhancement, and life extension, and historical precedents for abuse in eugenics and population control.

The journal also features broader philosophical reflections on science and technology, and tends to be skeptical of what its authors consider to be speculative overreach common in popular discussions. Examples include articles that have defended the existence of free will in light of developments in neuroscience, questioned the wisdom of using brain scans in courtrooms, and described how growing knowledge of epigenetics has undermined common claims about genetic determinism. While the journal has sometimes aired libertarian views about human enhancement and transhumanism, its contributors generally tend to question whether technologies like artificial intelligence, friendly artificial intelligence, and genetic enhancement are possible or desirable.

The journal has also published widely on the interpersonal effects of the Internet and digital technology. It has featured articles on subjects like Facebook, cell phones, multitasking, e-readers, GPS and navigation, virtual reality, and health influencers. A 2006 article by Matthew B. Crawford, who advocated the intellectual and economic virtues of the manual trades, was noted as a best-of-the-year essay by The New York Times columnist David Brooks, and was subsequently expanded into the bestselling book Shop Class as Soulcraft. The journal also frequently publishes essays on philosophical and literary questions relating to science and technology.

== Criticism ==
=== Sexuality and Gender Special Report ===
In August 2016, Paul R. McHugh, at the time a retired professor, co-authored a 143-page review of the scientific literature on gender and sexuality in The New Atlantis. In September 2016, Johns Hopkins University faculty members Chris Beyrer, Robert W. Blum, and Tonia C. Poteat wrote a Baltimore Sun op-ed, to which six other Johns Hopkins faculty members also contributed, in which they indicated concerns about McHugh's co-authored report, which they said mischaracterized the current state of science on gender and sexuality. More than 600 alumni, faculty members, and students at the medical school also signed a petition calling on the university and hospital to disavow the paper. Chris Beyrer, a professor at the public health school and part of the faculty group that denounced McHugh's stance, said, "These are dated, now-discredited theories." Brynn Tannehill, a board member of the Transgender United Fund wrote that "this isn't a study, it's a very long Opinion-Editorial piece."

== Other reception ==
Writing for the National Review in a 2003 column, the conservative author Stanley Kurtz described The New Atlantis as influential on thinking about science and technology. Richard John Neuhaus, former editor of the conservative journal First Things, wrote that The New Atlantis is "as good a publication as there is for the intelligent exploration of questions in bioethics and projections—promising, ominous, and fantastical—about the human future," and a writer in The American Conservative described the journal as a source "of fresh ideas on the Right." National Review columnist Jonah Goldberg described The New Atlantis as "a new and interesting magazine" that "seems to be trying to carve out the space for the government to stop the more offensive aspects of biotechnology."

Conversely, the liberal bioethicist Jonathan D. Moreno said that the journal offers "a very dark vision" about science and technology but that it "makes an important point about the need to worry about the ends as well as means in science", and that its "writers were young, smart, and had a good understanding of the political process and the making of public policy." Bioethicist Ruth Macklin criticized The New Atlantis as representative of a conservative movement in bioethics that is "mean-spirited, mystical, and emotional" and that "claims insight into ultimate truth yet disavows reason".

The journal has particularly gained a reputation among the transhumanist movement for its criticism of human enhancement. James Hughes, a techno-progressivist and at times director of organizations such as the World Transhumanist Association and the Institute for Ethics and Emerging Technologies, observes that the journal "has published influential attacks on artificial intelligence, nanotechnology, biotechnology, reproductive technology, and life extension". The artist and designer Natasha Vita-More, wife of British transhumanist philosopher, cryonicist, and author Max More, has described it as a "journal known as a ring of bioconservatives bent on opposing the cyberculture". Meanwhile, the organization founded by her husband, the Extropy Institute, has called it "a high-powered rallying point for the neo-Luddites".

== Book series ==
The New Atlantis publishes a book series, New Atlantis Books, an imprint of Encounter Books. As of December 2012, six books have been released:

- In the Shadow of Progress: Being Human in the Age of Technology ISBN 9781594032080 (2008), by Eric Cohen
- Imagining the Future: Science and American Democracy ISBN 9781594032097 (2008), by Yuval Levin
- Neither Beast nor God: The Dignity of the Human Person ISBN 9781594032578 (2009), by Gilbert Meilaender
- Merchants of Despair: Radical Environmentalists, Criminal Pseudo-Scientists, and the Fatal Cult of Antihumanism ISBN 9781594034763 (2012), by Robert Zubrin
- Why Place Matters: Geography, Identity, and Civic Life in Modern America ISBN 9781594037160 (2014), edited by Wilfred M. McClay and Ted. V. McAllister
- Eclipse of Man: Human Extinction and the Meaning of Progress ISBN 9781594037368 (2014), by Charles T. Rubin
