= Paul R. McHugh =

American psychiatrist

Paul McHugh
- Born: Paul Rodney McHugh; May 21, 1931 (age 95); Lawrence, Massachusetts, U.S.
- Education: Harvard University (BA, MD); King's College London
- Awards: Joseph Zubin Award (1995); Sarnat Prize (2008)
- Scientific career
- Fields: Psychiatry
- Workplaces: Cornell University; Johns Hopkins University

Paul Rodney McHugh (born May 21, 1931) is an American psychiatrist, researcher, and educator. He is currently the University Distinguished Service Professor of Psychiatry at the Johns Hopkins University School of Medicine, where he was previously the Henry Phipps Professor and director from 1975 to 2001.

He served as a co-founder and subsequent board member of the False Memory Syndrome Foundation, which raised skepticism about adults who claimed to have recovered delayed memories of childhood sexual abuse or incest. Throughout the 1990s, McHugh was active in challenging the idea of repressed memory and related claims of satanic ritual abuse.

McHugh opposes allowing transgender people to receive gender affirming surgery. He has described homosexuality as an "erroneous desire", and supported California's 2008 same-sex marriage ban. Scientists such as Dean Hamer argue McHugh misrepresents scientific literature on sexual orientation and gender.

McHugh was appointed to a lay panel assembled by the Roman Catholic Church to look into sexual abuse by Catholic priests in the United States.

== Early life and education ==
Paul McHugh was born in Lawrence, Massachusetts, the son of a Lowell High School teacher and a homemaker. He graduated in 1948 from Phillips Academy in Andover, Massachusetts, then attended Harvard University. In 1952, he graduated from Harvard College and then from Harvard Medical School in 1956. While at Harvard he was "introduced to and ultimately directed away from the Freudian school of psychiatry".

After medical school, McHugh's education was influenced by George Thorn, the physician-in-chief at the Harvard-affiliated Peter Bent Brigham Hospital (now Brigham and Women's Hospital). Thorn was disillusioned with Freudian psychiatry and felt that those who devoted themselves to it became single-minded, failing to improve as doctors. Thorn encouraged McHugh to develop a different career path, suggesting that he enter the field of psychiatry by first studying neurology. At Thorn's recommendation, McHugh was accepted into the neurology and neuropathology residency program at the Massachusetts General Hospital, where he studied for three years under Dr. Raymond Adams, chief of the neurology department.

McHugh then attended the Institute of Psychiatry in London, where he studied under Sir Aubrey Lewis and was supervised by James Gibbons and Gerald Russell. McHugh next went to the Division of Neuropsychiatry at Walter Reed Army Institute of Research.

== Career ==
After his training, McHugh held various academic and administrative positions, including Professor of Psychiatry at Weill Cornell Medical College (where he founded the Bourne Behavioral Research Laboratory), Clinical Director and Director of Residency Education at the New York Presbyterian Hospital Westchester Division. After reportedly being passed over for the Cornell chair in favor of Robert Michaels, he left New York to become Chairman of the Department of Psychiatry at the University of Oregon. During the 1960s, McHugh co-authored papers on hydrocephalus, depression and suicide, and amygdaloid stimulation. From 1975 till 2001, McHugh served as the Henry Phipps Professor of Psychiatry and the director of the Department of Psychiatry and Behavioral Science at the Johns Hopkins University. At the same time, he was psychiatrist-in-chief at the Johns Hopkins Hospital. He is currently University Distinguished Service Professor of Psychiatry at Johns Hopkins University School of Medicine.

His research has focused on the neuroscientific foundations of motivated behaviors, psychiatric genetics, epidemiology, and neuropsychiatry.

In 1975, McHugh co-authored (along with M. F. Folstein and S. E. Folstein) a paper entitled "Mini-Mental State: A Practical Method for Grading the Cognitive State of Patients for the Clinician". This paper details the mini mental state exam (MMSE), an exam consisting of 11 questions, that assesses patients for signs of dementia and other forms of cognitive impairment.

In 1979, in his capacity as chair of the Department of Psychiatry, McHugh ended gender reassignment surgery at Johns Hopkins Hospital. In 2017 the clinic was reopened.

In 1983, McHugh and colleague Phillip R. Slavney co-authored The Perspectives of Psychiatry, which presented the Johns Hopkins approach to psychiatry. The book "seeks to systematically apply the best work of behaviorists, psychotherapists, social scientists and other specialists long viewed as at odds with each other". A second edition was published in 1998.

In 1992, he served as a co-founder and subsequent board member of the False Memory Syndrome Foundation, which raised skepticism about adults who claimed to have recovered long-buried memories of childhood sexual abuse or incest. Throughout the 1990s, McHugh was active in debunking the idea of recovered memory, the idea that people could suddenly and spontaneously remember childhood sexual abuse.

In 1992, McHugh announced that he was going to leave Johns Hopkins and accept a position as director and CEO of Friends Hospital in Philadelphia. The Johns Hopkins School of Medicine sought to retain him and was successful in doing so. That year, McHugh was elected to the Institute of Medicine (IOM) - National Academies of Science - now the National Academy of Medicine.

McHugh treated author Tom Wolfe for depression suffered following coronary bypass surgery. Wolfe dedicated his 1998 novel, A Man in Full to McHugh, "whose brilliance, comradeship and unfailing kindness saved the day."

In 2001, McHugh was appointed by President George W. Bush to the President's Council on Bioethics. The Council was charged with the task of making recommendations as to what the U.S. federal government's policy regarding embryonic stem cells should be. McHugh was against using new lines of embryonic stem cells derived from in vitro fertilization but was in favor of the use of stem cells derived from somatic cell nuclear transfer (SCNT). In SCNT, the nucleus of a cell is removed and replaced by another cell nucleus. McHugh felt that cells created in this fashion could be regarded as merely tissue, whereas stem cells taken from embryos caused the killing of an unborn child.

In 2002, McHugh was appointed to a lay panel assembled by the Roman Catholic Church to look into sexual abuse by Catholic priests in the United States. This appointment was controversial, as McHugh had previously served as expert witness in the defense of numerous priests accused of child sexual abuse. David Clohessy, Director of the Survivors Network of those Abused by Priests, was appalled at McHugh's inclusion. McHugh said the furor surprised him, as his appointment was not related to recovered memories, telling the New York Times: "These are legitimate cases; they are not problematic cases; and they are scandalous cases".

In 2012, McHugh and Slavney published an essay in The New England Journal of Medicine criticizing the Diagnostic and Statistical Manual of Mental Disorders (DSM), which was soon to be published in its fifth edition. One of their main criticisms contends that the DSM, since its third edition, uses a top-down checklist approach to diagnosis rather than a thorough bottom-up approach. McHugh compared the DSM to a field guide used by amateur birders to identify birds.

McHugh was featured in a 2017 Netflix documentary, The Keepers, for his role in the defense in the 1995 trial, Jane Doe et al. v. A. Joseph Maskell et al., which was a case involving the sexual abuse of two women at the hands of a Catholic priest, Father Joseph Maskell.

== Gender, sexuality and gender-affirming surgery ==
McHugh opposes gender-affirming surgery for transgender people. In 1979, he shut down the Johns Hopkins Gender Identity Clinic, saying that another researcher found that most of the people he tracked down who had undergone this type of surgery "were contented with what they had done and that only a few regretted it. But in every other respect, they were little changed in their psychological condition. They had much the same problems with relationships, work, and emotions as before. The hope that they would emerge now from their emotional difficulties to flourish psychologically had not been fulfilled". He has said that medical treatment for transgender youth is "like performing liposuction on an anorexic child", described post-operative transgender women as "caricatures of women" because the surgery failed to change many of their male traits, and stated that "The transgendered suffer a disorder of 'assumption.'"

In his book The Man Who Would Be Queen, psychologist J. Michael Bailey writes that McHugh's concerns are "worth taking seriously", but criticizes McHugh's conclusions, saying "we simply have no idea how to make gender dysphoria go away. I suspect that both autogynephilic and homosexual gender dysphoria result from early and irreversible developmental processes in the brain. If so, learning more about the origins of transsexualism will not get us much closer to curing it."

McHugh signed a statement from the American College of Pediatricians (ACPeds) opposing transgender healthcare and characterizing trans people as being mentally ill. The Southern Poverty Law Center has classified ACPeds as an anti-LGBT hate group. According to an April 2016 report by the Southern Poverty Law Center, McHugh has held a number of transphobic positions, and has promoted Ray Blanchard's theory of autogynephilia:

"McHugh has held anti-trans views for years, disavowing healthcare options for trans people and pushing ideas like 'autogynephilia'—the idea that trans women's identities are predicated on sexual arousal with the idea of themselves as women."

McHugh considers homosexuality to be an "erroneous desire" and supported 2008 California Proposition 8. According to Deborah Rudacille, McHugh is willing to concede that scientists may one day find a biological explanation for gender variance, saying "If people are afflicted in fetal life by an abnormal hormonal thing, they can have all kinds of peculiar sexual attitudes when they come out".

=== The New Atlantis controversy and criticism ===
In August 2016, McHugh, at the time retired, co-authored a 143-page article on gender and sexuality in The New Atlantis, a non-peer-reviewed journal published under the auspices of the Ethics and Public Policy Center, a Christian-focused conservative think tank. In that article McHugh made the following assertion:

• The understanding of sexual orientation as an innate, biologically fixed property of human beings – the idea that people are "born that way" – is not supported by scientific evidence.
• The hypothesis that gender identity is an innate, fixed property of human beings that is independent of biological sex – that a person might be "a man trapped in a woman's body" or "a woman trapped in a man's body" – is not supported by scientific evidence.

In September 2016 Johns Hopkins University faculty members Chris Beyrer, Robert W. Blum, and Tonia C. Poteat wrote a Baltimore Sun op-ed, to which six other Johns Hopkins faculty members also contributed, in which they indicated concerns about McHugh's co-authored report, which they said mischaracterized the current state of science on gender and sexuality. More than 600 students, faculty members, interns, alumni and others at the medical school also signed a petition calling on the university and hospital to disavow the paper. Beyrer said "These are dated, now-discredited theories".

Geneticist Dean Hamer condemned McHugh's publication as a misrepresentation of scientific evidence and his own genetics research. Hamer criticized McHugh use of outdated and "cherry picked" studies, describing McHugh's calls for "more research" as "dubious" since McHugh has a "long history of blocking such efforts", including closing the gender identity clinic at Johns Hopkins. Hamer concludes that "when the data we have struggled so long and hard to collect is twisted and misinterpreted by people who call themselves scientists, and who receive the benefits and protection of a mainstream institution such as John Hopkins Medical School [sic], it disgusts me."

== Personal life ==
McHugh is a practicing Catholic. According to a 2002 New York Times article, he is a Democrat "who describes himself as religiously orthodox, politically liberal and culturally conservative – a believer in marriage and the Marines, a supporter of institutions and family values".

== Books ==
=== Author ===
- McHugh, P. R. (2006). Try to Remember: Psychiatry's Clash over Meaning, Memory, and Mind. New York: DANA.
- ---. (2008). The Mind Has Mountains: Reflections on Society and Psychiatry. Baltimore, MD: Johns Hopkins University Press.

=== Co-author ===
- Hedblom, J. H., & McHugh, P. R. (2007). Last Call: Alcoholism and Recovery.
- Fagan, P. J., & McHugh, P. R. Sexual Disorders: Perspectives on Diagnosis and Treatment.
- Neubauer, D. N., & McHugh, P. R. Understanding Sleeplessness: Perspectives on Insomnia.
- McHugh, P. R., & Slavney, P. R. (1998). The Perspectives of Psychiatry, 2nd ed. Baltimore, Maryland: Johns Hopkins University Press.

=== Editor ===
- McHugh, P. R., & McKusick. Eds. (1990). Genes, Brain and Behavior.
