= Benjamin scale =

Transsexualism typology

The Sex Orientation Scale (SOS) was Harry Benjamin's attempt to classify and understand various forms and subtypes of transvestism and transsexualism in people assigned male at birth, published in 1966. It was a seven-point scale (with three types of transvestism, three types of transsexualism, and one category for typical males); it was analogous to the Kinsey Scale as it relates to sexual orientation, which also had seven categories.

Much like Kinsey's understanding of sexual orientation, Benjamin understood the nature of gender identity and gender expression not as a discrete scale, but as a spectrum, a continuum with many variations. However the Benjamin scale does not reflect a modern understanding of gender identity, and is not useful as a contemporary diagnostic tool, especially due to its conflation of gender identity with sexual orientation.

Benjamin feared legal consequences for surgeons who performed sex reassignment surgery, and focused on the patients being able to pass and unlikely to regret their decision when deciding whether to recommend someone for an operation—in addition to possessing an unchanging gender identity.

== Sex Orientation Scale (S.O.S.) ==
Sex and Gender Role Disorientation and Indecision (Males)

Group	Type	Name	Kinsey scale
1	I	Transvestite (Pseudo)	0–6
1	II	Transvestite (Fetishistic)	0–2
1	III	Transvestite (True)	0–2
2	IV	Transsexual (Nonsurgical)	1–4
3	V	True transsexual (Moderate intensity)	4–6
3	VI	True transsexual (High intensity)	6

Benjamin noted, "It must be emphasized again that the remaining six types are not and never can be sharply separated."

Benjamin added a caveat:

It has been the intention here to point out the possibility of several conceptions and classifications of the transvestitic and the transsexual phenomenon. Future studies and observations may decide which one is likely to come closest to the truth and in this way a possible understanding of the etiology may be gained."

Benjamin's Scale references and uses Alfred Kinsey's sexual orientation scale to distinguish between "true transsexualism" and "transvestism".

== Modern views ==
Contemporary views on gender identity and classification differ markedly from Harry Benjamin's original opinions. Sexual orientation is no longer regarded a criterion for diagnosis, or for distinction between transsexuality, transvestism and other forms of gender variant behavior and expression. Modern views also exclude fetishistic transvestism from the spectrum of transsexual identity/classification, this type of transvestism is not related to gender expression or identity but is a distinctly sexual phenomenon most commonly practised by people who are neither transsexual nor homosexual. Benjamin's scale was designed for use with heterosexual trans women, and trans men's identities do not align with these categories.

== See also ==
- Classification of transgender people
- Harry Benjamin International Gender Dysphoria Association
- Transgender
