= Germinal epithelium =

Germinal epithelium can refer to:

- Germinal epithelium (female), a layer of cells covering the ovary
- Germinal epithelium (male), a layer of cells covering the testicle
- Germ layer, primary tissue layer formed during embryogenesis in animals

== See also ==
- Germinal (disambiguation)
- Epithelium
