= David Oliver Cauldwell =

American sexologist and writer

- Born: June 17, 1897; Cleveland, Ohio, U.S.
- Died: August 30, 1959 (aged 62); El Paso, Texas, U.S.
- Education: Chester College of Medicine and Surgery, Universidad Nacional Autónoma de México
- Occupations: Sexologist; neuro-psychiatrist; writer
- Known for: Coined the term "transsexual"

David Oliver Cauldwell (June 17, 1897 – August 30, 1959) was a prolific and pioneering sexologist, who coined the term transsexual as used in its current definition. Many of his monographs on sex, psychology, or health were published by Emanuel Haldeman-Julius in such forms as Big Blue Books. He was the editor of Sexology magazine's question and answer department. Cauldwell and Harry Benjamin were "two early and important American voices on transsexuality".

== Early life ==
Cauldwell was born on June 17, 1897, in Cleveland, Ohio, to Gilbert Cauldwell, a surgeon; and Virginia Oliver-Wright. Cauldwell reports himself as having had an interest in sexual anatomy since his childhood. He studied medicine at the Chester College of Medicine and Surgery (later merged with Loyola University Chicago) and at Universidad Nacional Autónoma de México.

== Career ==
After several years as a private general practitioner, Cauldwell became an Associate Medical Officer of the Department of War, and as a contract surgeon for the Army, and became a neuro-psychiatrist for the Department of War. In 1945, Cauldwell ended active practice to become a writer on topics of health, notably sexology. He frequently wrote tabloid advice columns, often writing about cross-dressing and gender-nonconforming people.

=== Writing on transsexuality ===
In 1949, he used the term "transexual" in his essay "Psychopathia Transexualis" to describe individuals whose sex assigned at birth was different from their gender identity. He was thus one of the first writers to use a term like "transsexual", although most notably, Magnus Hirschfeld wrote earlier of seelischer Transsexualismus (psychic transsexualism).

In "Psychopathia Transexualis" Cauldwell writes of his interactions with a transsexual man and discusses his thoughts on transsexuality. He pathologizes it, arguing that transsexuality is a psychopathic condition and a disease. He states that it is a mental immaturity caused by genetics and a dysfunctional childhood. Cauldwell acknowledges that many transsexuals are "well-integrated" but says that this is often because they were "transexuals by affectation only" and autosexual. Cauldwell concludes by hoping that social education and rehabilitation will erase transsexuality.

Cauldwell distinguished “biological sex” from “psychological sex”, and saw the latter as determined by social conditioning. He denied that there were modes of thinking intrinsically linked to male or female biology. Primarily because of this view of gender as plastic, and secondarily because of the limitations of medical science, he regarded sex reassignment surgery as an unacceptable response to transsexualism, and instead advocated that it be treated as a mental disorder. Despite his belief that transsexuality originated from an "unfavorable childhood environment", he advocated acceptance of homosexuality and transvestism.

==== Analysis ====
"Psychopathia Transexualis" is included in The Transgender Studies Reader, a seminal book in transgender studies published in 2006 by Susan Stryker and Stephen Whittle. They find the article problematic, contradictory, and influential, and note its academic value as a historic example of writing on transsexualism.

Stryker and Whittle find the article unusual for its emphasis on a genetic component of transsexuality, which was rarely argued in later psychological and scientific writing on transgender identity. They note that Cauldwell's thoughts on childhood environment are similar to those of Richard von Krafft-Ebing, Magnus Hirschfeld, Havelock Ellis, Robert Stoller, Richard Green, John Money, and Leslie Lothstein. The editors also note the article's focus on an anecdote about a transsexual man, which became an uncommon focus of writing on transgender topics until the 1990s due to Christine Jorgensen's immense publicity in 1952.

== Death ==
He died on August 30, 1959, in El Paso, Texas, of cirrhosis. He was buried in Evergreen Cemetery in El Paso, Texas.

== Works ==
[The titles of the Haldeman-Julius publications were chosen by or at the insistence of Haldeman-Julius, to provoke sales.]
