= Transsexual =

People experiencing a gender identity inconsistent with their assigned sex

A transsexual person is someone who experiences a gender identity that is inconsistent with their assigned sex or gender, and desires to permanently transition to the sex or gender with which they identify, usually seeking medical assistance (including gender affirming therapies, such as hormone replacement therapy and gender affirming surgery) to help them align their body with their identified sex or gender.

The term transsexual is a subset of transgender, but some transsexual people reject the label of transgender. A medical diagnosis of gender dysphoria can be made if a person experiences marked and persistent incongruence between their gender identity and their assigned sex.

Understanding of transsexual people has rapidly evolved in the 21st century; many 20th century medical beliefs and practices around transsexual people are now considered outdated. Historically, transsexual people were classified as mentally ill, thus facing significant barriers to gender-affirming care and other medical treatment; in many parts of the world, such barriers still exist.

== Terminology ==
Transsexual has had different meanings throughout time. In modern usage, it refers to "a person who desires to or who has modified their body to transition from one gender or sex to another through the use of medical technologies such as hormones or surgeries". Within the transgender community, the term is a subject of debate, and it is sometimes considered an antiquated or pejorative term. The more widely preferred terms are transgender or the abbreviated form trans. However, due to its historical usage, continued usage in the medical community, and continued self-identification with the term by some people, transsexual remains in the modern vernacular.

In understanding the subject, it is noted that there is a difference between gender and sex. Gender is defined as a "set of social, cultural, and linguistic norms that can be attributed to someone's identity, expression, or role as masculine, feminine, androgynous, or nonbinary". Sex is defined as being "assigned at birth by medical professionals based on the appearance of genitalia, and related assumptions about chromosomal makeup, gender identity, expressions, and roles [that] emerge over the life span, sometimes changing over time".

=== Origins ===
Norman Haire reported that in 1921 Dora Richter of Germany began a surgical transition, under the care of Magnus Hirschfeld, which ended in 1930 with a successful genital reassignment surgery (GRS). In 1930, Hirschfeld supervised the second genital reassignment surgery to be reported in detail in a peer-reviewed journal, that of Lili Elbe of Denmark. In 1923, Hirschfeld introduced the (German) term "Transsexualismus", after which David Oliver Cauldwell introduced "transsexualism" and "transsexual" to English in 1949 and 1950.

Cauldwell appears to be the first to use the term to refer to those who desired a change of physiological sex. In 1969, Harry Benjamin claimed to have been the first to use the term "transsexual" in a public lecture, which he gave in December 1953. Benjamin went on to popularize the term in his 1966 book, The Transsexual Phenomenon, in which he described transsexual people on a scale (later called the "Benjamin scale") of three levels of intensity: "Transsexual (nonsurgical)", "Transsexual (moderate intensity)", and "Transsexual (high intensity)".

=== Relationship to transgender ===
The term transgender was coined by John Oliven in 1965. By the 1990s, transsexual had come to be considered a subset of the umbrella term transgender. The term transgender is now more common, and many transgender people prefer the designation transgender and reject transsexual. Some people who pursue medical assistance (for example, gender affirming surgery) to change their sexual characteristics to match their gender identity prefer the designation transsexual and reject transgender. One perspective offered by transsexual people who reject a transgender label for that of transsexed is that, for people who have gone through sexual reassignment surgery, their anatomical sex has been altered, whilst their gender remains constant.

Historically, one reason some people preferred transsexual to transgender is that the medical community in the 1950s through the 1980s encouraged a distinction between the terms that would only allow the former access to medical treatment. Other self-identified transsexual people state that those who do not seek gender affirming surgery are fundamentally different from those who do, and that the two have different concerns, but this view is controversial. Others argue that medical procedures do not have such far-reaching consequences as to put those who have had them and those who have not (e.g. because they cannot afford them) into such distinctive categories. Some have objected to the term transsexual on the basis that it describes a condition related to gender identity rather than sexuality. For example, Christine Jorgensen, the first person widely known in the United States for having had gender affirming surgery (in this case, male-to-female), rejected transsexual and instead identified herself in newsprint as trans-gender, on this basis.

A common argument in opposition to the term transsexual is that it over-medicalizes the trans experience, focuses too much on diagnosis, or both. The term transgender emerged in part in an attempt to break the "medical monopoly" on transitioning that transsexual implied.

GLAAD's media reference guide offers the following distinction on the use of transsexual:

An older term that originated in the medical and psychological communities. As the gay and lesbian community rejected homosexual and replaced it with gay and lesbian, the transgender community rejected transsexual and replaced it with transgender. Some people within the trans community may still call themselves transsexual. Do not use transsexual to describe a person unless it is a word they use to describe themself. If the subject of your news article uses the word transsexual to describe themself, use it as an adjective: transsexual woman or transsexual man.

=== Terminological variance ===
The word transsexual is most often used as an adjective rather than a noun – a "transsexual person" rather than simply "a transsexual". As of 2018, use of the noun form (e.g. referring to people as transsexuals) was often deprecated by those in the transsexual community. Like other trans people, transsexual people prefer to be referred to by the gender pronouns and terms associated with their gender identity. For example, a trans man is a person who was assigned the female sex at birth on the basis of his genitals, but despite that assignment, identifies as a man and is transitioning or has transitioned to a male gender role; in the case of a transsexual man, he furthermore has or will have a masculine body. Transsexual people are sometimes referred to with directional terms, such as "female-to-male" for a transsexual man, abbreviated to "F2M", "FTM", and "F to M", or "male-to-female" for a transsexual woman, abbreviated "M2F", "MTF" and "M to F".

Individuals who have undergone and completed gender affirming surgery are sometimes referred to as transsexed individuals; however, the term transsexed is not to be confused with the term transsexual, which can also refer to individuals who have not undergone SRS, and whose anatomical sex (still) does not match their psychological sense of personal gender identity.

A rarer, alternate spelling for transsexual has been transexual, with a single S. This variation is British in origin. This spelling was used by The Transexual Menace, an activist group, for example. This spelling has been used by some activists in an attempt to remove "pathologizing implications" from their use of the word. Another rare variation, a synonym for transsexual, is transsex.

The terms gender dysphoria and gender identity disorder were not used until the 1970s, when Laub and Fisk published several works on transsexualism using these terms. "Transsexualism" was replaced in the DSM-IV by "gender identity disorder in adolescents and adults".

Male-to-female transsexualism has sometimes been called "Harry Benjamin's syndrome" after the endocrinologist who pioneered the study of dysphoria. As the present-day medical study of gender variance is much broader than Benjamin's early description, there is greater understanding of its aspects, and use of the term Harry Benjamin's syndrome has been criticized for delegitimizing gender-variant people with different experiences.

=== Sexual orientation ===
Since the middle of the 20th century, homosexual, transsexual and related terms were used to label individuals' sexual orientation based on their birth sex. Many sources criticize this choice of wording as confusing, "heterosexist", "archaic", and demeaning because it labels people by sex assigned at birth instead of their gender identity. Sexologist John Bancroft also recently expressed regret for having used this terminology, which was standard when he used it, to refer to transsexual women. He says that he now tries to choose his words more sensitively. Sexologist Charles Allen Moser is likewise critical of the terminology. Sociomedical scientist Rebecca Jordan-Young challenges researchers like Simon LeVay, J. Michael Bailey, and Martin Lalumiere, who she says "have completely failed to appreciate the implications of alternative ways of framing sexual orientation".

The terms androphilia and gynephilia to describe a person's sexual orientation without reference to their gender identity were proposed and popularized by psychologist Ron Langevin in the 1980s. The similar specifiers attracted to men, attracted to women, attracted to both or attracted to neither were used in the DSM-IV.

Many transsexual people choose the language of how they refer to their sexual orientation based on their gender identity, not their birth assigned sex.

=== Surgical status ===
Several terms are in common use, especially within the community itself relating to the surgical or operative status of someone who is transsexual, depending on whether they have already had gender affirming surgery, have not had but still intend to, or do not intend to have surgery. A pre-operative ("pre-op") transsexual person is someone who intends to have SRS at some point, but has not yet had it. A post-operative ("post-op") transsexual person is someone who has had SRS. GLAAD, an LGBTQ media advocacy organization, describes the terms "pre-op" and "post-op" as outdated, and recommends against their use by journalists and media outlets.

A non-operative ("non-op") transsexual person is someone who has not had SRS, and does not intend to have it in the future. There can be various reasons for this, from personal to financial. Having SRS is not a requirement of being transsexual. Evolutionary biologist and trans woman Julia Serano criticizes the societal preoccupation with SRS as phallocentric, objectifying of transsexuals, and an invasion of privacy.

== Historical understanding ==
Transgender people are known to have existed since ancient times. A wide range of societies had traditional third gender roles, or otherwise accepted trans people in some form. However, a precise history is difficult because the modern concept of being transgender, and gender in general, did not develop until the mid-1900s. Historical understandings are thus inherently filtered through modern principles, and were largely viewed through a medical lens until the late 1900s. The Hippocratic Corpus (interpreting the writing of Herodotus) describes the "disease of the Scythians" (regarding the Enaree), which it attributes to impotency due to riding on a horse without stirrups. This reference was well discussed by medical writings of the 1500s–1700s. Pierre Petit writing in 1596 viewed the "Scythian disease" as natural variation, but by the 1700s writers viewed it as a "melancholy", or "hysterical" psychiatric disease. By the early 1800s, being transgender separate from Hippocrates' idea of it was claimed to be widely known, but remained poorly documented. Both trans women and trans men were cited in European insane asylums of the early 1800s. One of the earliest recorded gender nonconforming people in America was Thomas(ine) Hall, a seventeenth century colonial servant. The most complete account of the time came from the life of the Chevalière d'Éon (1728–1810), a French diplomat. As cross-dressing became more widespread in the late 1800s, discussion of transgender people increased greatly and writers attempted to explain the origins of being transgender. Much study came out of Germany, and was exported to other Western audiences. Cross-dressing was seen in a pragmatic light until the late 1800s; it had previously served a satirical or disguising purpose. But in the latter half of the 1800s, cross-dressing and being transgender became viewed as an increasing societal danger.

William A. Hammond wrote an 1882 account of transgender Pueblo "shamans" [sic] (mujerados), comparing them to the Scythian disease. Other writers of the late 1700s and 1800s (including Hammond's associates in the American Neurological Association) had noted the widespread nature of transgender cultural practices among native peoples. Explanations varied, but authors generally did not ascribe native transgender practices to psychiatric causes, instead condemning the practices in a religious and moral sense. Native groups provided much study on the subject, and perhaps the majority of all study until after WWII.

Critical studies first began to emerge in the late 1800s in Germany, with the works of Magnus Hirschfeld. Hirschfeld coined the term "Transvestit" in 1910, borrowed from 19th-century French word travesti with the same meaning, as the scope of transgender study grew, and it was translated to English as "transvestite". His work would lead to the 1919 founding of the Institut für Sexualwissenschaft in Berlin. Though Hirscheld's legacy is disputed, he revolutionized the field of study. The Institut was destroyed when the Nazis seized power in 1933, and its research was infamously burned in the May 1933 Nazi book burnings. Transgender issues went largely out of the public eye until after World War II. Even when they re-emerged, they reflected a forensic psychology approach, unlike the more sexological that had been employed in the lost German research.

=== 20th century medical understanding ===
Although there are records of gender affirming surgery (SRS) going back to the 2nd century, the first modern types of such practice first appeared in the 20th century. In this context, Harry Benjamin suggested that moderate intensity male to female transsexual people may benefit from estrogen medication as a "substitute for or preliminary to operation". In Benjamin's view, people may have had gender affirming surgery even though they do not meet the definition of transsexual, while others do not desire SRS although they fit his definition of a "true transsexual". "Transsexuality" was included for the first time in the DSM-III in 1980 and again in the DSM-III-R in 1987, where it was located under Disorders Usually First Evident in Infancy, Childhood or Adolescence.

Beyond Benjamin's work, which focused on male-to-female (MTF) transsexual people, there are cases of the female to male transsexual, for whom genital surgery may not be practical. Benjamin gave certifying letters to his MTF transsexual patients that stated "Their anatomical sex, that is to say, the body, is male. Their psychological sex, that is to say, the mind, is female." Starting in 1968 Benjamin abandoned his early terminology and adopted that of "gender identity".

== Medical diagnosis ==
Transsexualism is no longer classified as a mental disorder in the International Statistical Classification of Diseases and Related Health Problems (ICD). The World Professional Association for Transgender Health (WPATH) and many transsexual people had recommended this removal, arguing that at least some mental health professionals are being insensitive by labelling transsexualism as a "disease" rather than as an inborn trait, as many transsexuals believe it to be. Now, instead, it is classified as a sexual health condition; this classification continues to enable healthcare systems to provide healthcare needs related to gender. The eleventh edition was released in June 2018. The previous version, ICD-10, had incorporated transsexualism, dual role transvestism, and gender identity disorder of childhood into its gender identity disorder category. It defined transsexualism as "[a] desire to live and be accepted as a member of the opposite sex, usually accompanied by a sense of discomfort with, or inappropriateness of, one's anatomic sex, and a wish to have surgery and hormonal treatment to make one's body as congruent as possible with one's preferred sex". ICD-11 renamed Transexualism as Gender incongruence of adolescence or adulthood (HA60), and Gender identity disorder of childhood was renamed Gender incongruence of childhood (HA61).

HA60 of the ICD-11 reads:

Gender Incongruence of Adolescence and Adulthood is characterised by a marked and persistent incongruence between an individual's experienced gender and the assigned sex, which often leads to a desire to 'transition', in order to live and be accepted as a person of the experienced gender, through hormonal treatment, surgery or other health care services to make the individual's body align, as much as desired and to the extent possible, with the experienced gender. The diagnosis cannot be assigned prior the onset of puberty. [HA61 applies before puberty] Gender variant behaviour and preferences alone are not a basis for assigning the diagnosis.

Historically, transsexualism has also been included in the American Psychiatric Association's Diagnostic and Statistical Manual of Mental Disorders (DSM). With the DSM-5, transsexualism was removed as a diagnosis, and a diagnosis of gender dysphoria was created in its place. This change was made to reflect the consensus view by members of the APA that the desire for gender affirming surgery is not, in and of itself, a disorder and that transsexual people should not be stigmatized unnecessarily. By including a diagnosis for gender dysphoria, transsexual people are still able to access medical care through the process of transition.

The current diagnosis for transsexual people who present themselves for medical treatment is gender dysphoria (leaving out those who have sexual identity disorders without gender concerns). According to the Standards of care formulated by WPATH, formerly the Harry Benjamin International Gender Dysphoria Association, this diagnostic label is often necessary to obtain gender affirming therapy with health insurance coverage, and the designation of gender identity disorders as mental disorders is not a license for stigmatization or for the deprivation of gender patients' civil rights.

== Causes, studies, and theories ==
=== Focus on trans women over trans men ===
Historically, formal efforts by the medical community to provide transsexual healthcare were extremely focused on transsexual women, with little thought for transsexual men. Julia Serano suggests that effemimania (the idea that male femininity is more psychopathological than female masculinity) was the driving factor. She sees this as a kind of transmisogyny (hatred of trans women as an extension of sexism). This effimimania conflates male homosexuality, transsexual women, and feminine gender expression, while treating them all as a disease. She points to the medical community's long love of now outdated theories such as autogynephilia.

== Medical assistance ==
Individuals make different choices regarding gender affirming therapy, which may include hormones, minor to extensive surgery, social changes, and psychological interventions. The extent of medical intervention is a highly personal decision: there is no one-size-fits-all solution.

=== Hormone replacement therapy ===
Transsexual individuals frequently opt for masculinizing or feminizing hormone replacement therapy (HRT) to modify secondary sex characteristics.

=== Sex reassignment therapy ===
Sex reassignment therapy (SRT) is an umbrella term for all medical treatments related to gender affirming of both transgender and intersex people. Sex reassignment surgery (such as orchiectomy) alters primary sex characteristics, including chest surgery such as top surgery or breast augmentation, or, in the case of trans women, a trachea shave, facial feminization surgery or permanent hair removal.

To obtain gender affirming therapy, transsexual people are generally required to undergo a psychological evaluation and receive a diagnosis of gender identity disorder in accordance with the Standards of Care (SOC) as published by the World Professional Association for Transgender Health. This assessment is usually accompanied by counseling on issues of adjustment to the desired gender role, effects and risks of medical treatments, and sometimes also by psychological therapy. The SOC are intended as guidelines, not inflexible rules, and are intended to ensure that clients are properly informed and in sound psychological health, and to discourage people from transitioning based on unrealistic expectations.

==== Gender roles and transitioning ====
After an initial psychological evaluation, trans men and trans women may begin medical treatment, starting with hormone replacement therapy or hormone blockers. In these cases, people who change their gender are usually required to live as members of their target gender for at least one year prior to genital surgery, gaining real-life experience, which is sometimes called the "real-life test" (RLT). Transsexual individuals may undergo some, all, or none of the medical procedures available, depending on personal feelings, health, income, and other considerations. Some people posit that transsexualism is a physical condition, not a psychological issue, and assert that gender affirming therapy should be given on request. (Brown 103)

Like other trans people, transsexual people may refer to themselves as trans men or trans women. Transsexual people desire to establish a permanent gender role as a member of the gender with which they identify, and many transsexual people pursue medical interventions as part of the process of expressing their gender. The entire process of switching from one physical sex and social gender presentation to another is often referred to as transitioning, and usually takes several years. Transsexual people who transition usually change their social gender roles, legal names and legal sex designation.

Not all transsexual people undergo a physical transition. Some have obstacles or concerns preventing them from doing so, such as the expense of surgery, the risk of medical complications, or medical conditions which make the use of hormones or surgery dangerous. Others may not identify strongly with another binary gender role. Still others may find balance at a midpoint during the process, regardless of whether or not they are binary-identified. Many transsexual people, including binary-identified transsexual people, do not undergo genital surgery, because they are comfortable with their own genitals, or because they are concerned about nerve damage and the potential loss of sexual pleasure, including orgasm. This is especially so in the case of trans men, many of whom are dissatisfied with the current state of phalloplasty, which is typically very expensive, not covered by health insurance, and commonly does not achieve desired results. For example, not only does phalloplasty not result in a completely natural erection, it may not allow for an erection at all, and its results commonly lack penile sexual sensitivity; in other cases, however, phalloplasty results are satisfying for trans men. By contrast, metoidioplasty, which is more popular, is significantly less expensive and has far better sexual results.

Transsexual people can be heterosexual, gay, lesbian, or bisexual; many choose the language of how they refer to their sexual orientation based on their gender identity, not their birth assigned sex.

=== Psychological treatment ===
Psychological techniques that attempt to alter gender identity to one considered appropriate for the person's assigned sex, aka conversion therapy, are ineffective. The widely recognized Standards of Care note that sometimes the only reasonable and effective course of treatment for transsexual people is to go through gender affirming therapy.

The need for treatment of transsexual people is emphasized by the high rate of mental health problems, including depression, anxiety, and various addictions, as well as a higher suicide rate among untreated transsexual people than in the general population. These problems are alleviated by a change of gender role and/or physical characteristics.

Many transgender and transsexual activists, and many caregivers, note that these problems are not usually related to the gender identity issues themselves, but the social and cultural responses to gender-variant individuals. Some transsexual people reject the counseling that is recommended by the Standards of Care because they do not consider their gender identity to be a cause of psychological problems.

Brown and Rounsley noted that "some transsexual people acquiesce to legal and medical expectations in order to gain rights granted through the medical/psychological hierarchy." Legal needs, such as a change of sex on legal documents, and medical needs, such as gender affirming surgery, are usually difficult to obtain without a doctor or therapist's approval. Because of this, some transsexual people feel coerced into affirming outdated concepts of gender to overcome simple legal and medical hurdles.

=== Regrets and detransitions ===
People who undergo gender affirming surgery can develop regret for the procedure later in life, largely predicted by a lack of support from family or peers, with data from the 1990s suggesting a rate of 3.8%. In a 2001 study of 232 MTF patients who underwent GRS, none of the patients reported complete regret and only 6% reported partial or occasional regrets. A 2009 review of Medline literature suggests the total rate of patients expressing feelings of doubt or regret is estimated to be as high as 8%.

A 2010 meta-study, based on 28 previous long-term studies of transsexual men and women, found that the overall psychological functioning of transsexual people after transition was similar to that of the general population and significantly better than that of untreated transsexual people.

== Demographics ==
Estimates of the population of transsexual people are highly dependent on the specific case definitions used in the studies, with prevalence rates varying by orders of magnitude. In the United States, the Diagnostic and Statistical Manual of Mental Disorders (DSM-V 2013) gives the following estimates: "For natal adult males [MTF], prevalence ranges from 0.005% to 0.014%, and for natal females [FTM], from 0.002% to 0.003%." It states, however, that these are likely underestimates since the figures are based on referrals to specialty clinics.

The Amsterdam Gender Dysphoria Clinic over four decades has treated roughly 95% of Dutch transsexual clients, and it suggests (1997) a prevalence of 1:10,000 among assigned males and 1:30,000 among assigned females.

Olyslager and Conway presented a paper at the WPATH 20th International Symposium (2007) arguing that the data from their own and other studies actually imply much higher prevalence, with minimum lower bounds of 1:4,500 male-to-female transsexual people and 1:8,000 female-to-male transsexual people for a number of countries worldwide. They estimate the number of post-op women in the US to be 32,000 and obtain a figure of 1:2500 male-to-female transsexual people. They further compare the annual instances of gender affirming surgery (SRS) and male birth in the U.S. to obtain a figure of 1:1000 MTF transsexual people and suggest a prevalence of 1:500 extrapolated from the rising rates of SRS in the US and a "common sense" estimate of the number of undiagnosed transsexual people. Olyslager and Conway also argue that the US population of assigned males having already undergone reassignment surgery by the top three US SRS surgeons alone is enough to account for the entire transsexual population implied by the 1:10,000 prevalence number, yet this excludes all other US SRS surgeons, surgeons in countries such as Thailand, Canada, and others, and the high proportion of transsexual people who have not yet sought treatment, suggesting that a prevalence of 1:10,000 is too low.

A 2008 study of the number of New Zealand passport holders who changed the sex on their passport estimated that 1:3,639 birth-assigned males and 1:22,714 birth-assigned females were transsexual.

A 2008 presentation at the LGBT Health Summit in Bristol, UK, showed that the prevalence of transsexual people in the UK was increasing (14% per year) and that the mean age of transition was rising.

Though no direct studies on the prevalence of gender identity disorder (GID) have been done, a variety of clinical papers published in the past 20 years provide estimates ranging from 1:7,400 to 1:42,000 in assigned males and 1:30,040 to 1:104,000 in assigned females.

In 2015, the National Center for Transgender Equality conducted a National Transgender Discrimination Survey. Of the 27,715 transgender and genderqueer people who took the survey, 35% identified as "non-binary", 33% identified as transgender women, 29% identified as transgender men, and 3% said that "crossdresser" best described their gender identity.

A 2016 systematic review and meta-analysis of "how various definitions of transgender affect prevalence estimates" in 27 studies found a meta-prevalence (mP) estimates per 100,000 population of 9.2 (95% CI = 4.9–13.6), equal to 1:11,000 for surgical or hormonal gender affirmation therapy and 6.8 (95% CI = 4.6–9.1), equal to 1:15,000 for transgender-related medical condition diagnoses. Of studies assessing self-reported transgender identity, prevalence was 355 (95% CI = 144–566), equal to 1 in 282. However, a single outlier study would have influenced the result to 871 (95% CI = 519–1,224), equal to 1 in 115; this study was removed. "Significant heterogeneity was observed in most analyses."

Those with an autism spectrum disorder or schizophrenia are transsexuals more often than the general population.

Country	Publication	Year	Incidence in males	Incidence in females
US	DSM-IV	1994	1:30,000	1:100,000
Netherlands	The Journal of Clinical Endocrinology & Metabolism	1997	1:10,000	1:30,000
US	International Journal of Transgenderism	2007	1:4,500	1:8,000
New Zealand	Australian and New Zealand Journal of Psychiatry	2008	1:3,639	1:22,714
US	The Journal of Sexual Medicine	2016	1:11,000	1:15,000

== Society and culture ==
A number of Native American and First Nations cultures have traditional social and ceremonial roles for individuals who do not fit into the usual roles for males and females in that culture. These roles can vary widely between tribes, because gender roles, when they exist at all, also vary considerably among different Native cultures. However, a modern, pan-Indian status known as Two-Spirit has emerged among LGBTQ Natives in recent years.

=== Legal and social aspects ===
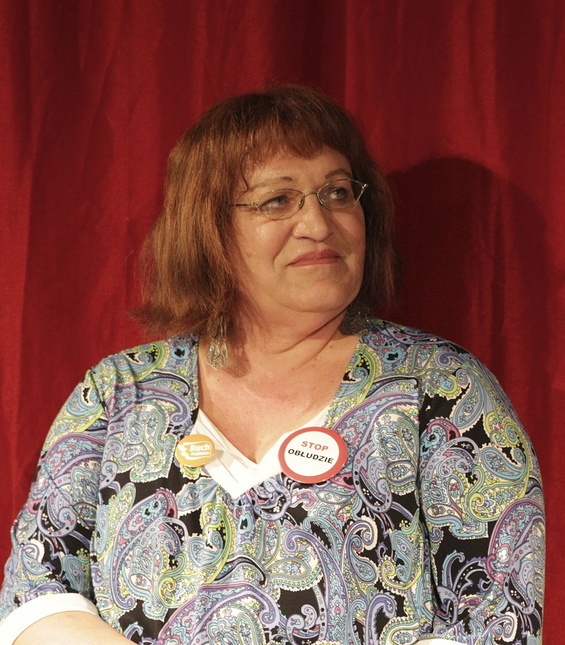
Poland's Anna Grodzka is the first transsexual MP in the history of Europe to have had gender affirming surgery.

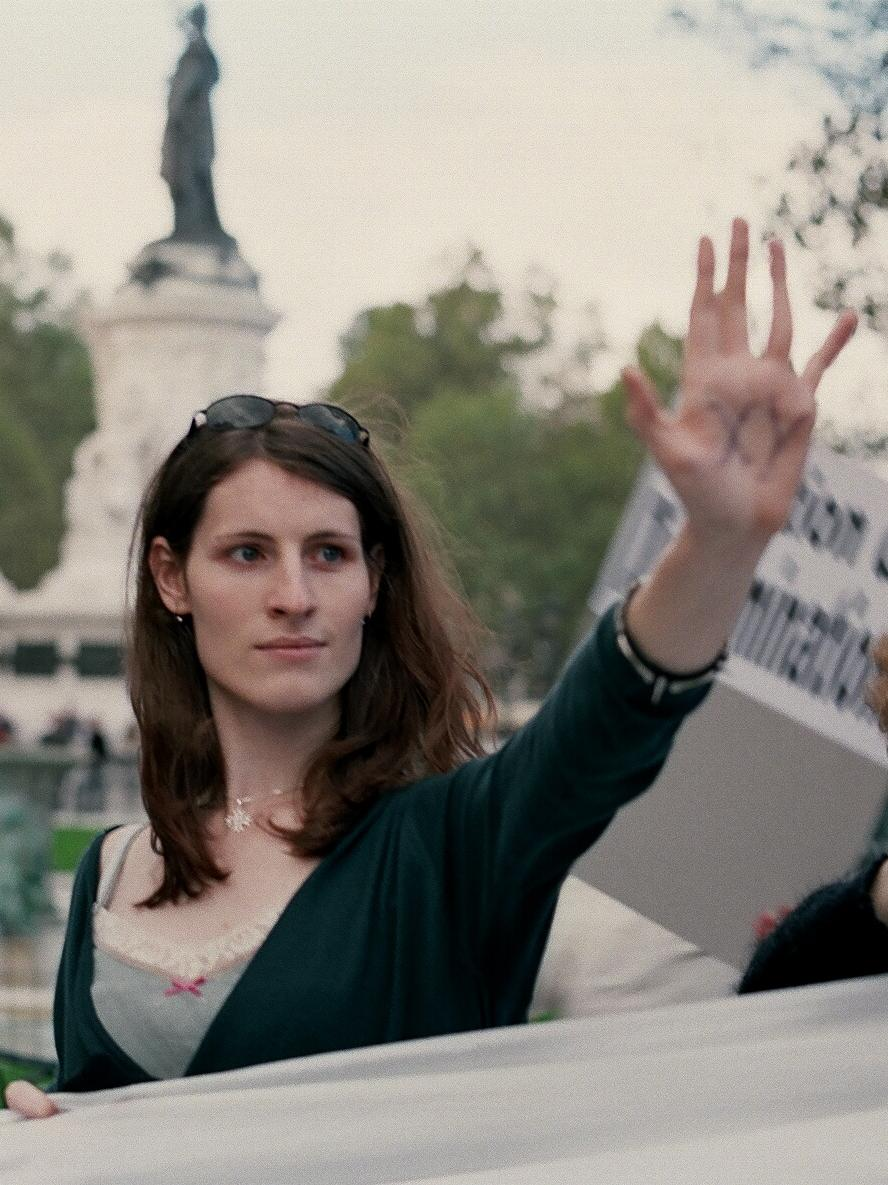
Transsexual woman July Schultz displaying her palm with the letters "XY" written on it at an outdoor demonstration

Laws regarding changes to the legal status of transsexual people are different from country to country. Some jurisdictions allow an individual to change their name, and sometimes, their legal gender, to reflect their gender identity. Within the US, some states allow amendments or complete replacement of the original birth certificates. Some states seal earlier records against all but court orders to protect the transsexual person's privacy.

In many places, it is not possible to change birth records or other legal designations of sex, although changes are occurring. Estelle Asmodelle's book documented her struggle to change the Australian birth certificate and passport laws, although there are other individuals who have been instrumental in changing laws and thus attaining more acceptance for transsexual people in general.

Medical treatment for transsexual and transgender people is available in most Western countries. However, transsexual and transgender people challenge the "normative" gender roles of many cultures and often face considerable hatred and prejudice. The film Boys Don't Cry chronicles the case of Brandon Teena, a transsexual man who was raped and murdered after his status was discovered. In 1999 Brandon was memorialised in the first Transgender Day of Remembrance. The Transgender Day of Remembrance is observed annually on November 20 by members of the transgender community and LGBT+ organisations across the world.

Jurisdictions allowing changes to birth records generally allow trans people to marry members of the opposite sex to their gender identity and to adopt children. Jurisdictions which prohibit same sex marriage often require pre-transition marriages to be ended before they will issue an amended birth certificate.

Health-practitioner manuals, professional journalistic style guides, and LGBT advocacy groups advise the adoption by others of the name and pronouns identified by the person in question, including present references to the transgender or transsexual person's past. Family members and friends who may be confused about pronoun usage or the definitions of sex are commonly instructed in proper pronoun usage, either by the transsexual person or by professionals or other persons familiar with pronoun usage as it relates to transsexual people. Sometimes transsexual people have to correct their friends and family members many times before they begin to use the transsexual person's desired pronouns consistently. According to Julia Serano, deliberate mis-gendering of transsexual people is "an arrogant attempt to belittle and humiliate trans people".

Both "transsexualism" and "gender identity disorders not resulting from physical impairments" are specifically excluded from coverage under the Americans with Disabilities Act Section 12211. Gender dysphoria is not excluded.

==== Employment issues ====
Openly transsexual people can have difficulty maintaining employment. Most find it necessary to remain employed during transition in order to cover the costs of living and transition. However, employment discrimination against trans people is rampant and many of them are fired when they come out or are involuntarily outed at work. Transsexual people must decide whether to transition on-the-job, or to find a new job when they make their social transition. Other stresses that transsexual people face in the workplace are being fearful of coworkers negatively responding to their transition, and losing job experience under a previous name—even deciding which rest room to use can prove challenging. Finding employment can be especially challenging for those in mid-transition.

Laws regarding name and gender changes in many countries make it difficult for transsexual people to conceal their trans status from their employers. Because the Harry Benjamin Standards of Care requires one-year of real life experience prior to SRS, some feel this creates a Catch-22 situation which makes it difficult for trans people to remain employed or obtain SRS.

In many countries, laws provide protection from workplace discrimination based on gender identity or gender expression, including masculine women and feminine men. An increasing number of companies are including "gender identity and expression" in their non-discrimination policies. Often these laws and policies do not cover all situations and are not strictly enforced. California's anti-discrimination laws protect transsexual persons in the workplace and specifically prohibit employers from terminating or refusing to hire a person based on their gender identity. The European Union provides employment protection as part of gender discrimination protections following the European Court of Justice decisions in P v S and Cornwall County Council.

In the United States National Transgender Discrimination Survey, 44% of respondents reported not getting a job they applied for because of being transgender. 36% of trans women reported losing a job due to discrimination compared to 19% of trans men. 54% of trans women and 50% of trans men report having been harassed in the workplace. Transgender people who have been fired due to bias are more than 34 times likely than members of the general population to attempt suicide.

=== Stealth ===
Many transsexual men and women choose to live completely as members of their gender without disclosing details of their birth-assigned sex. This approach is sometimes called stealth. Stealth transsexuals choose not to disclose their past for numerous reasons, including fear of discrimination and fear of physical violence. There are examples of people having been denied medical treatment upon discovery of their trans status, whether it was revealed by the patient or inadvertently discovered by the doctors.

=== In the media ===
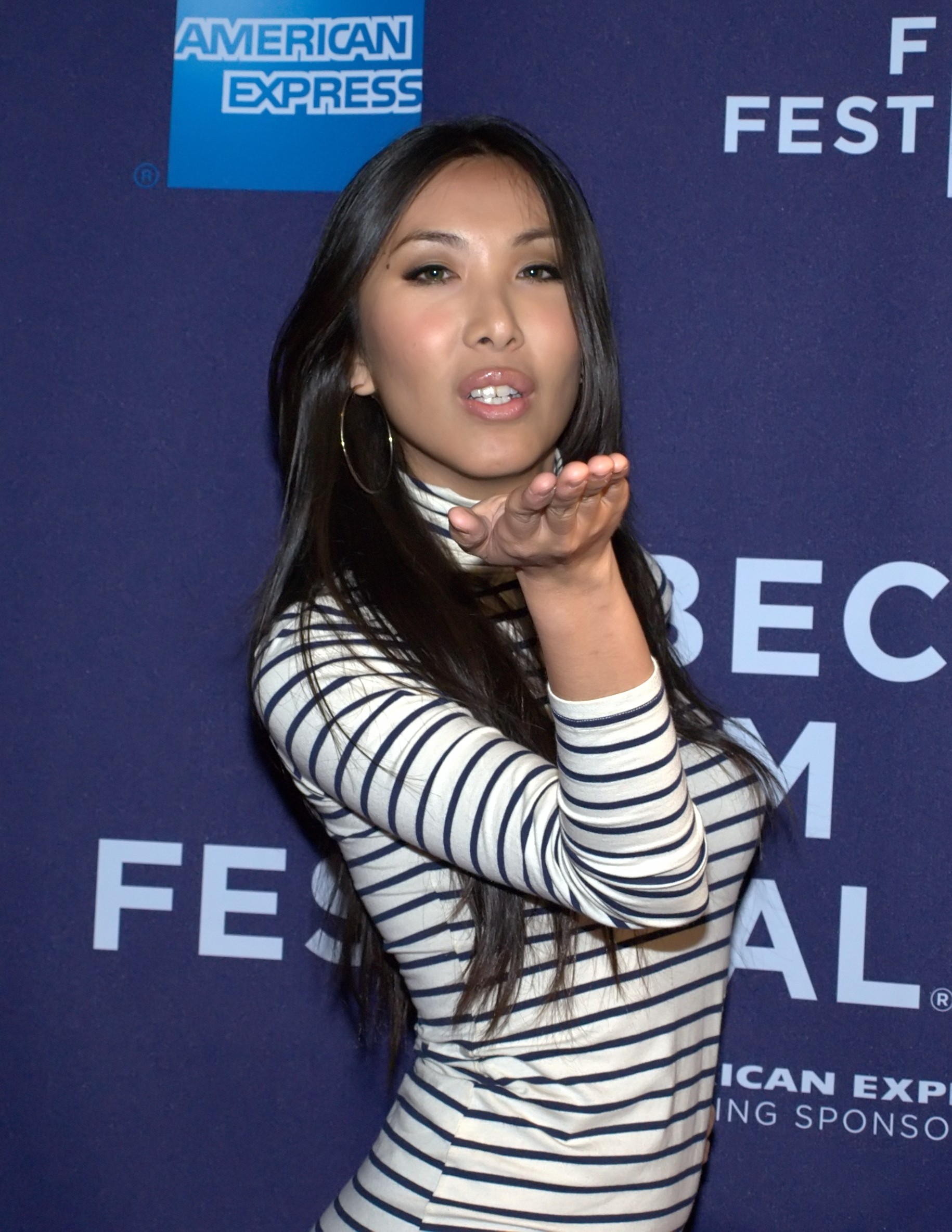
Nina Poon, a transsexual model who has appeared in Kenneth Cole ads, at the 2010 Tribeca Film Festival

Before transsexual people were depicted in popular movies and television shows, Aleshia Brevard—a transsexual woman whose surgery took place in 1962—was actively working as an actress and model in Hollywood and New York throughout the 1960s and 1970s. Aleshia never portrayed a transsexual person, though she appeared in eight Hollywood-produced films, on most of the popular variety shows of the day, including The Dean Martin Show, and was a regular on The Red Skelton Show and One Life to Live before returning to university to teach drama and acting.

=== In pageantry ===
Since 2004, with the goal of crowning the top transsexual of the world, a beauty pageant by the name of The World's Most Beautiful Transsexual Contest was held in Las Vegas, Nevada. The pageant accepted pre-operation and post-operation trans women, but required proof of their gender at birth. The winner of the 2004 pageant was a woman named Mimi Marks.

Jenna Talackova, a 23-year-old woman, successfully challenged Donald Trump and the Miss Universe Canada pageant, leading to the removal of the ban on transgender contestants. She participated in the pageant held in Toronto on May 19, 2012. On January 12, 2013, Kylan Arianna Wenzel was the first transgender woman allowed to compete in a Miss Universe Organization pageant since Donald Trump changed the rules to allow women like Wenzel to enter officially. Wenzel was the first transgender woman to compete in a Miss Universe Organization pageant since officials disqualified 23-year-old Miss Canada Jenna Talackova the previous year after learning she was transgender.

== See also ==
- List of transgender-related topics
- List of transgender-rights organizations
- List of LGBT-related organizations
- List of transgender people

== Bibliography ==
- Benjamin, Harry (1966). The Transsexual Phenomenon. Julian Press, Incorporated Publishers. OCLC 1138665289.
- Brown, Mildred L.; Chloe Ann Rounsley (1996). True Selves: Understanding Transsexualism – For Families, Friends, Coworkers, and Helping Professionals. Jossey-Bass. ISBN 978-0-7879-6702-4. OCLC 51437864.
- Feinberg, Leslie (1999). Trans Liberation: Beyond Pink or Blue. Beacon Press. ISBN 978-0-8070-7951-5. OCLC 38732343.
- Standards of Care for the Health of Transsexual, Transgender, and Gender-Nonconforming People (PDF) (Report). 7. World Professional Association for Transgender Health. 2012. Archived (PDF) from the original on 11 May 2022.
- Kruijver, Frank P. M.; Zhou, Jiang-Ning; Pool, Chris W.; Hofman, Michel A.; Gooren, Louis J. G.; Swaab, Dick F. (1 May 2000). "Male-to-Female Transsexuals Have Female Neuron Numbers in a Limbic Nucleus". The Journal of Clinical Endocrinology and Metabolism. 85 (5). The Endocrine Society: 2034–41. doi:10.1210/jcem.85.5.6564. ISSN 0021-972X. PMID 10843193. Archived from the original on 6 February 2007.
- Rathus, Spencer A.; Jeffery S. Nevid, Lois Fichner-Rathus (2002). Human Sexuality in a World of Diversity. Allyn & Bacon. ISBN 978-0-205-40615-9. OCLC 55502508.
- Schreiber, Gerhard (2016). Transsexuality in Theology and Neuroscience. Findings, Controversies, and Perspectives (in German). Walter de Gruyter. ISBN 978-3-11-044080-5. OCLC 962412457.
- Pepper, Shanti M.; Lorah, Peggy (2008). "Career Issues and Workplace Considerations for the Transsexual Community: Bridging a Gap of Knowledge for Career Counselors and Mental Health Care Providers". The Career Development Quarterly. 56 (4). Wiley: 330–343. doi:10.1002/j.2161-0045.2008.tb00098.x. ISSN 0889-4019. ProQuest 219546491.
