= Harry Benjamin =

German-American endocrinologist and sexologist (1885–1986)

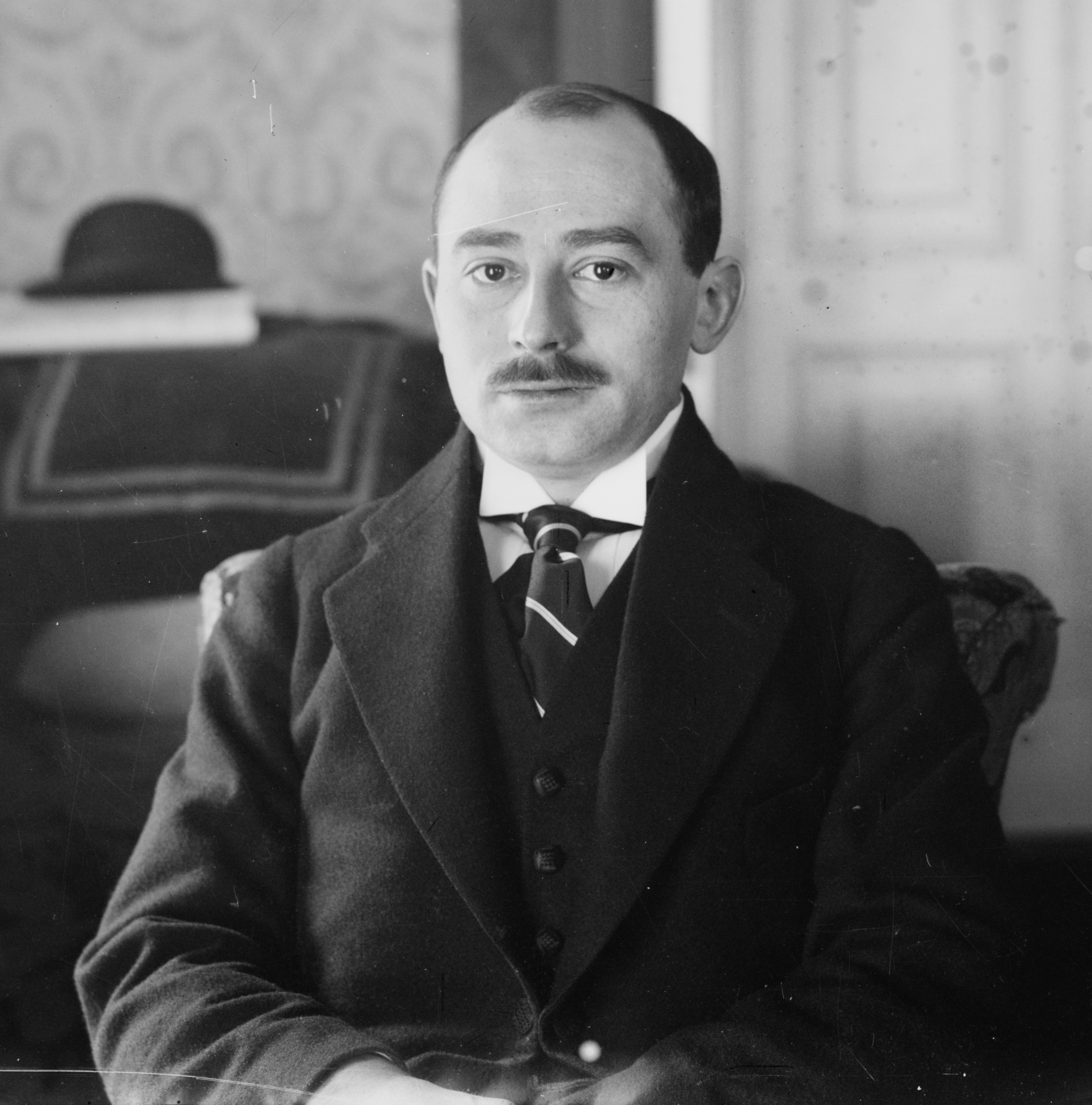
- Benjamin in 1913
- Born: January 12, 1885; Berlin, German Empire
- Died: August 24, 1986 (aged 101); New York City, U.S.
- Known for: Pioneering gender-affirming care
- Spouse: Gretchen Benjamin
- Medical career
- Field: Endocrinology, sexology
- Notable works: The Transsexual Phenomenon (1966)

Harry Benjamin (January 12, 1885 – August 24, 1986) was a German-American endocrinologist and sexologist, widely known for his clinical work with transgender people.

== Early life and career ==
Benjamin was born in Berlin, and raised in a German Lutheran home. His mother was German and his father at least part-Jewish in ancestry. He joined a regiment of the Prussian Guard. He received his doctorate in medicine in 1912 in Tübingen for a dissertation on tuberculosis. Sexual medicine interested him, but was not part of his medical studies. In a 1985 interview he recalled:

I do remember going, as a young person, to a lecture by Auguste Forel, whose book The Sexual Question was a sensation at the time and which impressed me greatly. I also met Magnus Hirschfeld very early on through a girl friend, who knew the police official Kopp, who was in charge investigating of sexual offenses. He, in turn, was a friend of Hirschfeld's, and so I met both men. That was around 1907. They repeatedly took me along on their rounds through the homosexual bars in Berlin. I especially remember the 'Eldorado' with its drag shows, where also many of the customers appeared in the clothing of the other sex. The word "transvestite" had not yet been invented. Hirschfeld coined it only in 1910 in his well-known study.

Benjamin visited the United States in 1913, to work with a quack doctor who claimed to have found a cure for tuberculosis. The liner in which Benjamin was returning to Germany was caught mid-Atlantic both by the outbreak of the First World War in 1914, and the Royal Navy. Given the choice of a British internment camp, as an "enemy alien", or returning to New York, he used his last dollars to travel back to America, where he made his home for the rest of his life. However, he maintained and built many international professional connections and visited Europe frequently when wars allowed.

After several failed attempts to start a medical career in New York, in 1915 Benjamin rented a consulting room, in which he also slept, and started his own general medical practice. In 1937 he moved his practice to a ground floor office suite at 728 Park Avenue in Manhattan, then briefly to 125 East 72nd Street in 1957, and sometime between 1959 and 1962 he moved his practice again to 44 East 67th Street before finally relocating to 1045 Park Avenue in 1963 where he continued to practice until his retirement in 1968. Sometime before 1948, he also began maintaining an office in San Francisco where he practiced during the summer of every year (at 450 Sutter Street, Suite 2232), with many of his patients coming from the nearby Tenderloin neighborhood).

== Work with transgender people ==
Prior to arriving in the United States, Benjamin studied at the Institut für Sexualwissenschaft; from about this time onward he began to encounter and treat patients who he would later describe as transsexuals. In the 1930s he studied in Austria with Eugen Steinach. In 1948, in San Francisco, Benjamin was asked by Alfred Kinsey, a fellow sexologist, to see a young patient who was anatomically male but insisted on being female. Kinsey had encountered the child as a result of his interviews for Sexual Behavior in the Human Male, which was published that year. This case rapidly caused Benjamin's interest in what he would come to call transsexualism, realizing that there was a different condition to that of transvestism, under which adults who had such needs had been classified to that time.

Despite the psychiatrists Benjamin involved in the case not agreeing on a path of treatment, Benjamin eventually decided to treat the child with estrogen (Premarin, introduced in 1941), which had a "calming effect", and helped arrange for the mother and child to go to Germany, where surgery to assist the child could be performed but, from there, they ceased to maintain contact, to Benjamin's regret. However, Benjamin continued to refine his understanding and went on to treat several hundred patients with similar needs in a similar manner, often without accepting any payment.

Many of his patients were referred by David Cauldwell, Robert Stoller, and doctors in Denmark. These doctors received hundreds of requests from individuals who had read about their work connected with changing sex, as it was then largely described.

However, due to the personal political opinions of the American doctors and a Danish law prohibiting sex reassignment surgery on noncitizens, these doctors referred the letter-writers to the one doctor of the era who would aid transsexual individuals, Harry Benjamin. Benjamin conducted treatment with the assistance of carefully selected colleagues of various disciplines (such as psychiatrists C. L. Ihlenfeld and John Alden, electrologist Martha Foss, and surgeons Jose Jesus Barbosa, Roberto C. Granato, and Georges Burou).

Benjamin's patients regarded him as a man of immense caring, respect and kindness, and many kept in touch with him until his death. He was a prolific and assiduous correspondent, in both English and German, and many letters are archived at the Magnus Hirschfeld Archive for Sexology, Humboldt University, Berlin.

The legal, social and medical background to Benjamin's care in the United States, as in many other countries, was often a stark contrast. Wearing items of clothing associated with the opposite sex in public was often illegal; anything seen as homosexuality was often persecuted or illegal. No nation-wide standards of care existed in for transgender individuals in the 1940s and 1950s, and many doctors at the time believed all such people (including children) should be denied any affirmation of their gender identity, or should be involuntarily subjected to "curative" treatments. Such treatments could be psychological in nature, such as "aversion therapy" via drugged detention or electroconvulsive therapy, or could be physical in nature, such as lobotomization.

Though he had already published papers and lectured to professional audiences extensively, Benjamin's 1966 book, The Transsexual Phenomenon, was especially important as the first large work describing and explaining the affirmative treatment path he pioneered. Publicity surrounding his patient Christine Jorgensen brought the issue into the mainstream in 1952 and led to a great many people presenting for assistance, internationally. In the preface of Christine Jorgensen's autobiography, Dr. Benjamin also gives Jorgensen credit for the advancement of his studies. He wrote, "Indeed Christine, without you, probably none of this would have happened; the grant, my publications, lectures, etc."

Similar cases in other countries (such as that of Roberta Cowell, whose surgery by Harold Gillies in England was in 1951 but was not publicised until 1954; Coccinelle who received much publicity in France in 1958, and April Ashley, whose exposure in 1961 by the British tabloid press was reported worldwide) fuelled this. But most of Benjamin's patients lived (and many still live) quiet lives.

Reed Erickson (1917–1992), a successful industrialist, sought treatment from Benjamin in 1963. Erickson was the founder and funder of the Erickson Educational Foundation, which published educational booklets, funded medical conferences, counselling services, and the establishment of gender clinics. The EEF funded the Harry Benjamin Foundation.

== Other work and interests ==
Apart from endocrinology and sexology, he worked on life extension and now would be described as a gerontologist. Benjamin lived to be 101.

Benjamin dedicated his 1966 major work to Gretchen. They were married for 60 years. They were married December 23, 1925. Gretchen revealed to Charles L. Ihlenfeld that "about six months after they were married Harry brought his mother from Germany to live with them" and that "from then on their bedroom door remained open".

In 1979, the Harry Benjamin International Gender Dysphoria Association was formed, using Benjamin's name by permission. The group consists of therapists and psychologists who devised a set of Standards of Care (SOC) for the treatment of gender dysphoria, largely based on Benjamin's cases, and studies. It later changed its name to The World Professional Association for Transgender Health (WPATH).

== Bibliography ==
- The Sex Problem and the Armed Forces (1944) ASIN: B0056ASJFW
- Benjamin, H (1946). "A contribution to the endocrine aspect of the impotence problem; a report of thirty-nine cases". Urol Cutaneous Rev. 50: 139–43. PMID 21020395.
- Benjamin, H (July 1946). "Endocrinology in the aged". Interne. 12: 465–9. PMID 20991360.
- Benjamin, H (July 1947). "Biologic versus chronologic age". J Gerontol. 2 (3): 217–27. doi:10.1093/geronj/2.3.217. PMID 20264999.
- Benjamin, H (July 1949). "Endocrine gerontotherapy; the use of sex hormone combinations in female patients". J Gerontol. 4 (3): 222–33. doi:10.1093/geronj/4.3.222. PMID 18147194.
- Benjamin, H (July 1949). "Two years of sexology". Am J Psychother. 3 (3): 419–27. doi:10.1176/appi.psychotherapy.1949.3.3.419. PMID 18147407.
- Benjamin, H (August 1949). "Outline of a method to estimate the biological age with special reference to the role of the sexual functions". Int J Sexol. 3 (1): 34–7. PMID 18133520.
- Benjamin, H (1950). "Endocrine gerontotherapy. The use of steroid hormone combinations in male patients". J Insur Med. 6 (1): 12–7. PMID 14803776.
- Benjamin, H (April 1954). "Transsexualism and transvestism as psychosomatic and somatopsychic syndromes". Am J Psychother. 8 (2): 219–30. doi:10.1176/appi.psychotherapy.1954.8.2.219. PMID 13148376.
- Benjamin, H (1964). "Nature and management of transsexualism, with a report on thirty-one operated cases". West J Surg Obstet Gynecol. 72: 105–11. PMID 14128591.
- Benjamin, H (July 1964). "Clinical aspects of transsexualism in the male and female". Am J Psychother. 18 (3): 458–69. doi:10.1176/appi.psychotherapy.1964.18.3.458. PMID 14173773.
- Benjamin, H (November 1964). "Transsexualism, ITS Nature and Therapy". Nervenarzt. 35: 499–500. PMID 14320022.
- Introduction to Prostitution and Morality: a Definitive Report on the Prostitute in Contemporary Society and an Analysis of the Causes and Effects of the Suppression (Robert E.L. Masters, 1964) ASIN: B000WG6JF2
- Introduction to Forbidden Sexual Behavior and Morality: An Objective Re-Examination of Perverse Sex Practices in Different Cultures (Robert E.L. Masters, 1964) ISBN 978-1-258-02436-9
- Benjamin, H (July 1966). "[Sexual problems at the consultation hour of the general practitioner]". Landarzt. 42 (20): 885–90. PMID 5926775.
- The Transsexual Phenomenon; a Scientific Report on Transsexualism and Sex Conversion in the Human Male and Female, (1966) ASIN: B0007HXA76
- Introduction to Christine Jorgensen; Personal Autobiography (Christine Jorgenssen, 1967) ISBN 978-0-8397-1640-2
- Benjamin, H (February 1967). "The transsexual phenomenon". Trans N Y Acad Sci. 29 (4 Series II): 428–30. doi:10.1111/j.2164-0947.1967.tb02273.x. PMID 5233741.
- Benjamin, H (January 1971). "Should surgery be performed on transsexuals?". Am J Psychother. 25 (1): 74–82. doi:10.1176/appi.psychotherapy.1971.25.1.74. PMID 5539832.
- Benjamin, H; Ihlenfeld, CL (March 1973). "Transsexualism". Am J Nurs. 73 (3): 457–61. doi:10.2307/3422704. JSTOR 3422704. PMID 4486125. S2CID 263676562.

== See also ==
- Benjamin scale
- List of transgender-related topics
- Eugen Steinach
- Second Serve
