= Antholagnia =

Sexual attraction to flowers

American lotus flower plant, Nelumbo lutea. Since the 20th century, white flowers have been especially associated with antholagnia.

Antholagnia is a paraphilia involving sexual attraction to flowers, the reproductive structure in plants. Those with antholagnia generally become sexually aroused by the scent of botany.

Culturally, the reproductive structures of plants are associated with romance, and are sometimes further associated with erotica, aphrodisiacs, sex organs, and metaphors for gender and sexuality.

Historically, women have been more often noted to experience sexual excitement as a result of the olfactory (rather than visual) part of this paraphilia.

== History ==
Dating back to the 3rd century BCE, the biblical Song of Songs uses flowers to "suggest sexual awareness". The erotic poem introduces its protagonist with the opening lines, "I am the rose of Sharon, the wild lily of the valleys." In Francis Landry's Paradoxes of Paradise, he describes a lily as a solitary and fragile flower whose funnel-shaped appearance "has female sexual connotations." Throughout the poem's sexual encounters, the protagonists describe each other using almost exclusively botanical terms, such as the woman's line: "His lips are lilies, distilling liquid myrrh."

While describing the ideal Padmini, or Lotus-woman, the 16th century Ananga Ranga describes the ideal Padmini or Lotus-woman's vulva and vaginal secretions using sexualized floral contexts: "Her Yoni resembles the open lotus-bud, and her Love-seed (Kama-salila, the water of life) is perfumed like the lily which has newly burst."

The first Valentine's Day card in 1667 (as documented by English Samuel Pepys) also included what would become a romantic cliché: "The rose is red, the violet's blue; The honey's sweet and so are you." In 17th century Italy, crystalled parma violet flowers were a popular aphrodisiac, thus culturally associating the cultivar with sexual success.

In his 1799 Fisiologia Dell'Amore (transl. The Physiology of Love), Paolo Mantegazza emphasizes flowers as a common sexual theme, especially during his description of overwhelming olfactory sexual excitement upon smelling flowers.

In British physician Havelock Ellis's 1905 Studies in the Psychology of Sex, he echoes Mantegazza's sentiment in describing the full-body erogenous sensation of smelling flowers and the sexual excitement it causes in some people. Ellis describes certain flowers that create human sexual arousal, such as the Chenopodium vulvaria and the Catogeus oxycantha, whose smells recall those of human sexual organs and pheromones. Eliis notes that, from his data, "it is usually white flowers with heavy, penetrating odors which exert this influence". As a brief case study, he describes one woman who "finds that a number of flowers produce on her a definite sexual effect, with moistening of the pudenda." He quotes a different woman from India, who shares the arousal towards white flowers but describes the complexity of her paraphilia:

A scent to cause me sexual excitement must be somewhat heavy and penetrating. Nearly all white flowers so affect me and many Indian flowers with heavy, almost pungent scents. (All the flower scents are quite unconnected with me with any individual). Tuberose, lilies of the valley, and frangipani flowers have an almost intoxicating effect on me. Violets, roses, mignonette, and many others, though very delicious, give me no sexual feeling at all.

Ellis also warns; "in some constitutions [the use of scents] cannot be indulged without some danger to the morals, by the excitement to the ovaria which results".

In 1919, photographer Alfred Stieglitz (who would later become O'Keefe's husband) put forward the notion that Georgia O'Keefe's floral paintings were sexualized imagery of female genitalia. O'Keefe, however, has denied these sexual associations for decades.

The cliché of placing flower petals atop a bed as a sexual overture has been recorded at least since 1960.

== See also ==
- List of paraphilias
- Dendrophilia, a sexual attraction to trees
