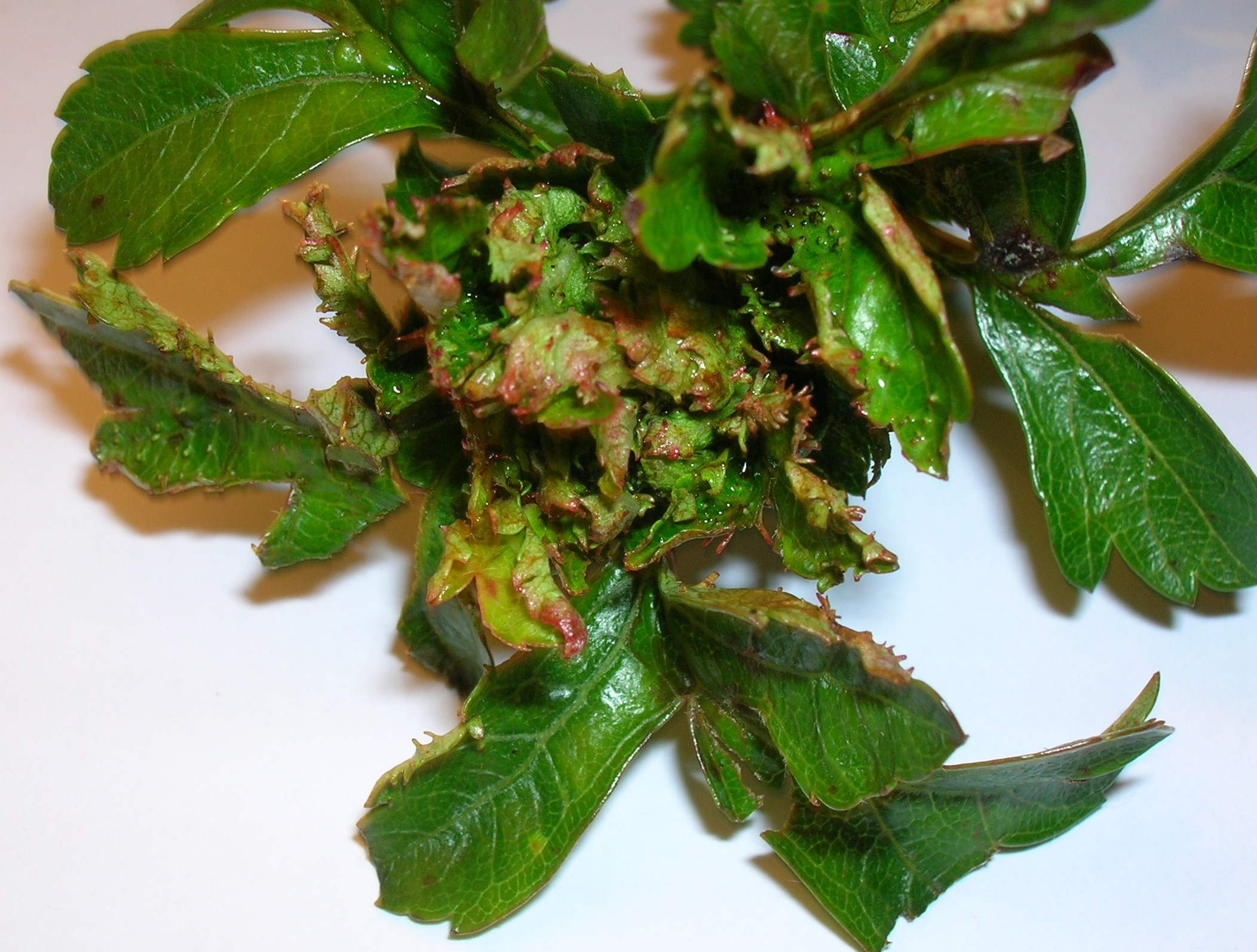
- Button-top gall on Hawthorn

Scientific classification
- Kingdom: Animalia
- Phylum: Arthropoda
- Class: Insecta
- Order: Diptera
- Family: Cecidomyiidae
- Genus: Dasineura
- Species: D. crataegi

Binomial name
- Dasineura crataegi (Winnertz, 1853)

= Dasineura crataegi =

Species of fly

Dasineura crataegi, the hawthorn button-top gall-midge, is a dipteran gall-midge. It causes the hawthorn button-top gall, which develops in the terminal shoots of common hawthorn, Crataegus monogyna Jacq., Midland hawthorn C laevigata (Poir.) DC and their hybrid, C × media Bechst. Synonyms are Perrisia crataegi and Cecidomyia crataegi (Winnertz, 1853).

== Appearance of the gall ==
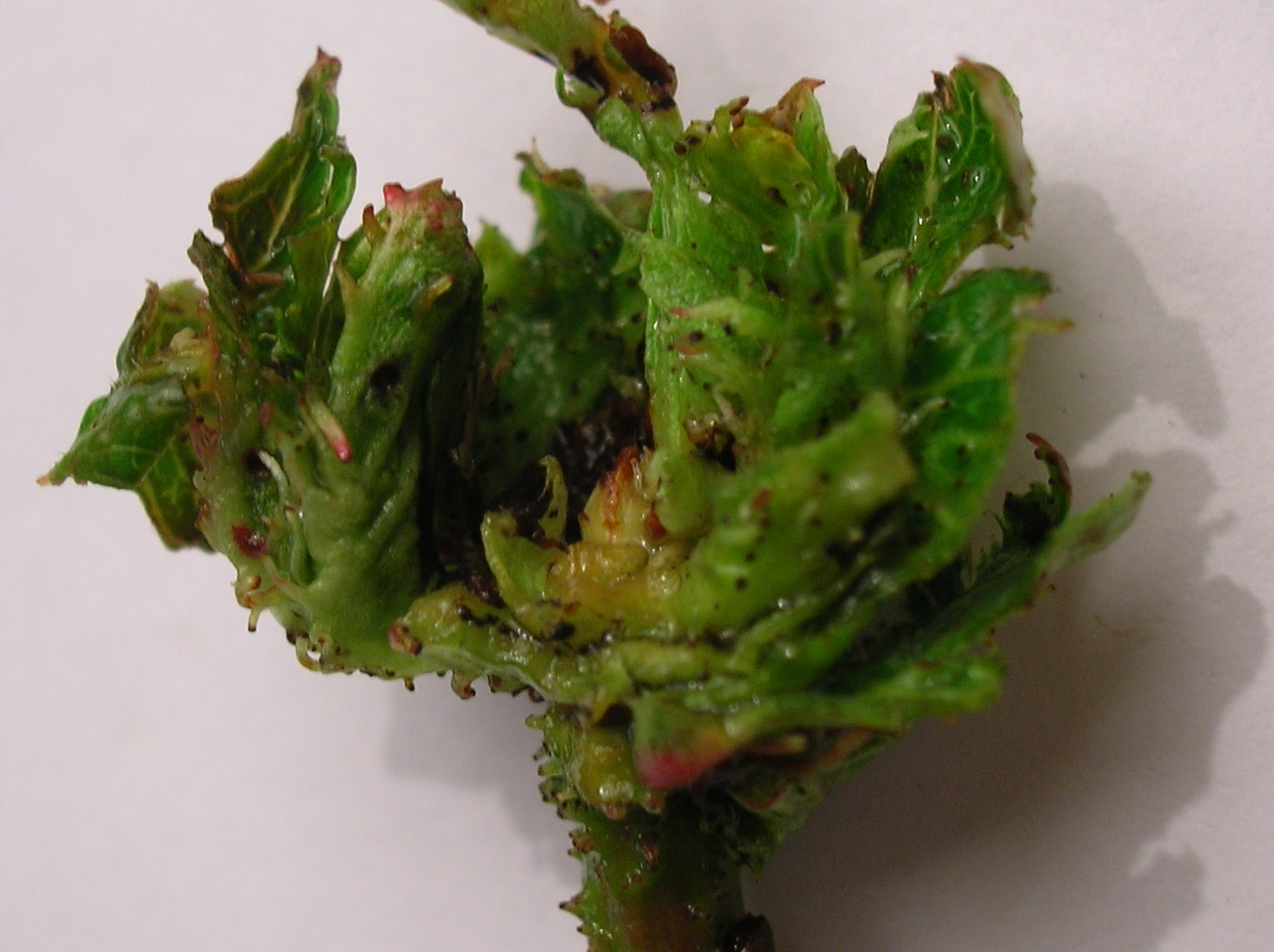
Dissected terminal bud showing ligulate excresences.

The midge induces stunted and distorted rosettes in the host by inhibiting the elongation of the shoot; the rosette is formed from many (8 to 40 or more) slightly thickened and deformed leaves with reduced petioles. Many of the leaves have small green or red ligulate excrescences or projections. The midge larvae are of an orange-red colour.

The gall is occasionally found on isolated plants, but infestation is more commonly in hedges, with the new growth resulting from hedge cutting being the site of high density populations. The rosettes stand out prominently against the sky. Old galls persist and new shoots grow from unaffected buds lying well behind the terminal bud.

== Life-cycle ==
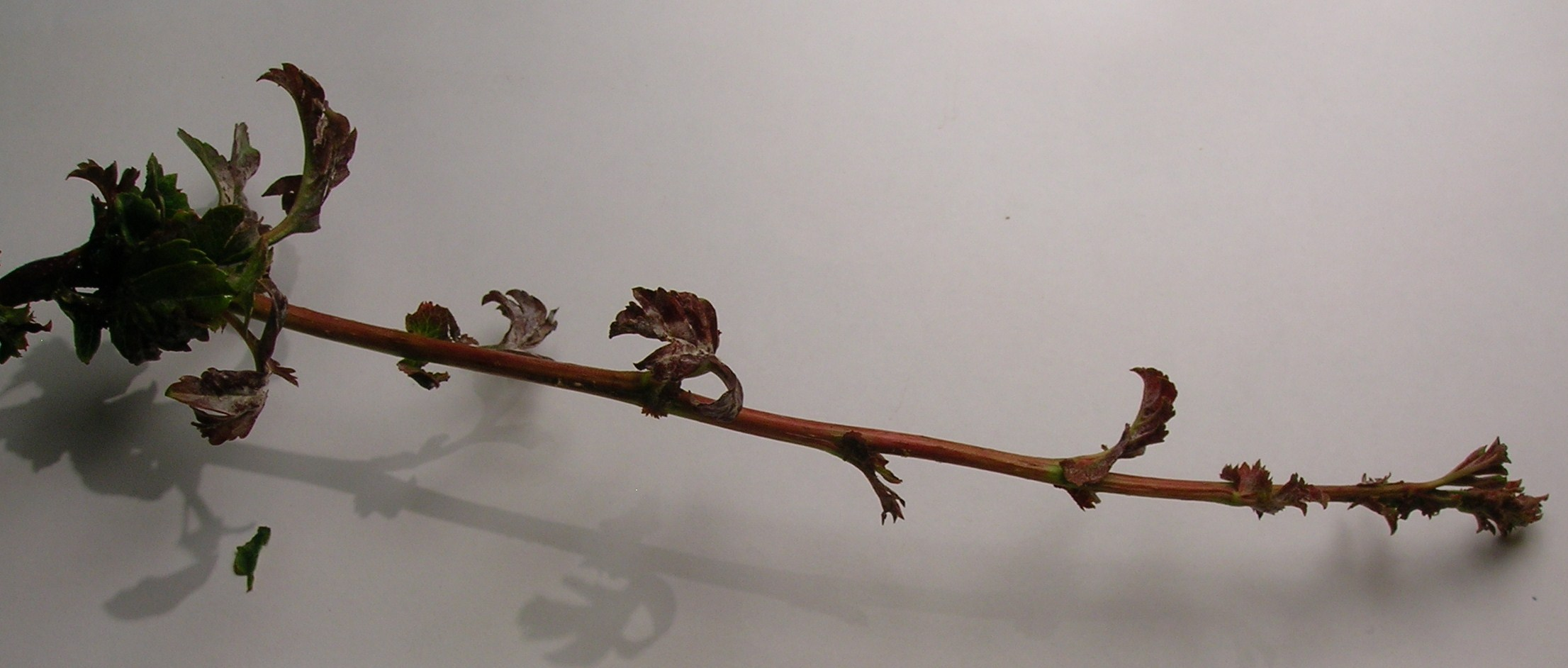
Rosette gall with normal growth arising from a side bud.

Adults emerge from pupae in the ground beneath the shrub and the terminal bud infestations start in March or April; the fully grown larvae fall to the ground in September or October to undergo pupation after feeding and sheltering within the leaf rosette for some time.

== Distribution and control ==
The hawthorn button-top gall midge shows a scattered distribution throughout England, however it is an under recorded species. The gall can be controlled by spraying with insecticide at the larval stage.

== Parasitoids ==
Aprostocetus lysippe is a hymenopteran insect of the family Eulophidae and a parasitoid of D. crataegi.

== See also ==
- Dasineura urticae
