= Dendrophile =

Dendrophile may refer to:

- A person who loves trees, as in Dendrophilia (paraphilia)
- Dendrophile (album), a 2011 recording by Justin Vivian Bond
