= Dendrophilia =

Dendrophilia may refer to one of the following:

- Dendrophilia ramea, a type of coral
- Boiga dendrophilia, or Mangrove Snake
- Dendrophilia (moth), a moth
- Dendrophilia (paraphilia), arousal caused by trees
