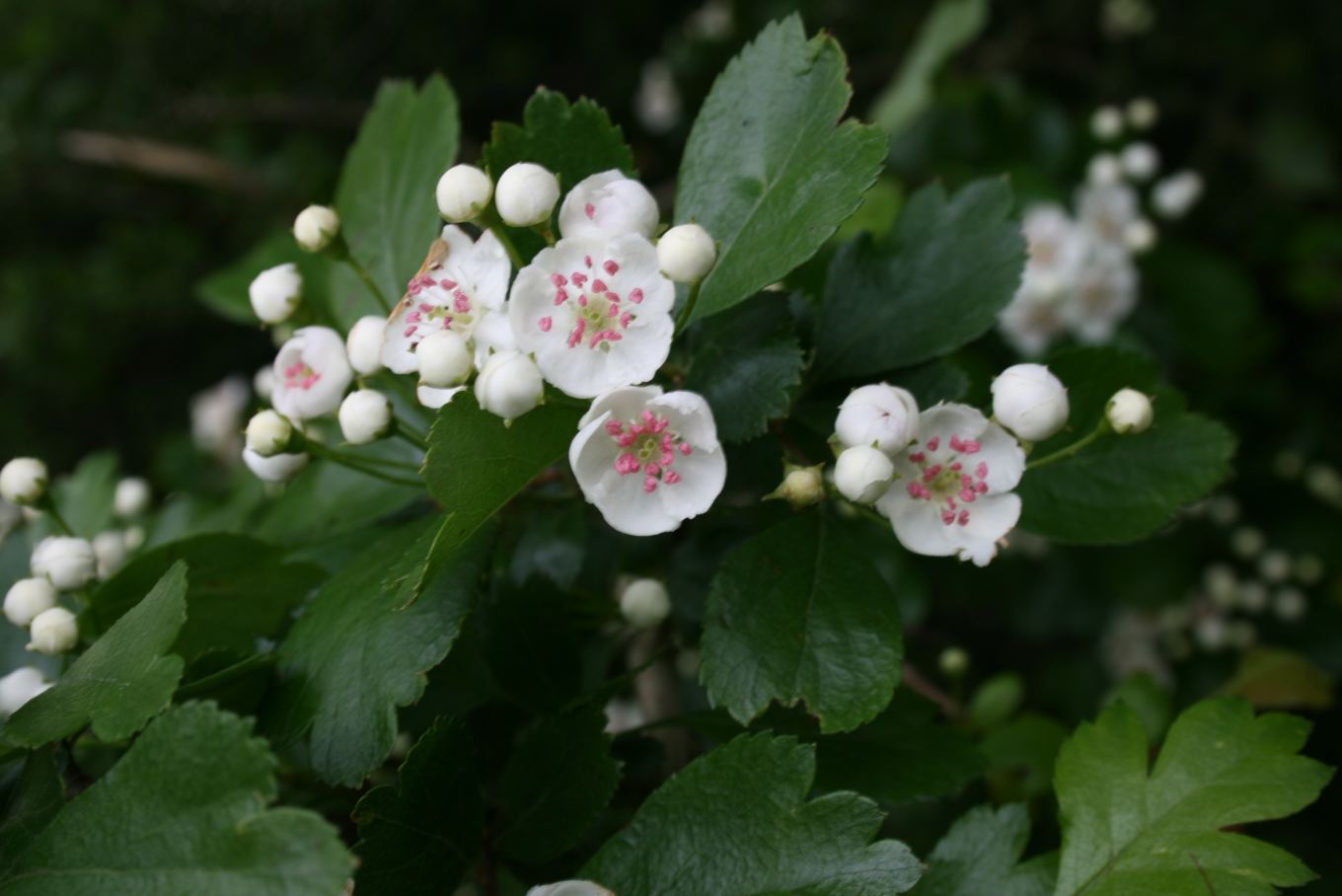

Conservation status
- Least Concern (IUCN 3.1)

Scientific classification
- Kingdom: Plantae
- Clade: Tracheophytes
- Clade: Angiosperms
- Clade: Eudicots
- Clade: Rosids
- Order: Rosales
- Family: Rosaceae
- Genus: Crataegus
- Section: Crataegus sect. Crataegus
- Series: Crataegus ser. Crataegus
- Species: C. laevigata

Binomial name
- Crataegus laevigata (Poir.) DC.
- Distribution map

Synonyms
- C. oxyacanthoides Thuil.; Mespilus laevigata Poir.

= Crataegus laevigata =

Midland hawthorn

Species of plant

Crataegus laevigata, known as the Midland hawthorn, English hawthorn, woodland hawthorn, or mayflower, is a species of hawthorn native to western and central Europe, from Great Britain (where it is typically found in ancient woodland and old hedgerows) and Spain, east to Romania and Ukraine. The species name is sometimes spelt C. levigata, but the original orthography is C. lævigata.

== Description ==
It is a large shrub or small tree growing to 8 m (26 ft) or rarely to 12 m (39 ft) tall, with a dense crown. The leaves are 2–6 cm (0.79–2.4 in) long and 2–5 cm (0.79–2.0 in) broad, with two or three shallow, forward-pointing lobes on each side of the leaf. The hermaphrodite flowers are produced in corymbs of 6 to 12, each flower with five white or pale pink petals and two or sometimes three styles. They are pollinated by insects. The fruit is a dark red pome 6–10 mm (0.2–0.4 in) diameter, slightly broader than long, containing two or three nutlets.

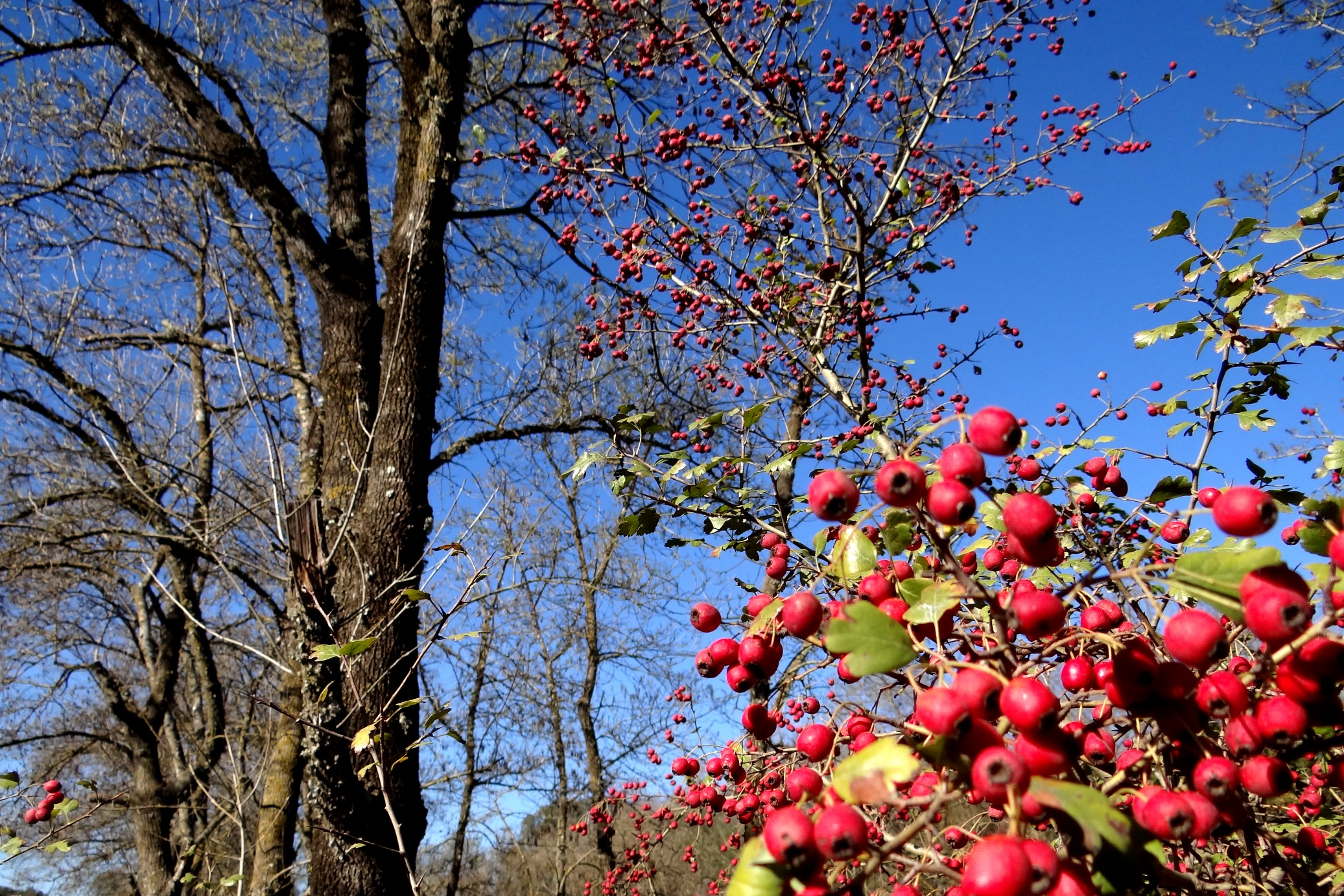
Crataegus laevigata (fruits)

It flowers in May to June (UK) in rather lax clusters. The flowers are usually white, but can be pink. Flowers are up to 2.4 cm in diameter, with 2–3 styles and stigmas and more than 20 stamens. They have 5 triangular sepals, which are obtuse. The petals can be slightly velvety on the inside.

Its fruit persists for an average of 64.4 days, and bears an average of 2.8 seeds per fruit. Fruits average 77.4% water, and their dry weight includes 11.1% carbohydrates and 1.4% lipids.

The Midland hawthorn is distinguished from the closely related common hawthorn, C. monogyna, in the leaves being only shallowly lobed, with forward-pointing lobes, without hair tufts in the vein axils, and in the flowers having more than one style. Each style produces a seed, so its fruits also have more than one seed and these make them slightly oval, in contrast with the single-seeded and therefore round fruits of common hawthorn. The two species hybridise, giving rise to C. × media.

== Taxonomy ==
In the past, Midland hawthorn was widely but incorrectly known by the name C. oxyacantha, a name that has now been rejected as being of uncertain application. In 1753, Linnaeus introduced the name C. oxyacantha for the single species of which he was aware, but described it in such a way that the name became used for various species, including both the Midland and the common hawthorn. In 1775, Jacquin formally separated the common hawthorn, naming it C. monogyna, and in 1946, Dandy showed that Linnaeus had actually observed a different plant, C. oxyacantha. By this time, though, confusion over the true identity of C. oxyacantha was so great that Byatt proposed that the name should be formally rejected as ambiguous, and this proposal was accepted by the International Botanical Congress, although the name continues to be used informally.

The Midland hawthorn was described botanically as a separate species as long ago as 1798 by Poiret, whose name Mespilus laevigata referred to this hawthorn. Poiret's name is reflected in the revised formal botanical name of Midland hawthorn: Crataegus laevigata (Poir.) DC.

== Cultivars ==
'François Rigaud' has yellow fruit.

'Paul's Scarlet' (double red flowers), 'Punicea' (pink and white) and 'Rosea Flore Pleno' (double pink flowers) have gained the Royal Horticultural Society's Award of Garden Merit. These cultivars are considered by taxonomists to be derived from hybrids between C. laevigata and C. monogyna, within the named hybrid species C. × media.

== Parasites ==
The hawthorn button-top gall on Midland hawthorn is caused by the dipteran gall-midge Dasineura crataegi.

== Bibliography ==
- Ehrlén, Johan; Eriksson, Ove (1991). "Phenological variation in fruit characteristics in vertebrate-dispersed plants". Oecologia. 86 (4): 463–470. doi:10.1007/BF00318311. ISSN 0029-8549. PMID 28313326.
