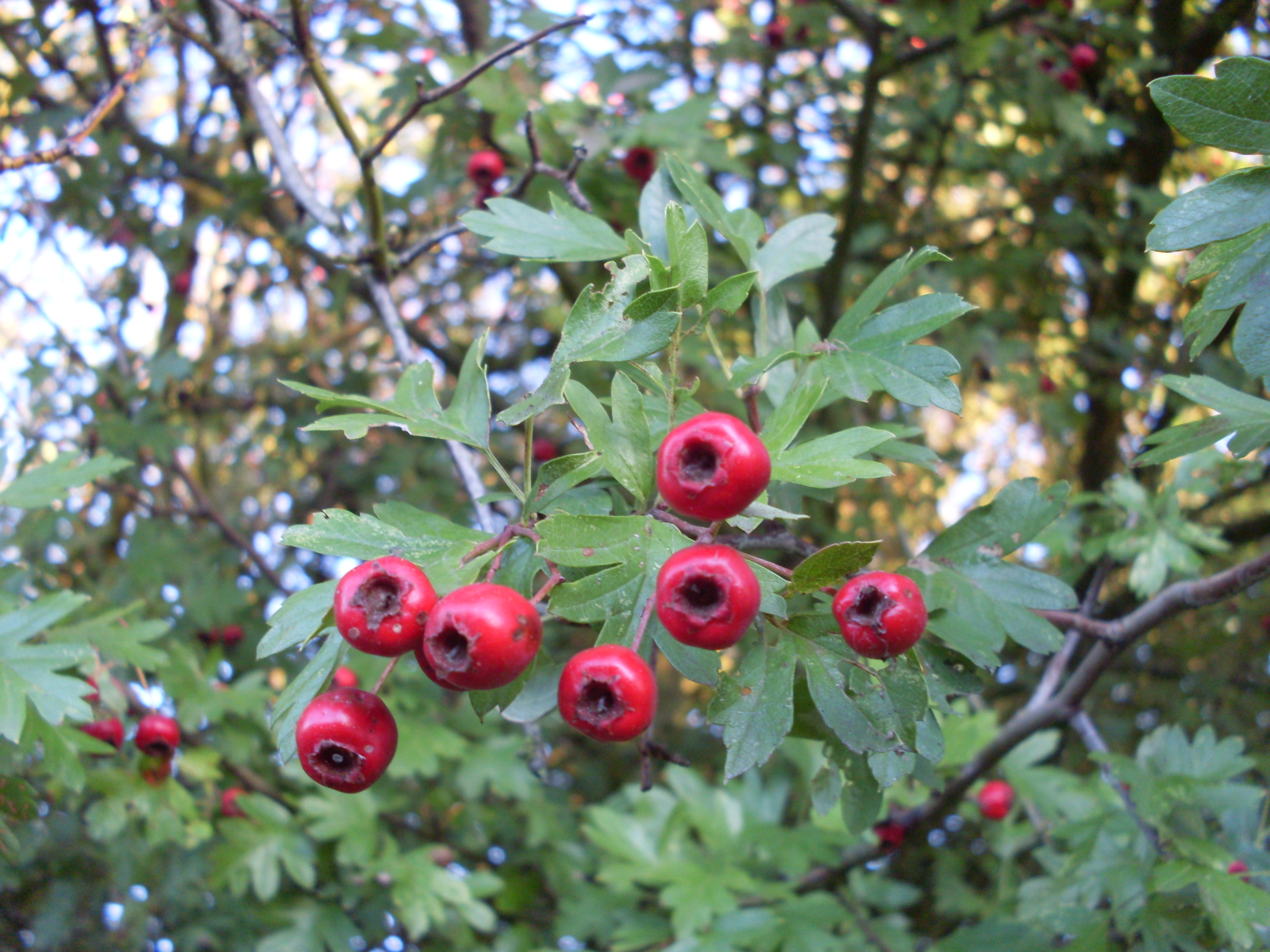

Conservation status
- Least Concern (IUCN 3.1)

Scientific classification
- Kingdom: Plantae
- Clade: Tracheophytes
- Clade: Angiosperms
- Clade: Eudicots
- Clade: Rosids
- Order: Rosales
- Family: Rosaceae
- Genus: Crataegus
- Section: Crataegus sect. Crataegus
- Series: Crataegus ser. Crataegus
- Species: C. monogyna

Binomial name
- Crataegus monogyna Jacq.
- Distribution map

Synonyms
- Many, including: Crataegus elegans (Poir.) Mutel; Crataegus polyacantha Jan

= Crataegus monogyna =

Species of flowering plant in the rose family

Crataegus monogyna, known as common hawthorn, may tree, whitethorn, one-seed hawthorn, or single-seeded hawthorn, is a species of flowering plant in the rose family, Rosaceae. It grows to about 10 metres (33 feet) tall, producing hermaphrodite flowers in late spring. The berry-like pomes (known as haws) contain a stone-encased seed.

The plant is native to Europe, but has been introduced in many other parts of the world. The pome flesh is of little culinary interest due to its dryness, but is used to make jellies. The young leaves and petals are also edible.

== Description ==
The common hawthorn is a shrub or small tree up to about 10 metres (33 feet) tall, with a dense crown. The bark is dull brown with vertical orange cracks. The younger stems bear sharp thorns, about 12.5 millimetres (1/2 inch) long. The leaves are 20 to 40 mm (3/4 to 1 1/2 in) long, obovate, and deeply lobed, sometimes almost to the midrib, with the lobes spreading at a wide angle. The upper surface is dark green above and paler underneath.

The hermaphrodite flowers are produced in late spring (May to early June in its native area) in corymbs of 5–25 together; they have numerous red stamens and a single style and are moderately fragrant. The flowers are white, frequently pink. They are pollinated by midges, bees, and other insects, and later in the year bear numerous haws. The haw is a small, oval, dark red fruit about 10 mm (0.39 in) long, berry-like, but structurally a pome containing a single seed within a stone, the pyrene. The haws develop in groups of two or three along smaller branches. They are pulpy and delicate in taste.

Its fruit persists for an average of 107.3 days, and bears an average of 2.8 seeds per fruit. Fruits average 75.7% water, and their dry weight includes 9.0% carbohydrates and 1.0% lipids.

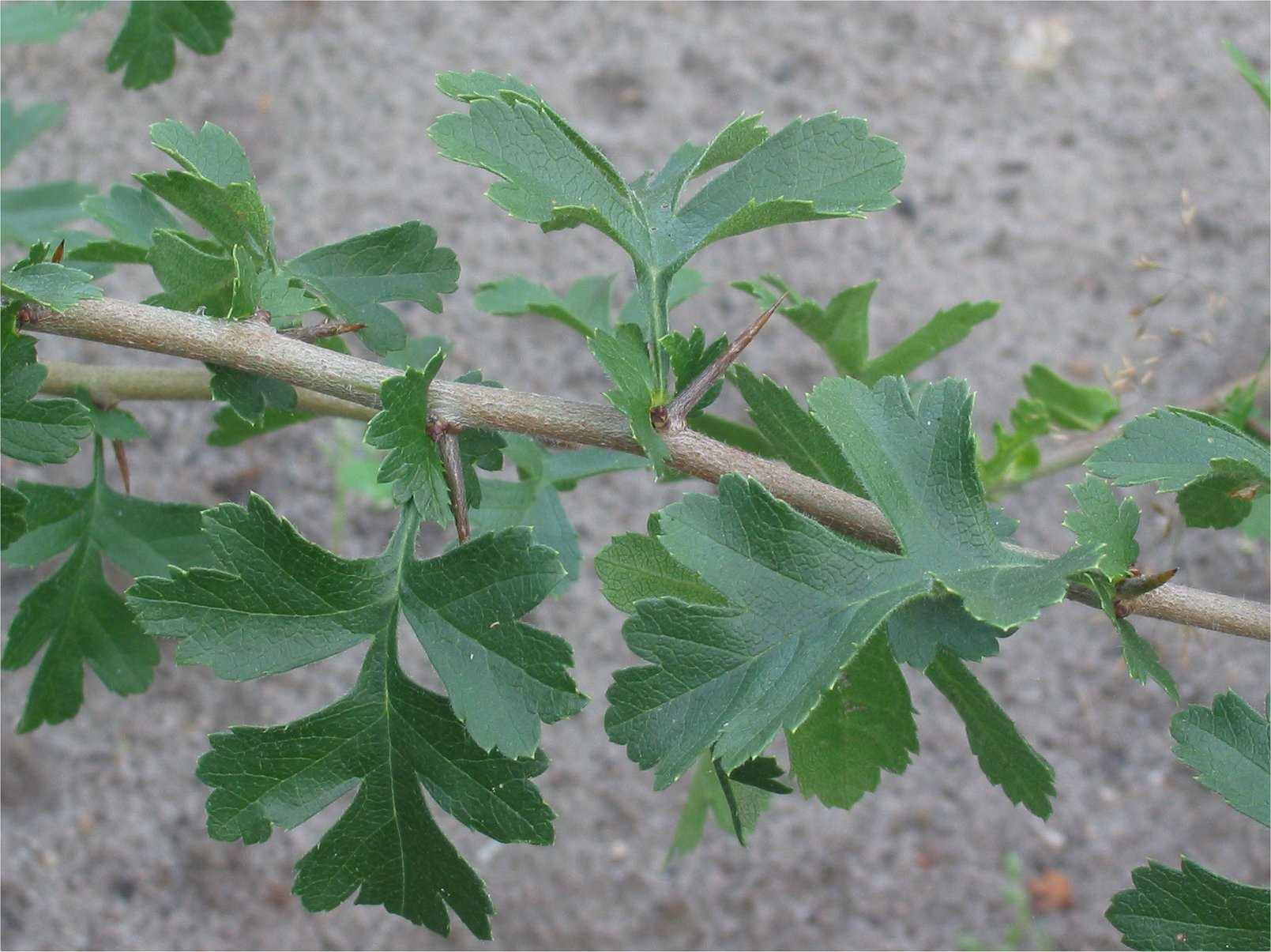
Leaves

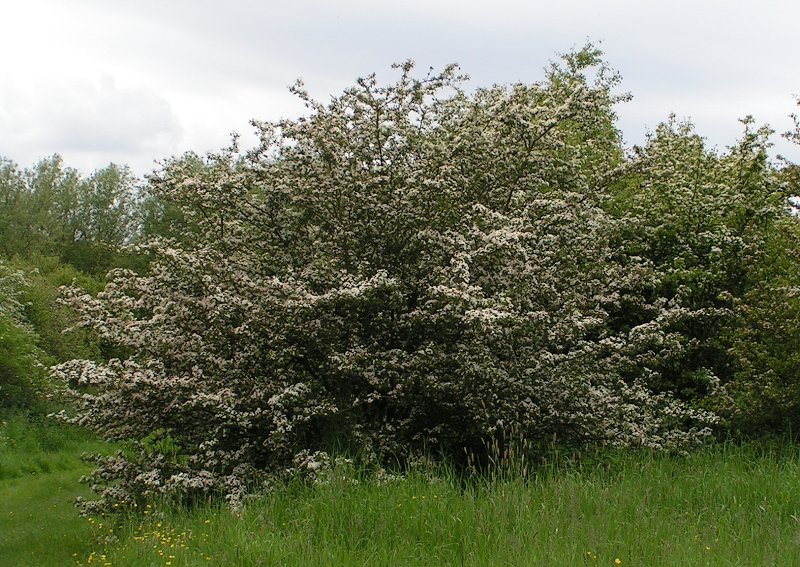
In bloom

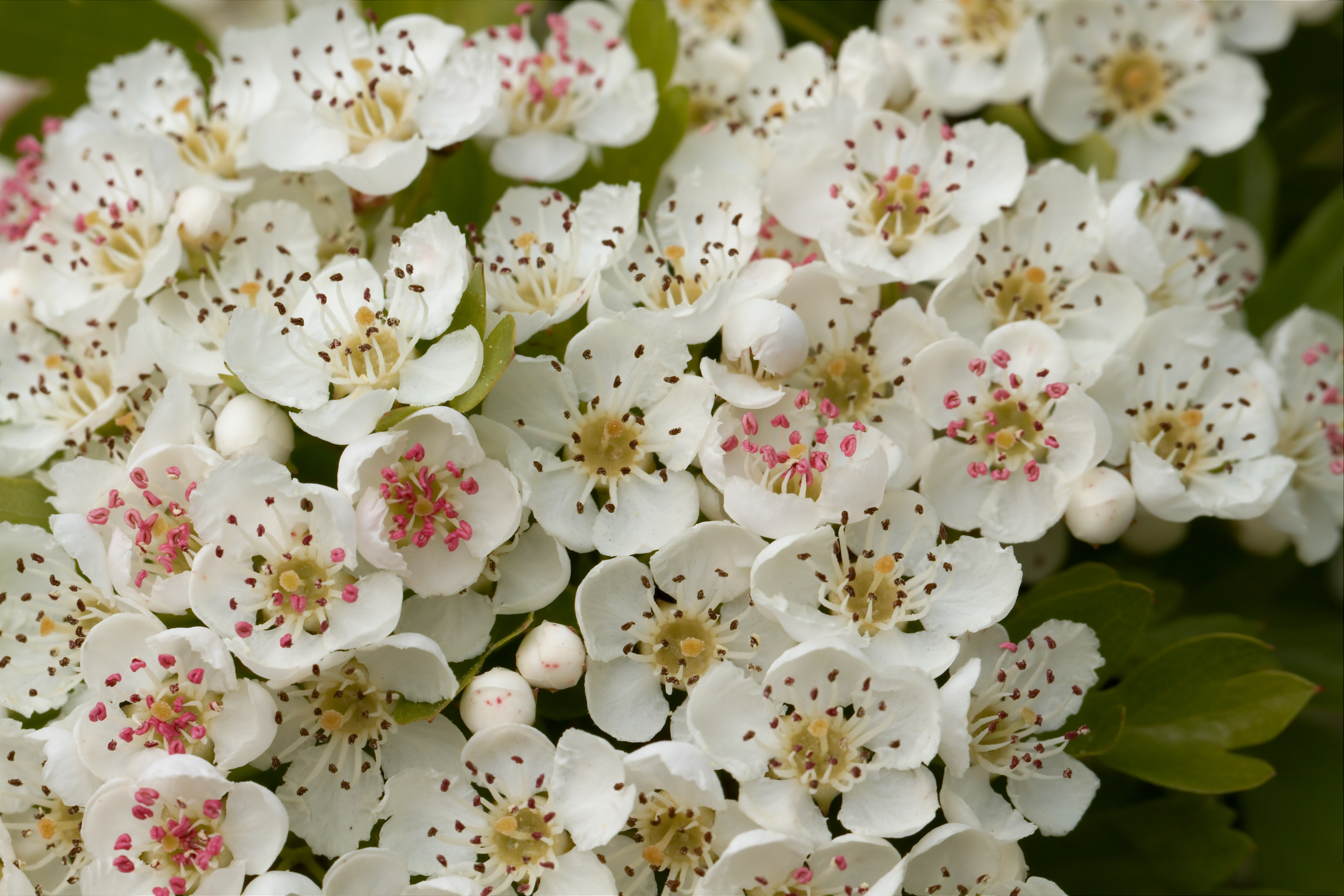
Flowers

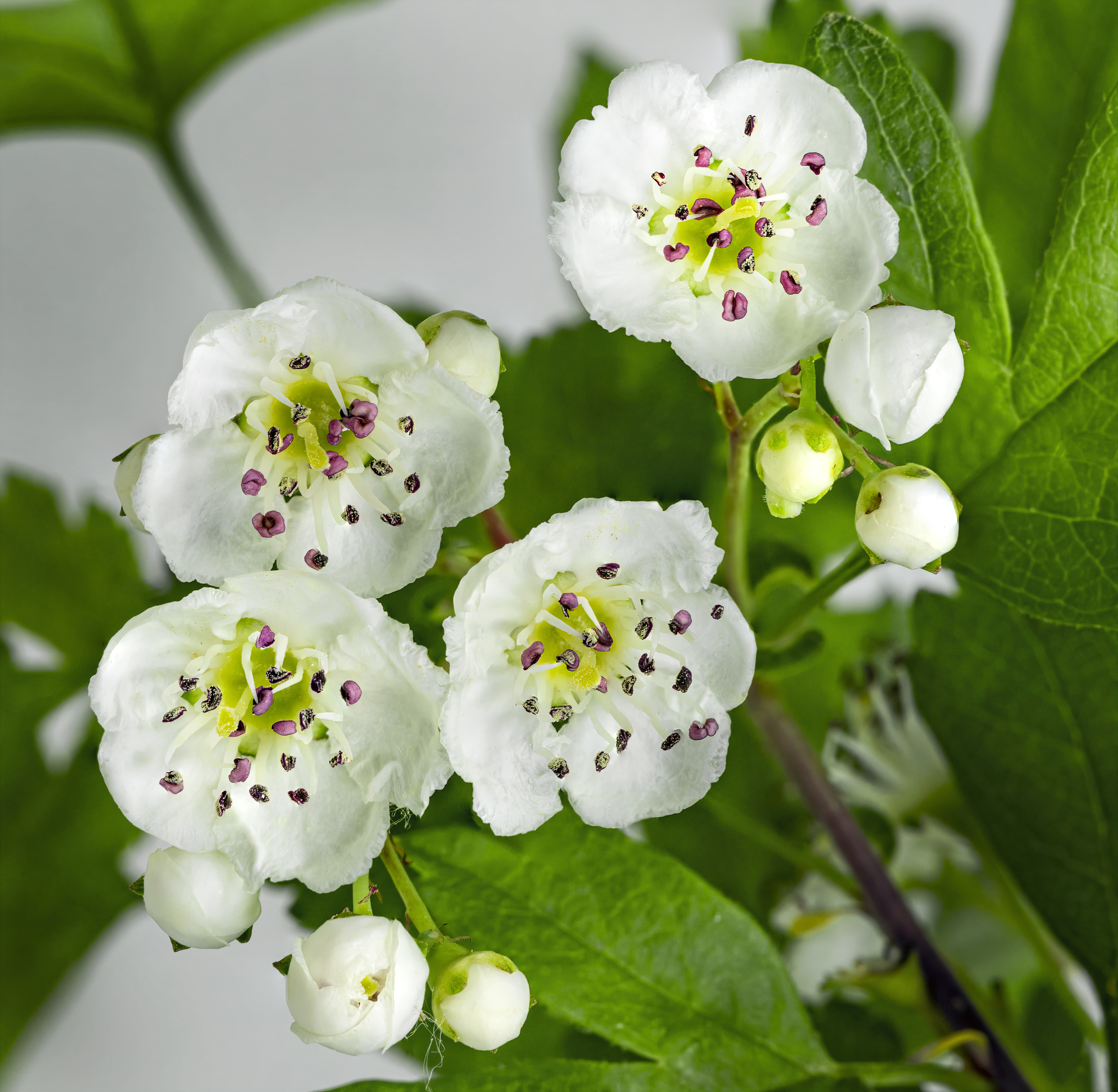
Close-up of flowers

Joncret, Belgium

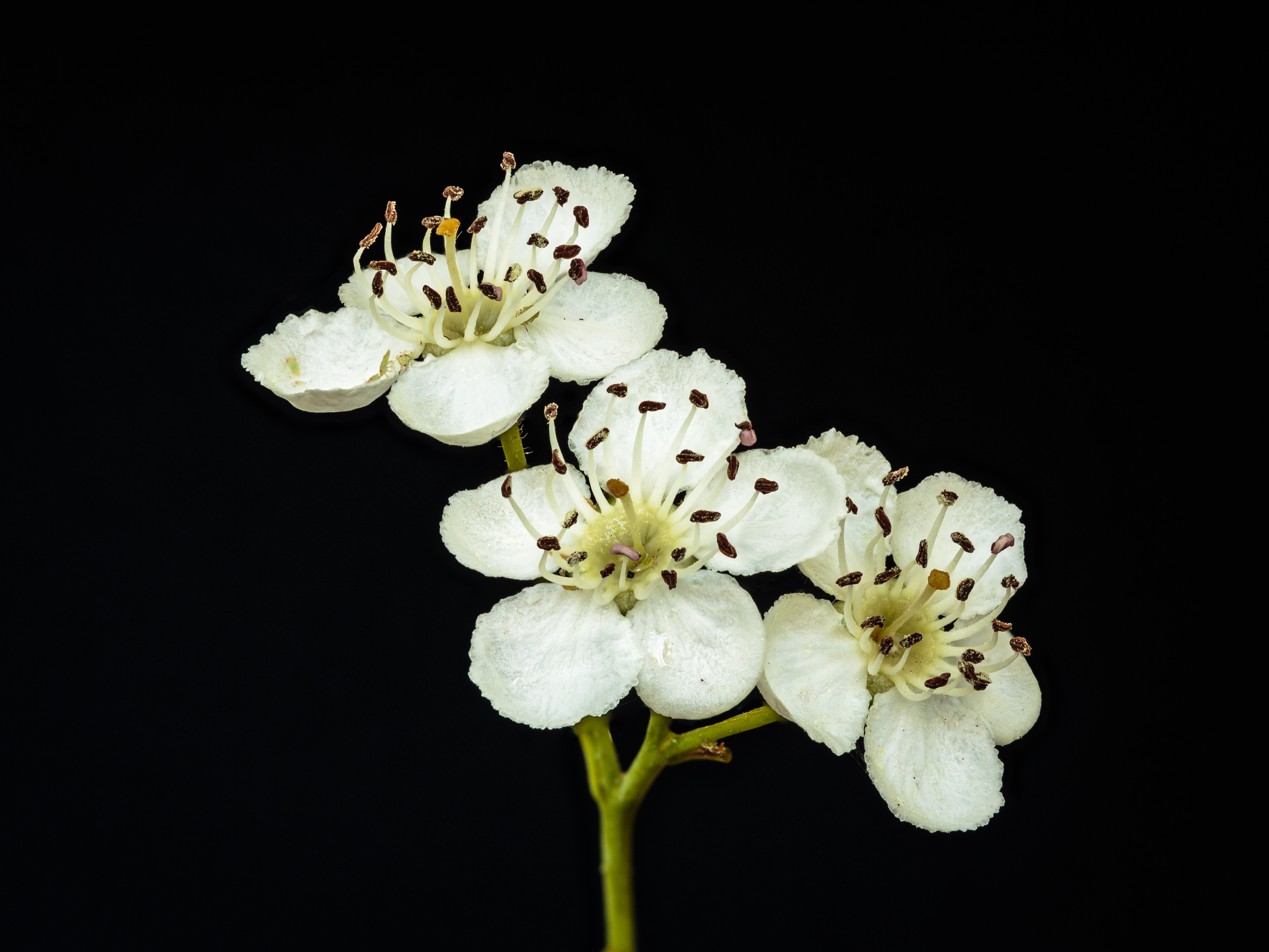
Flowers of Crataegus monogyna

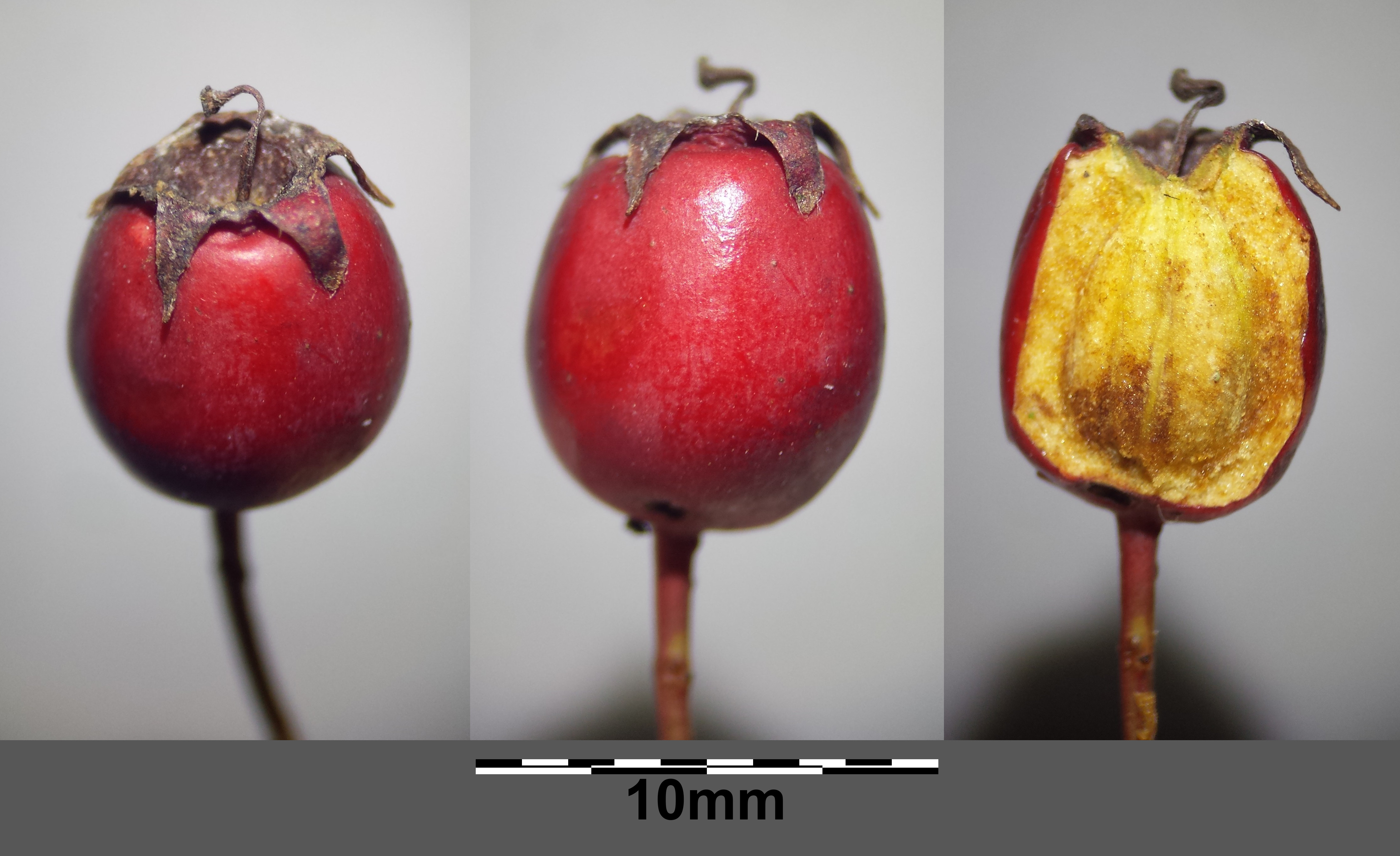
Fruit containing a stone (pyrene)

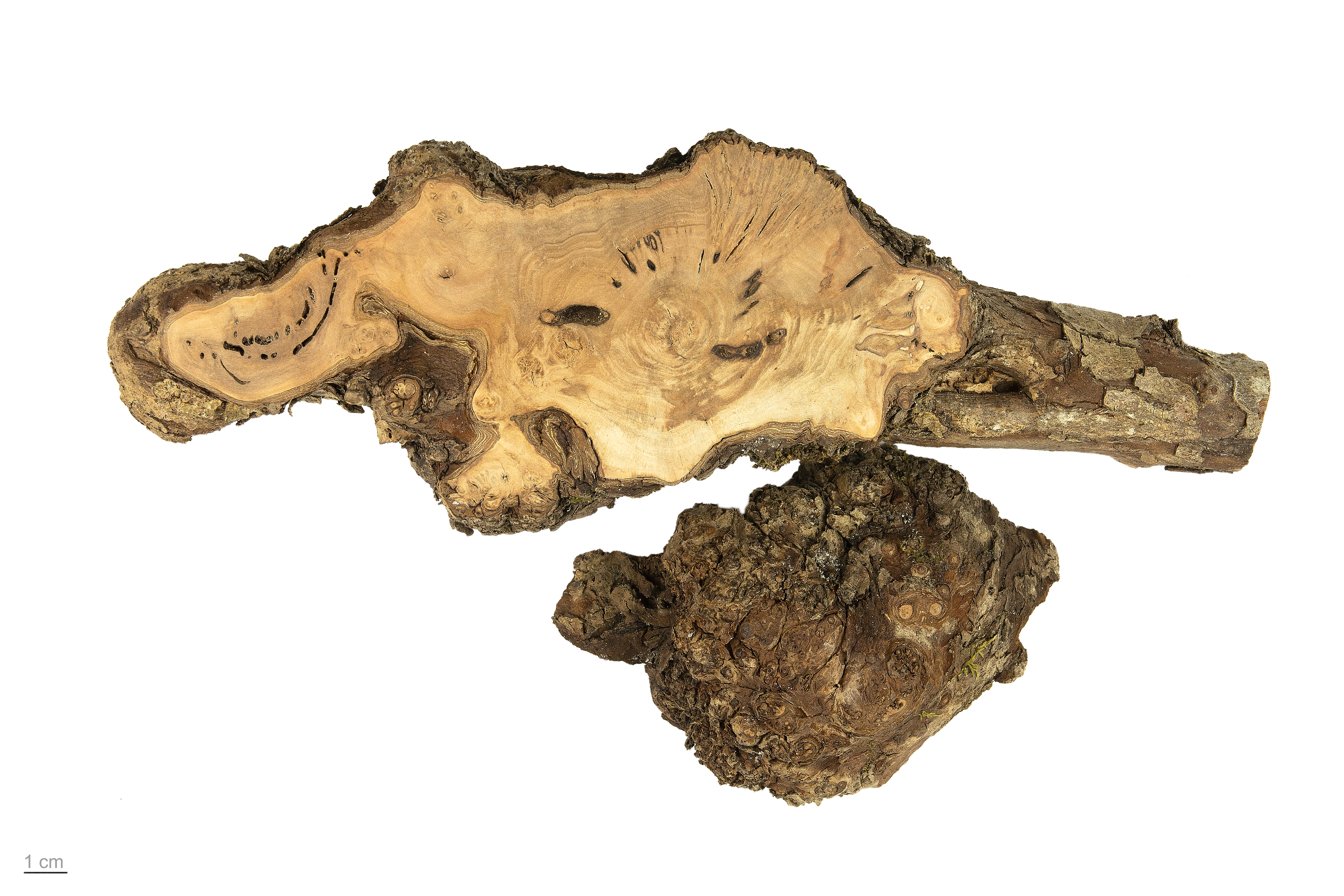
Museum specimen - wood

=== Similar species ===
The common hawthorn is distinguished from the related but less widespread Midland hawthorn (C. laevigata) by its more upright growth, the leaves being deeply lobed, with spreading lobes, and the flowers having just one style, not two or three. They are interfertile, however, so hybrids occur frequently; they are only entirely distinct in their more typical forms. Another species that also hybridises with the common hawthorn is Crataegus rhipidophylla, which is distinguished by having finely instead of coarsely serrated lobe margins.

The pomes of some other hawthorns may have up to five seeds.

== Taxonomy ==
This species is one of several that have been referred to as Crataegus oxyacantha, a name that has been rejected by the botanical community as too ambiguous. In 1793, Medikus published the name C. apiifolia for a European hawthorn now included in C. monogyna, but that name is illegitimate under the rules of botanical nomenclature.

Other common names include may, mayblossom, maythorn, (as the plant generally flowers in May) quickthorn, whitethorn, motherdie, and haw.

== Distribution and habitat ==
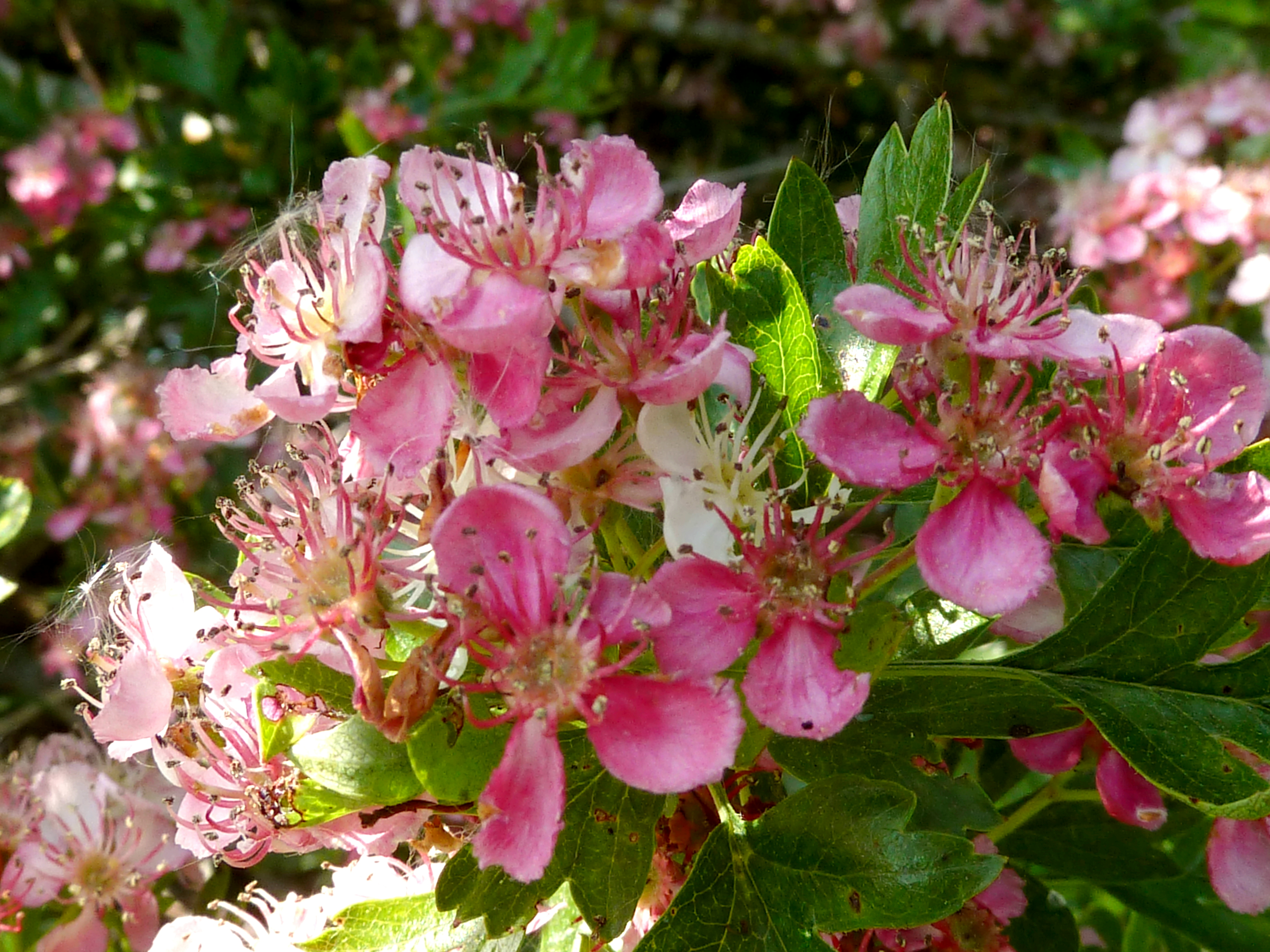
Flowers, North Yorkshire, England

The common hawthorn is native to Europe, being found in Ireland and Britain. It is also found in northwestern Africa and Western Asia, and has become naturalised in the Pacific Northwest in North America.

It grows in disturbed, semi-cleared areas.

== Ecology ==
Haws are important for wildlife in winter, particularly thrushes and waxwings; these birds eat the haws and disperse the seeds in their droppings.

Due to excessive animal grazing in the area, new shoots of vulnerable C. monogyna trees in the open field are eaten by animals. This does not allow them to grow and causes them to take a horizontally irregular shape on the ground.

A study in Wales indicated that current levels of overgrazing by sheep might extirpate the species in 60–70 years.

== Uses ==
=== Food ===
The fruit of hawthorn, called haws, are sometimes said to be edible raw once the seed is removed, but are too dry to be of interest. They are commonly made into jellies, jams, syrups, or wine, or to add flavour to brandy.

The young leaves are tender enough to be used in salads. The petals are also edible. Hawthorn petals are used in the medieval English recipe for spinee, an almond milk-based pottage recorded in The Forme of Cury by the head chef of King Richard II, c. 1390.

=== Medicine ===
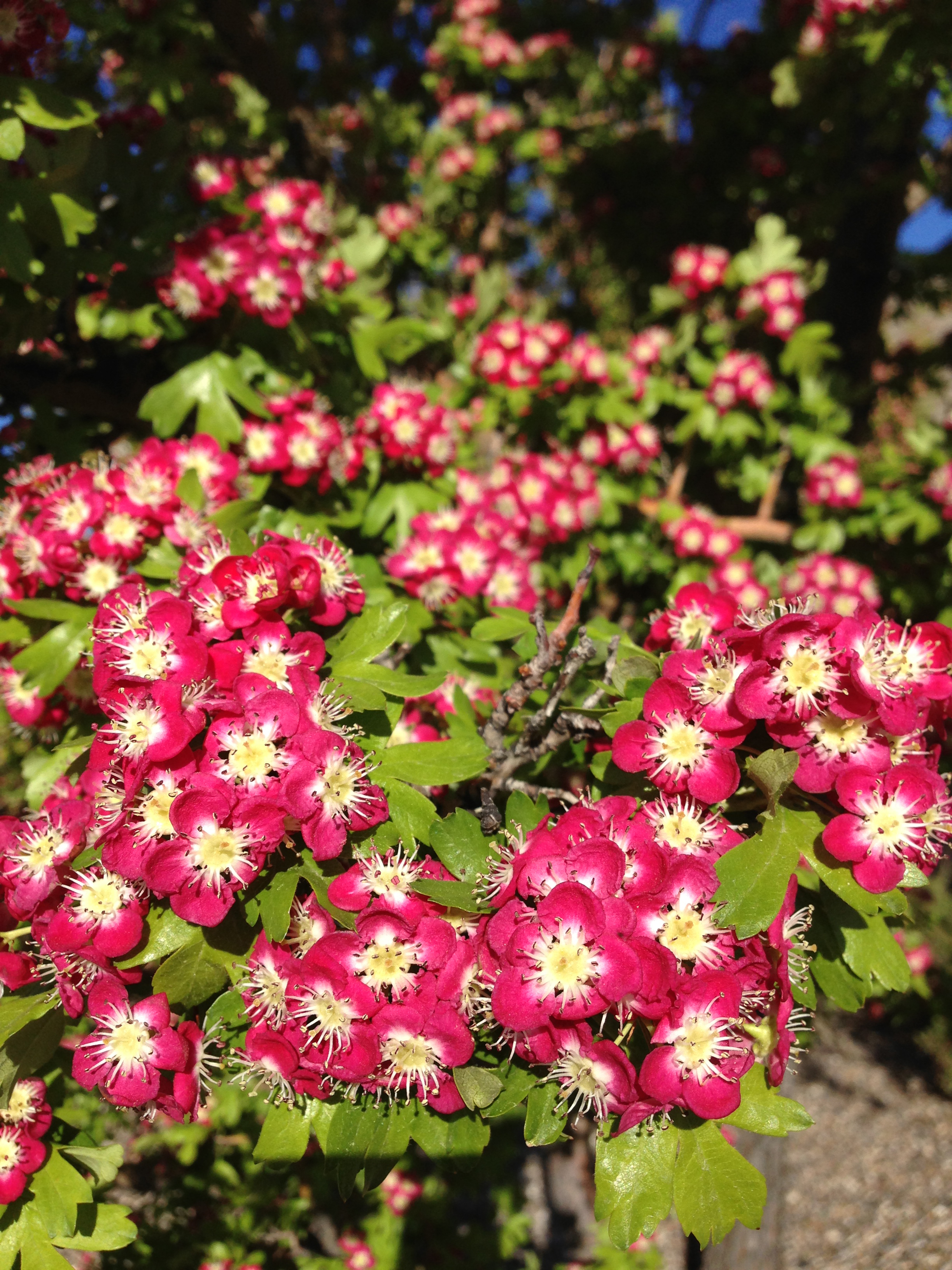
'Crimson Cloud' in Elko, Nevada

C. monogyna is one of the most common species used as the "hawthorn" of traditional herbalism. The plant parts used are usually sprigs with both leaves and flowers, or alternatively the fruit ("berries"). Hawthorn has been investigated by evidence-based medicine for treating cardiac insufficiency.

C. monogyna is a source of antioxidant phytochemicals, especially extracts of hawthorn leaves with flowers.

=== Gardening and agriculture ===
Common hawthorn is extensively planted as a hedge plant, especially for agricultural use. Its spines and close branching habit render it effectively livestock- and human-proof, with some basic maintenance. The traditional practice of hedgelaying is most commonly practised with this species. It is a good firewood, which burns with a good heat and little smoke.

Numerous hybrids exist, some of which are used as garden shrubs. The most widely used hybrid is C. × media (C. monogyna × C. laevigata), of which several cultivars are known, including the very popular 'Paul's Scarlet' with dark pink double flowers. Other garden shrubs that have sometimes been suggested as possible hybrids involving the common hawthorn, include the various-leaved hawthorn of the Caucasus, which is only very occasionally found in parks and gardens.

== In culture ==
In pre-modern Europe, hawthorn was used as a symbol of hope, and also as a charm against witchcraft and vampires. Hawthorn was believed by some to have the ability to inhibit intruding supernatural forces, and was also thought to be sacred in nature due to an association between the hawthorn bush and the crown of thorns that, according to the New Testament, was placed on Jesus.

As protection against witchcraft, hawthorn was sometimes placed in the cradles of infants, or around houses and doorways. The Greeks reportedly placed pieces of hawthorn in casement windows to prevent witches from entering houses, while Bohemians placed hawthorn on the thresholds of cow houses for the same purpose. Hawthorn was sometimes placed on the coffin of a deceased person, on top of the person's corpse, or in the corpse's sock. In Bosnia, women would sometimes place a piece of hawthorn behind the headcloth of a recently deceased person, and then throw away the remaining twig on their way home. If the deceased person was a vampire, it would focus its attention on the hawthorn instead of following the woman home. Among the South Slavs, stakes made of hawthorn or blackthorn wood were considered effective in impaling vampires.

=== Notable trees ===
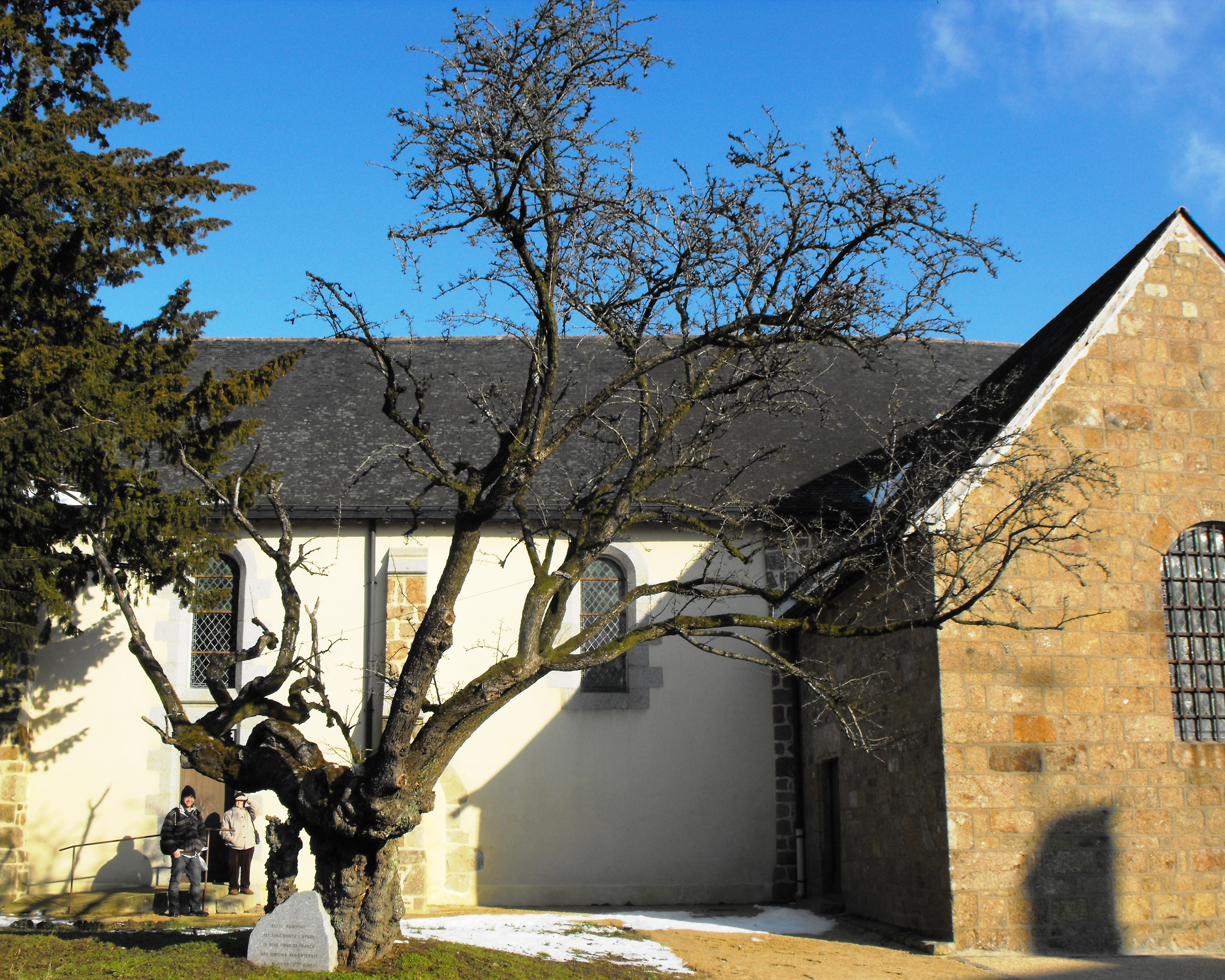
The Saint-Mars tree

An ancient specimen, and reputedly the oldest tree of any species in France, is to be found alongside the church at Saint Mars sur la Futaie, Mayenne. As of 2009, the tree had a height of 9 m (30 ft) and a girth of 2.65 m (8 1/2 ft). The inscription on the plaque beneath reads: "This hawthorn is probably the oldest tree in France. Its origin goes back to St Julien (third century)"; this has not yet been verified.

A famous specimen in England was the Glastonbury or Holy Thorn which, according to legend, sprouted from the staff of Joseph of Arimathea after he thrust it into the ground while visiting Glastonbury in the first century AD. The tree was noteworthy because it flowered twice in a year, once in the late spring which is normal, but also once after the harshness of midwinter had passed. The original tree at Glastonbury Abbey, felled in the 1640s during the English Civil War, has been propagated as the cultivar 'Biflora'. A replacement was planted by the local council in 1951, but was truncated by vandals in 2010.

The oldest known living specimen in East Anglia, and possibly in the United Kingdom, is known as the Hethel Old Thorn, and is located in the churchyard in the small village of Hethel, south of Norwich, in Norfolk. It is reputed to be more than 700 years old, having been planted in the thirteenth century.

== See also ==
- Crataegus § Folklore
- Dasineura crataegi – the dipteran gall-midge, which causes the hawthorn button-top gall
- Haweater

== Bibliography ==
- Ehrlén, Johan; Eriksson, Ove (1991). "Phenological variation in fruit characteristics in vertebrate-dispersed plants". Oecologia. 86 (4): 463–470. Bibcode:1991Oecol..86..463E. doi:10.1007/BF00318311. ISSN 0029-8549. PMID 28313326.

=== Further reading ===
- Melton, J. Gordon (1994). The Vampire Book: The Encyclopedia of the Undead. Visible Ink Press. ISBN 978-1-57859-076-6.
