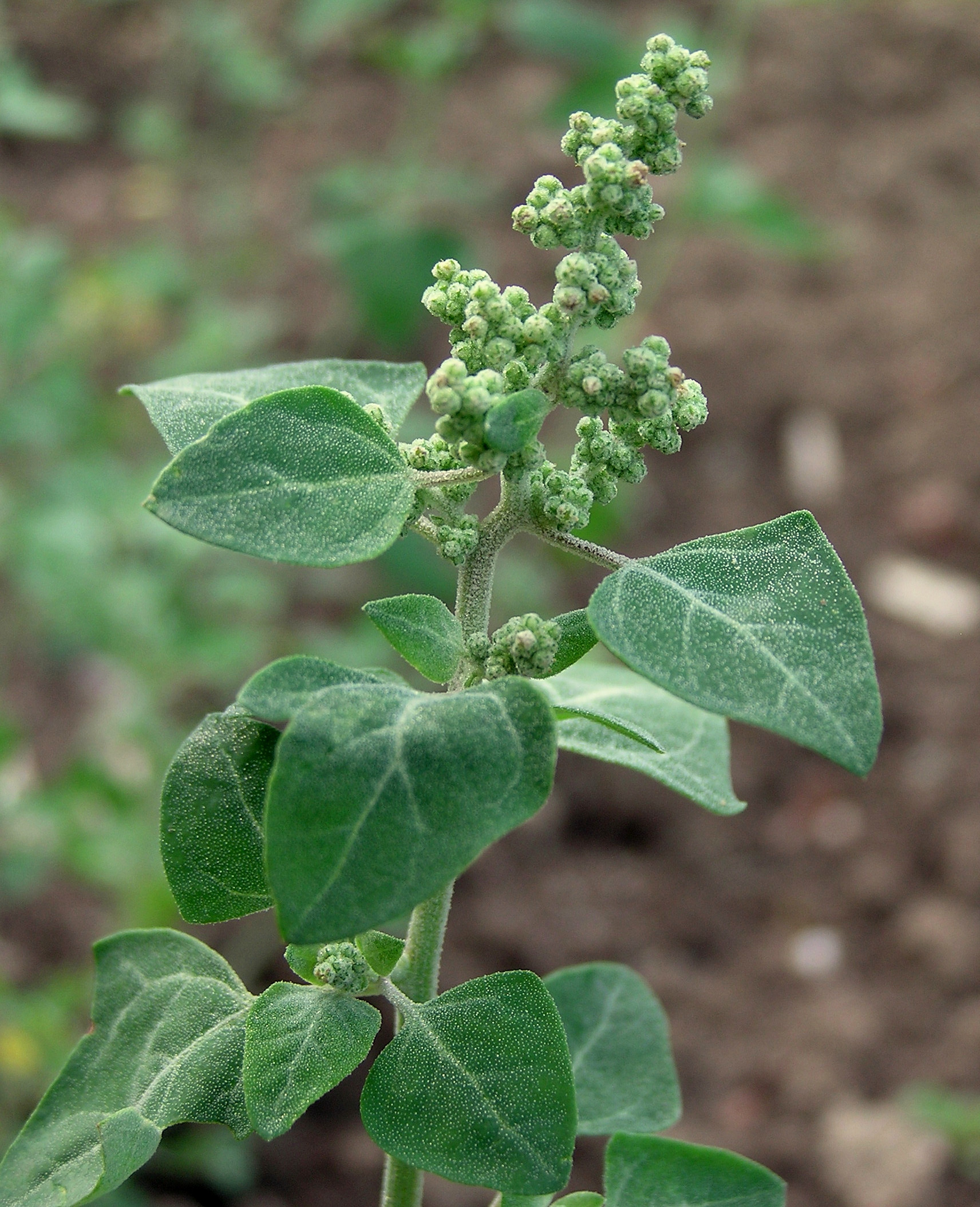

Scientific classification
- Kingdom: Plantae
- Clade: Tracheophytes
- Clade: Angiosperms
- Clade: Eudicots
- Order: Caryophyllales
- Family: Amaranthaceae
- Genus: Chenopodium
- Species: C. vulvaria

Binomial name
- Chenopodium vulvaria L.

= Chenopodium vulvaria =

Species of flowering plant

Chenopodium vulvaria, stinking goosefoot is a foul-smelling plant that grows on bare ground in coastal habitats in the Mediterranean region and is associated with dung heaps and disturbed ground inland. It is native to southern Europe and western Asia and has spread to northern Europe and other temperate parts of the world with agriculture.

== Description ==
Stinking goosefoot is a small, prostrate to ascending annual with stems up to 60 cm (2 ft) long, smelling strongly of rotten fish. The stems are about 2 mm in diameter with reddish ridges and green mealy hollows. The leaves are grey-green, alternate, entire or with a single tooth, ovate to kite-shaped and measure 1.0–2.5 cm in length. Grey vesicular hairs are present on the stem and underside of the leaves giving it the 'mealy' appearance.

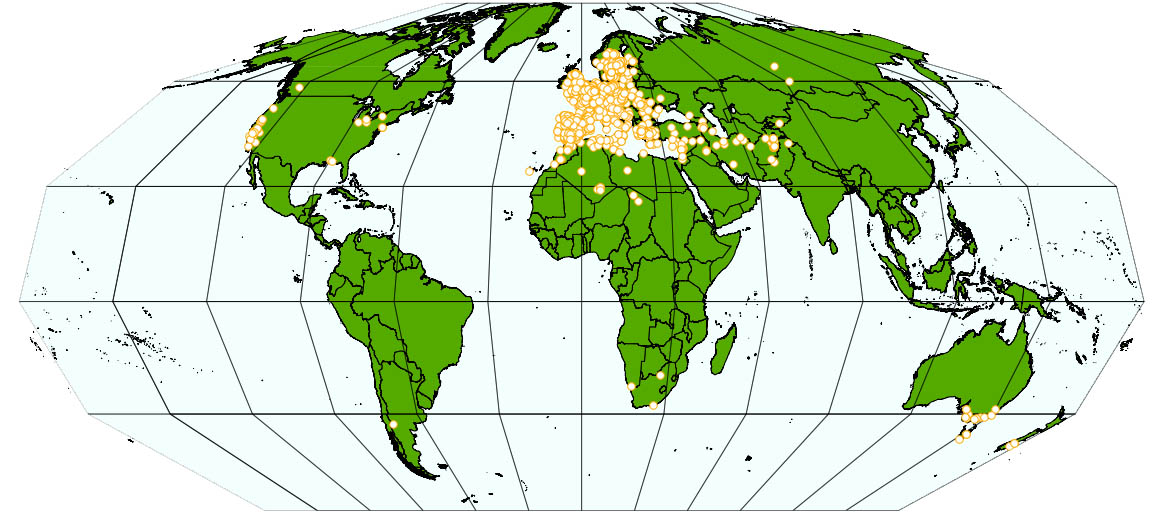
World distribution

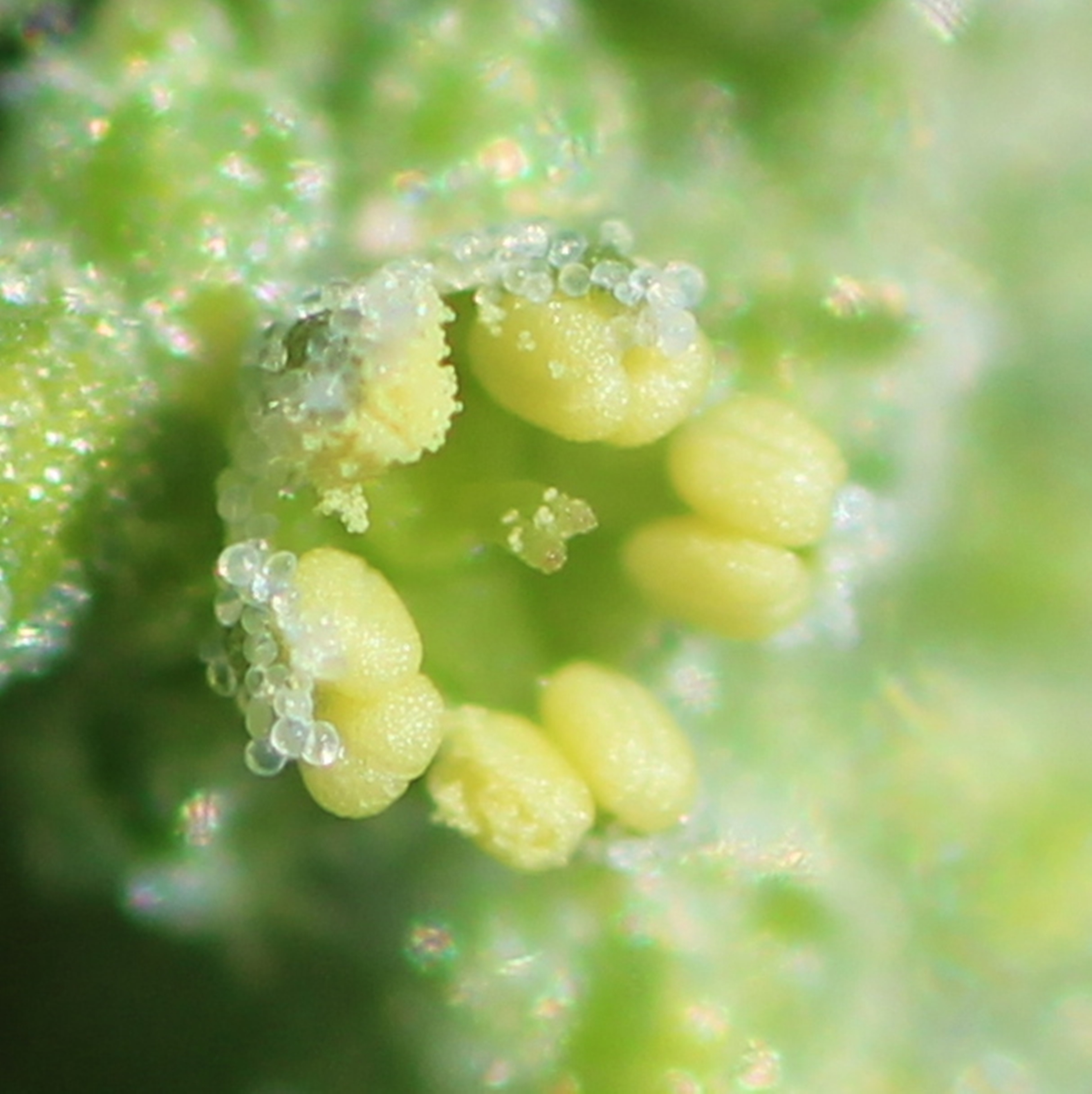
An open flower (magnified)

The inflorescence is a cyme consisting of small clusters of rounded green flowers with four to five tepals (perianth segments) and one to five stamens on the bisexual flowers, or just one style with two stigmas on the female flowers. The fruits are membranous achenes that fall with the remains of the perianth (flower parts). The shiny, blackish seeds are about 1.2 mm in diameter and are lens-shaped, with faint radial furrows on the testa (seed coat).

== Taxonomy ==
Chenopodium vulvaria was traditionally a member of the plant family Chenopodiaceae (goosefoots), but genetic studies have shown that they are not distinct from the Amaranthaceae (amaranths) and so they are now combined. The main difference was that goosefoots have green perianths (tepals) and the fruits are dehiscent (split open when ripe), whereas the tepals are brown in the amaranths and the fruits indehiscent. These differences identify the subfamily Chenopodioideae under the APG III system.

The name was published by Linnaeus in Species Plantarum, vol. 1, p. 220. No description is provided; instead there are references to it being previously known as Chenopodium foliis integerrimis rhombeo-ovatis, floribus conglomeratis ("the goosefoot with entire, rhomboid-ovate leaves and clusters of flowers"), Chenopodium foliis triangulari-ovatis ("...with triangular-ovate leaves") and, simply, Atriplex foetida ("stinking orache"). He described it as growing "in Europae cultis oleraceis" ("vegetable crops in Europe").

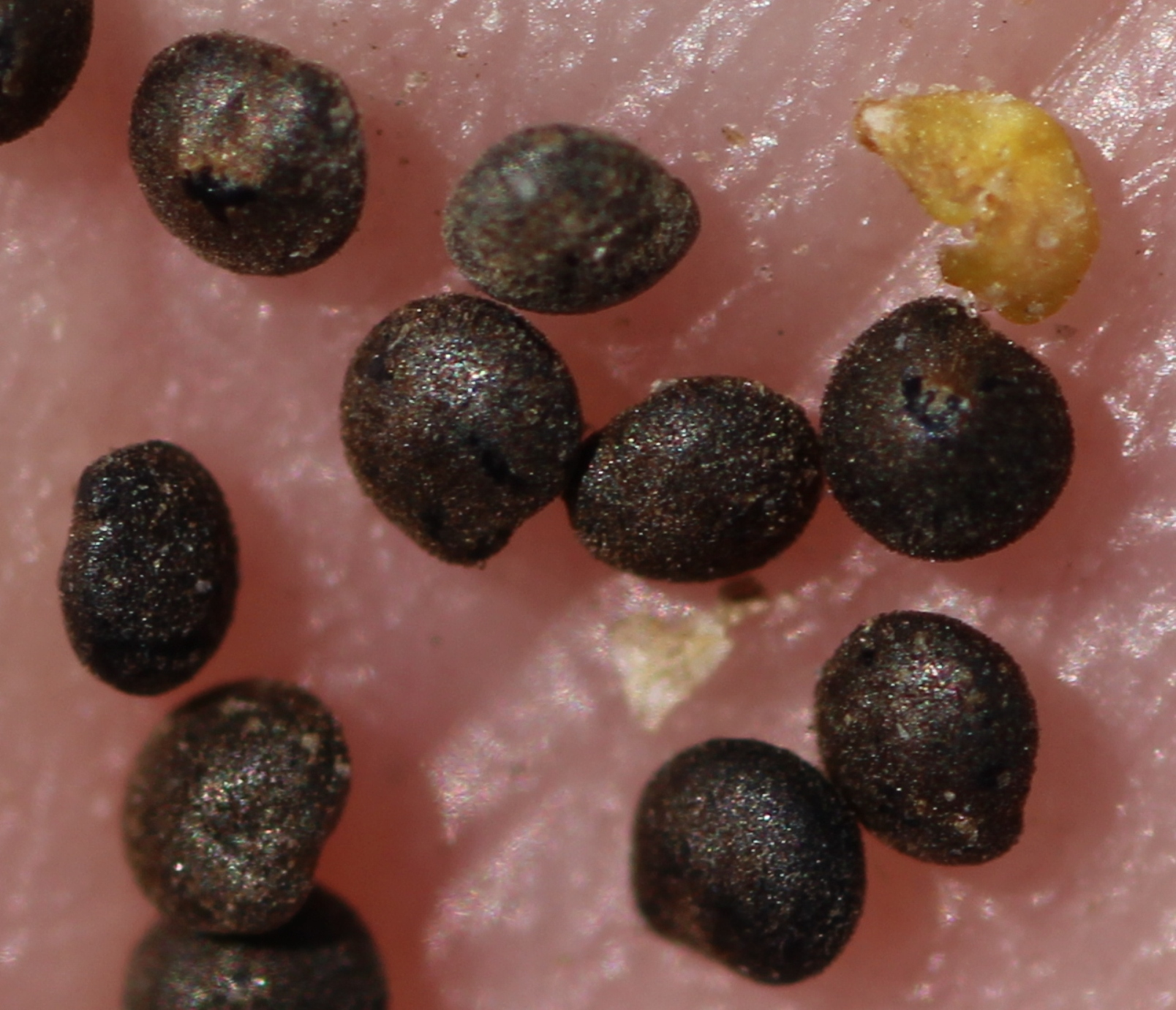
Seeds

Several synonyms have been published over the years, including Blitum foetidum Hill (1757), Anserina foetida (Lam.) Montandon (1856) and Chenopodium rhombicum (Murr) F. Dvorák (1986), but none has persisted. A full list can be found in the Synonymic Checklists of the Plants of the World.

It is not known to hybridise with any other species.

Several varieties have been described over the years, such as Chenopodium vulvaria var. microphyllum Moq. (1840), but they are not currently accepted.

Its chromosome number is 2n=18.

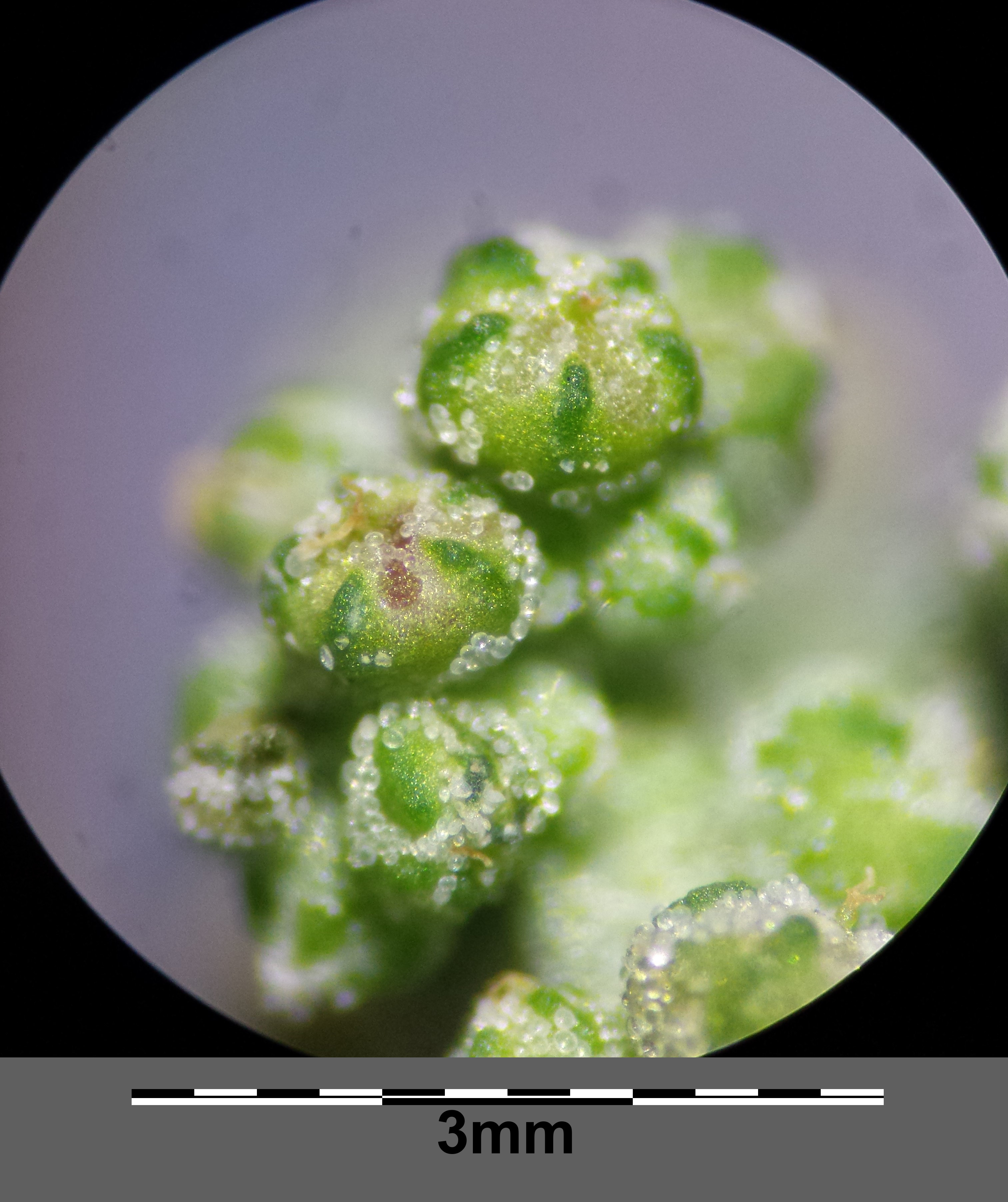
Micrograph of the unopened flowers, showing the glandular hairs

The name of the genus is derived from the Greek χήν (chen), "goose", and ποδίον (podion), "little foot", as a reference to the shape of the leaf. The specific epithet comes from the Latin term vulva. This may be due to an association between the odor of the plant and that of a bacterially imbalanced human vagina. Indeed, the plant contains trimethylamine, which has been suggested to be "the substance mainly responsible for the fishy odor often associated with bacterial vaginosis".

Its common names include notchweed, stinking motherwort, wild arrach, and goat's arrach.

== Distribution and status ==
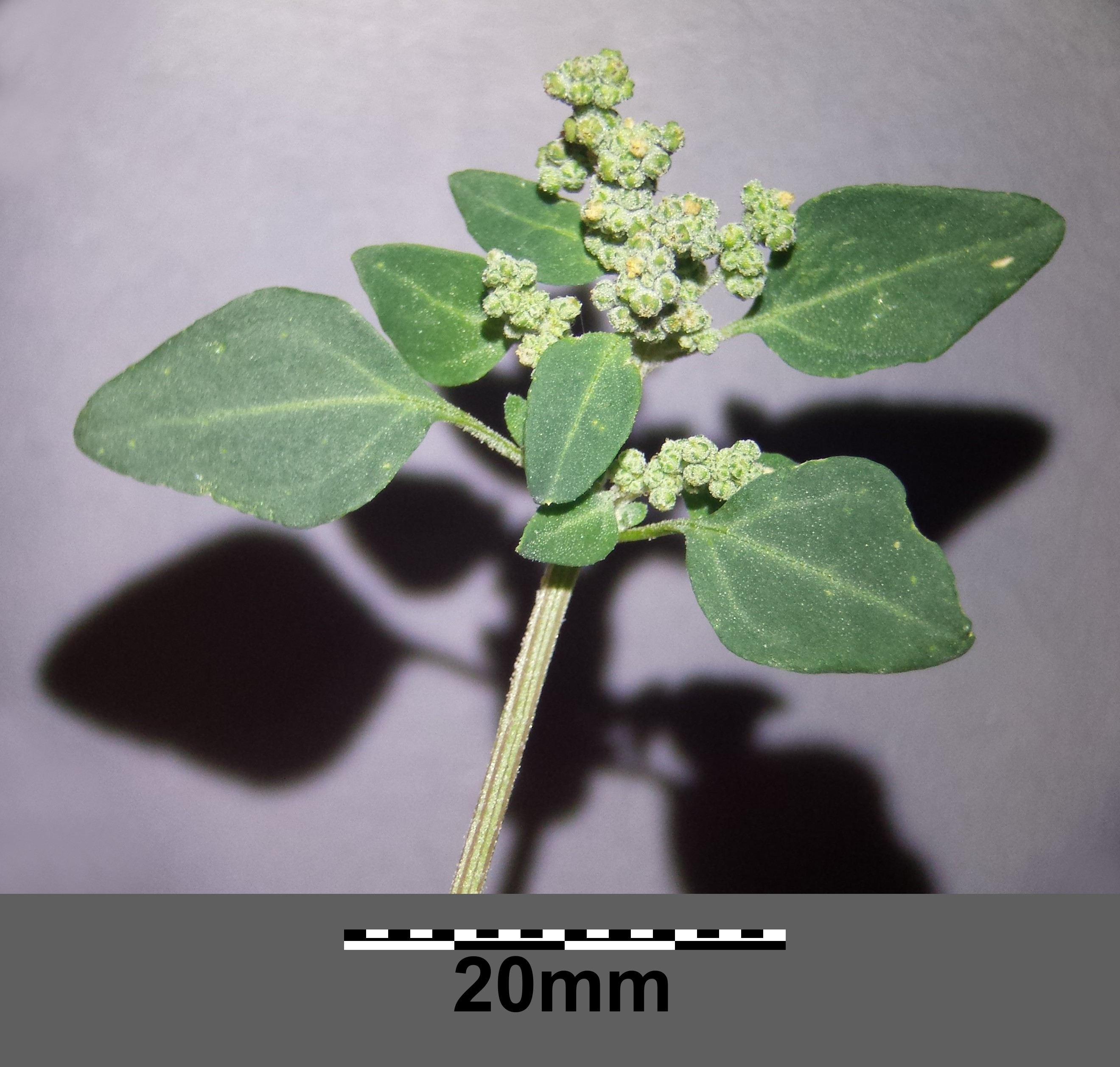
The leaves are typically rhombic and untoothed

The native distribution of stinking goosefoot is not entirely certain, but it is most likely to have been around the Mediterranean and Atlantic coasts of southern Europe and North Africa, spreading north by repeated introductions that tended not to persist. In recent times it has dispersed to many other areas around the globe, including both North and South America, Africa and Australasia.

Stinking goosefoot has not yet been assessed for its global status, but in France Chénopode fétide is common in the south and generally has the status LC (least concern) in the Mediterranean départements, while in the north it is much rarer: in Picardy it is classified as CR (critically endangered), while it is VU (vulnerable) in Brittany, EN (endangered) in Alsace and Lower Normandy, and considered to be extinct in Upper Normandy.

In Britain, it was shown in the 1950s to be present around the Thames Estuary and the southern coasts of England and Wales, with scattered populations as far north as southern Scotland. There had also (mostly historically) been a number of inland sites for it, but these were mostly considered to be introductions. Later studies showed a dramatic decline, including the loss of all the inland populations, and by the 1990s there were thought to be just 3 populations remaining. It was given the conservation status VU (vulnerable) and protected under Schedule 8 of the Wildlife and Countryside Act 1981. Conservation actions included fencing its sites from rabbit grazing and rotovating the soil to create bare ground. By 2020 it was found to have returned to the whole of its original range, including Scotland, and its status has been changed to EN (endangered) and "archaeophyte", which usually means an introduction associated with farming or urbanisation.

== Habitat and ecology ==
In Spain, stinking goosefoot is considered to be an annual therophyte of old fields, which is dispersed by ectozoochory (the seeds being attached to the skin or fur or feathers of animals). It is typical of bare ground and disappears as abandoned land undergoes natural succession. In Northern Europe, by contrast, it was historically often found in dung heaps, by the sides of roads, and at the bases of walls, leading to the conjecture that it is an archaeophyte which was frequently re-introduced from the south, by various (unknown) transport routes.

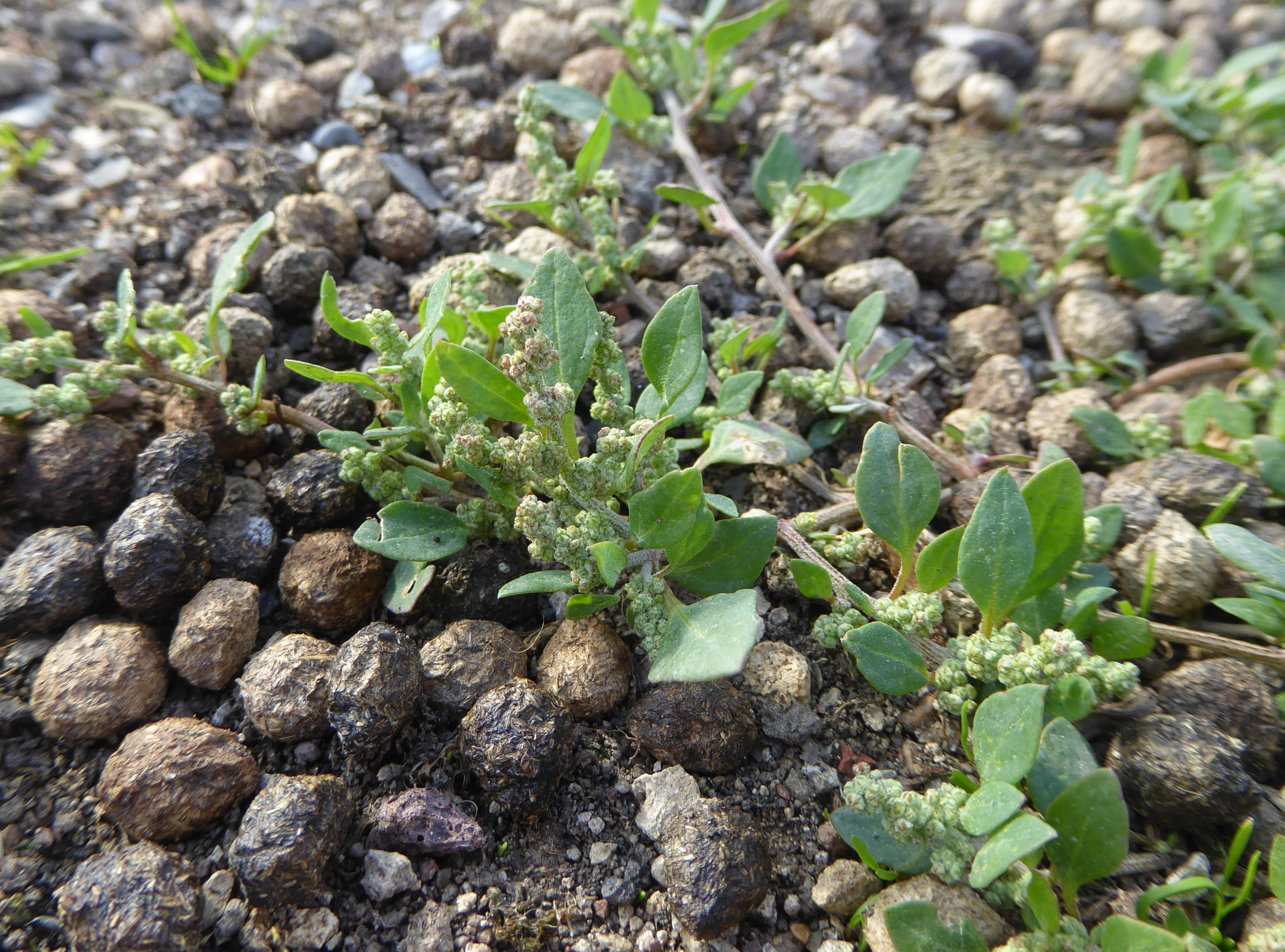
Typical habit of stinking goosefoot in coastal grassland in the Thames estuary

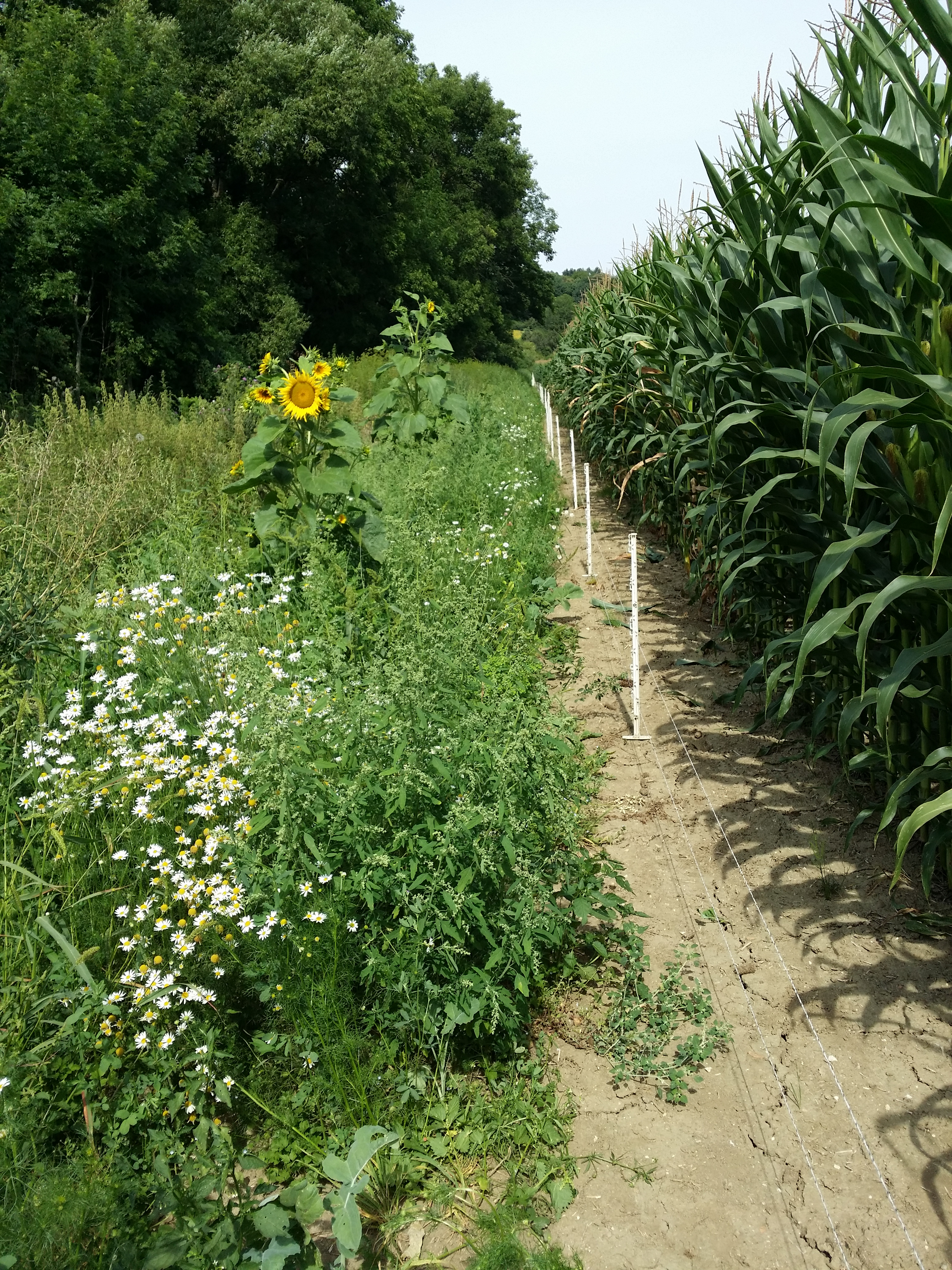
Stinking goosefoot growing as a weed in a cultivated field in Austria

Although it occurs in several plant communities in France, there is one in which it is particularly characteristic, the Chenopodium vulvaria - Atriplex rosea association, which occurs in the Camargue and elsewhere. This is described as a "highly nitrophilic, thermophilic wasteland in the vicinity of stables and other nitrogenous places in the Mediterranean region." In central and eastern Europe the typical habitat for it is the Malva neglecta – Chenopodium vulvaria community, which occurs on roadside verges and disturbed and trampled soils. Common associates include rye grass, wall barley and annual meadowgrass.

In Britain it was formerly a fairly widespread plant of farmland, waste ground and tracks, where it grew in places with plenty of bare ground, but in the 20th century it retreated to a few coastal sites, as a result of changing farming practices and particularly the substitution of manure with chemical fertilizer. It is tolerant of high levels of nitrogen in the soil, resulting from animal dung.

Its Ellenberg values in Britain are L = 7, F = 4, R = 7, N = 9, and S = 0, which show that it grows in full sunlight in places that are highly enriched with nitrogen, such as dung heaps and seabird roosts.

Pollination in goosefoots is usually either by wind or by self-pollination, but there are no studies on stinking goosefoot, specifically.

Nine species of insect are recorded feeding on stinking goosefoot. One of these is an aphid, Hayhurstia atriplicis (L.), which is found on the leaves. There are also eight species of Lepidoptera (moths) that are associated with it in Britain. The larvae of Eupithecia simpliciata (Haworth), the plain pug, and Pelurga comitata (L.), dark spinach, both feed on the flowers and fruit. For the rest, the caterpillars eat the leaves and roots: Caradrina morpheus (Hufnagel), the mottled rustic; Trachea atriplicis (L.), the orache moth; Discestra trifolii (Hufnagel), nutmeg; Lacanobia oleracea (L.), bright-line brown-eye; Agrotis exclamationis (L.), heart and dart; and Agrotis ipsilon (Hufnagel), dark sword-grass. None of these is exclusive to stinking goosefoot, and most of them feed on a wide variety of plants.

== Uses ==
Following the doctrine of signatures, mediaeval herbals contain mainly gynaecological uses for stinking goosefoot. Culpeper was enthusiastic in his praise for this plant: "it is common almost upon every dunghill. The works of God are freely given to man, his medicines are common and cheap, and easily to be found. I commend it for an universal medicine for the womb, and such a medicine as will easily, safely, and speedily cure any disease thereof." By the 20th century, however, it had rather fallen out of favour with herbalists. The chemical that gives stinking goosefoot its characteristic smell, TMA is now used in chemical processes and is known to be toxic at high concentrations.

== See also ==
- List of taxa named after human genitals
