= Crataegus oxyacantha =

Invalid botanical name

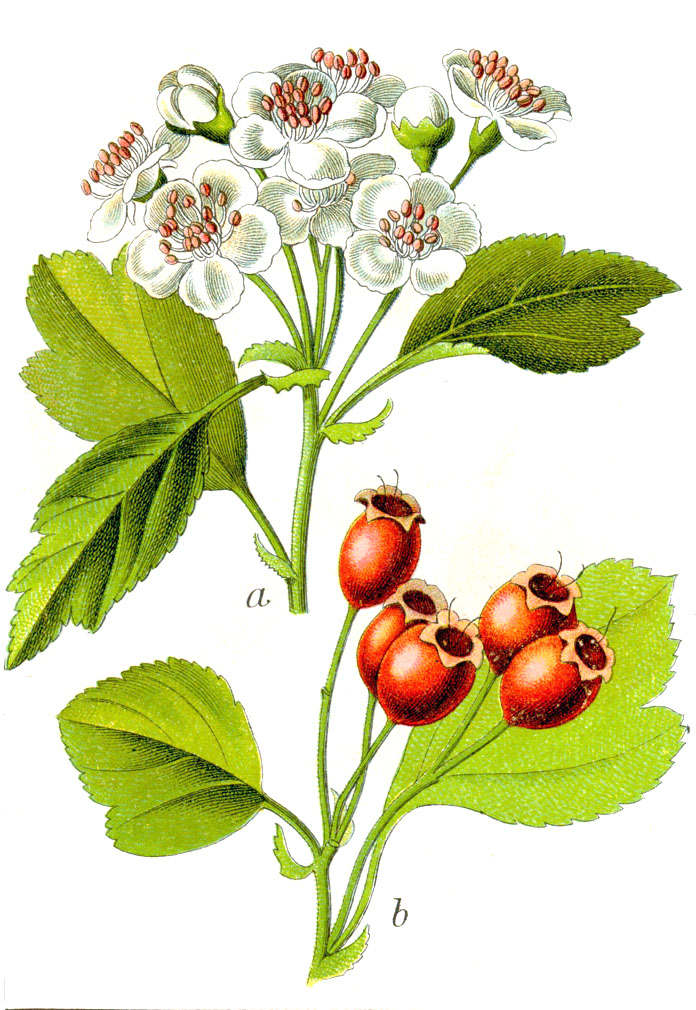
A form of Crataegus that was identified by Johann Georg Sturm as this species, but showing characteristics of leaf, anther, and style number that do not match Linnaeus' original type specimen

The name Crataegus oxyacantha L. has been rejected as being of uncertain application, but is sometimes still used.

== Taxonomy ==
Linnaeus introduced the name Crataegus oxyacantha for a species of Northern European hawthorn and the name gradually became used for several similar species, which were assumed to be the same, particularly the Midland hawthorn C. laevigata and the common hawthorn C. monogyna. In 1946, Dandy showed that Linnaeus had actually observed and described a single-styled species similar to the common hawthorn, and the Midland hawthorn was effectively a later discovery. However, Byatt showed that confusion over the true identity of C. oxyacantha remained, and the name was formally rejected as ambiguous by the International Botanical Congress. More recently, Christensen concluded that the species studied by Linnaeus matches C. rhipidophylla Gand., a relatively rare species.
