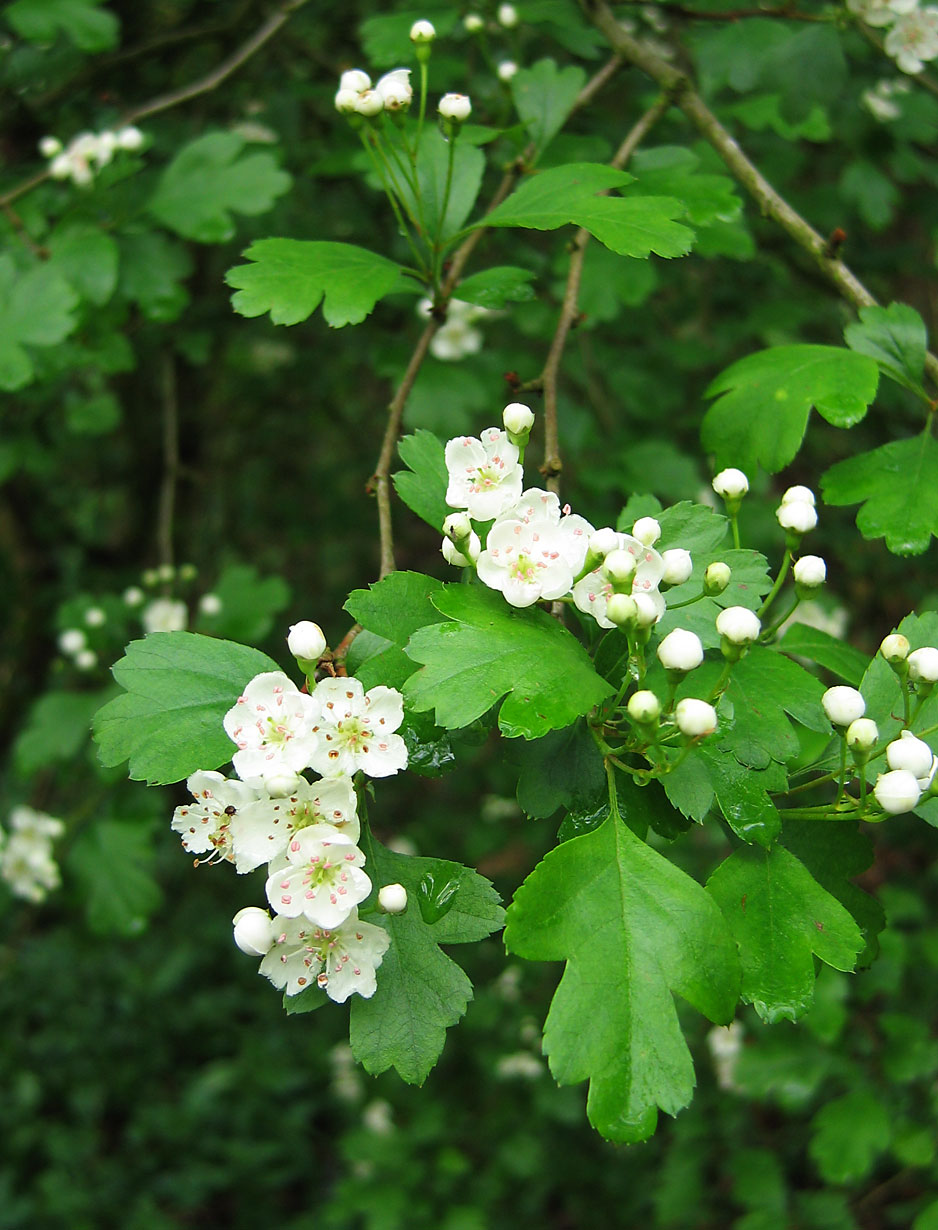

Scientific classification
- Kingdom: Plantae
- Clade: Tracheophytes
- Clade: Angiosperms
- Clade: Eudicots
- Clade: Rosids
- Order: Rosales
- Family: Rosaceae
- Genus: Crataegus
- Section: Crataegus sect. Crataegus
- Series: Crataegus ser. Crataegus
- Species: C. × media

Binomial name
- Crataegus × media Bechst.

= Crataegus × media =

Species of hawthorn

Crataegus × media, is a hybrid between two species in the genus Crataegus (hawthorn), C. monogyna and C. laevigata, both in series Crataegus. Under the rules of botanical nomenclature the name C. × media covers all intermediate forms between the two parent species, including backcrosses.

Horticulturally significant forms of C. × media include some with double pink or red flowers, including 'Paul's scarlet' and 'Rubra Plena'.
