= Dendrophilia (paraphilia) =

Sexual attraction to trees

Dendrophilia (or less often arborphilia or dendrophily) literally means "love of trees". The term may sometimes refer to a paraphilia in which people are attracted to or sexually aroused by trees. This may involve sexual contact or veneration as phallic symbols or both. Andrew Marvell made poetry using dendrophilic themes.

== See also ==
- Antholagnia, a sexual attraction to flowers
- List of paraphilias

== Bibliography ==
- Corsini, Raymond J. (1999). The Dictionary of Psychology. Psychology Press, p. 263. ISBN 1-58391-028-X.
- Love, Brenda (1992). The Encyclopedia of Unusual Sex Practices. Barricade Books, NY. ISBN 1-56980-011-1.
- Gregor, Thomas (1987). Anxious Pleasures: The Sexual Lives of an Amazonian People. University of Chicago Press. ISBN 9780226307435
