= Sexuality and disability =

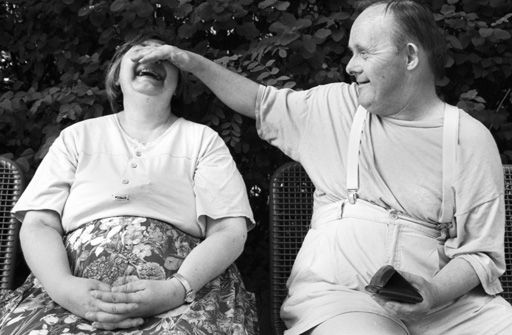
Caressing between people with Down syndrome

Sexuality and disability is a topic regarding the sexual behavior and practices of people with disabilities. Like the general population, individuals with disabilities exhibit a wide range of sexual desires and adopt diverse methods of expressing their sexuality. It is a widespread concern, however, that many people with disabilities do not receive comprehensive sex education, which could otherwise positively contribute to their sexual lives. This stems from the idea that people with disabilities are asexual in nature and are not sexually active. Although some people with disabilities identify as asexual, generalizing this label to all such individuals is a misconception. Many people with disabilities lack rights and privileges that would enable them to have intimacy and relationships. When it comes to sexuality and disability there is a sexual discourse that surrounds it. The intersection of sexuality and disability is often associated with victimization, abuse, and purity, although having a disability does not change someone's sexuality, nor does it change their desire to express it.

For physical disabilities that change a person's sexual functioning, such as spinal cord injury, there are methods that assist where needed. An individual with disabilities may enjoy sex with the help of sex toys and physical aids (such as bed modifications), by finding suitable sex positions, or through the services provided by a sex worker.

== History ==
Much of the sexual biases in the United States are traced back to Puritan ethics. Issues on the acceptance of sexuality and disability root back to 2000 years. The review of history on sexuality in philosophy, religion, and science leads to the modern day views on sexuality and disability. Religious institutions were the first entities to combat sexuality. They believed that sex was a sin and should not be practiced unless it was done with intents of reproducing. Then doctors began developing medical views on sex. Sexual pleasure was deemed a sickness. The taboo around sexuality being a disease and sin restricted many people from expressing their sexuality, especially people with disabilities.

After much groundbreaking research, it was not until the 20th century that sex and pleasure became normalized. With the normalization of sex, pleasure became the main focus. Healthy sex meant a good performance that led into an orgasm. If a person was not able to orgasm during sex they were seen as inadequate for sexual intercourse. With this a sex therapist would help the individual explore oral sex, and clitoral orgasm. When a person with a disability is not able to achieve an orgasm it was not seen as problematic, because they did not have sexual desires. The neglect on the sexual lives of people with disabilities roots from the idea that they are childlike and asexual. Because people with disabilities do not fall under the category of being sexual, there were no resources for them to seek sexual assistance.

Over the years sexually disenfranchised groups were working towards sexual acceptance for all people, including queer and disabled communities. The work of these groups began to open doors for people with disabilities to become more expressive of their sexuality. Even with these new found opportunities, sexual pleasure for people with disabilities remained unspoken of.

== Self-image ==
Having a disability may sometimes create an emotional or psychological burden for the individual with disabilities. They may feel inhibition about pursuing relationships, fearing rejection on the basis that they have a disability. Self-image may suffer as a result of disfigurement, or lack of confidence. A New York disabled dating service manager explains, "Sexuality, travel, mobility, pain: Everything takes on a different dimension." In The Ultimate Guide to Sex and Disability, Miriam Kaufman points out that attempting to hide a disability or minimize its existence is ultimately an added burden, encouraging readers to "come out" to themselves as having a disability, to accept their disability.

There is often fear associated with the intersection of sexuality and disability. Many people with disabilities embody a fear of being rejected due to the way they look. This hypersensitivity causes the individual with disabilities to keep interactions platonic. Author of Sex and Disability Robert McRuer studied a man with disabilities. McRuer gave insight on the individuals sexual and non-sexual encounters. This man had a belief that crossing the line into sexual encounters meant it would cause severe bodily harm for him. During a sexual encounter, the man felt very uncomfortable and could not cross the sexual boundary. This was due to his fear of being judged. This is an issue common in some people with disabilities. The "evaluative gaze" coming from others causes people with disabilities to feel judged and uncomfortable in their own bodies.

It is a common misconception that people with disabilities are insecure and have a negative self-image. A study was done on 7 adolescents with cerebral palsy, to assess their self-image. Of the group there were 3 girls and 4 boys, ranging between 12 and 17 years old. A personality inventory was conducted and the results came out to be positive. The group of adolescents with disabilities viewed themselves very positively, rating their self-image higher than norm groups. After the inventory, the interviewer Lena Adamson wrote this conclusion in her "Brief report—Self-image, Adolescence and Disability", published in the American Journal of Occupational Therapy:

The following conclusions are made: Further studies on self-image and the psychosocial development of adolescents with disabilities should (a) focus on the social interaction outside their immediate families, and (b) continue to use and develop methods where these adolescents can give voice to their own experiences and opinions.

== In contemporary society ==
Sexuality and disability research deals with how society influences the sex life and relations of persons with disabilities. The edited book by McRuer and Mollow is titled “Sex and Disability,” and it addresses this issue. According to a WHO/UNFPA report, people with disabilities need the same information on sexual and reproductive health issues as anyone else.

The areas of program design, content, delivery, and evaluation were identified as being important in conducting a review of relationship and sexuality education programs for individuals with intellectual disabilities. Program development should be based on evidence and be person-centered to include the perspectives of individuals with intellectual disabilities.

== Sexual activity ==
=== General ===
The mechanics of sex may be daunting, and communication, experimentation, medication and manual devices have been cited as important factors for sexual activity where disability is involved. Additionally, recognition of the pleasure that is derived from sexual activity beyond penetration and intercourse is also highlighted. For example, changes may take place in a person's sexuality after spinal cord injury; sensitivity to touch can increase above the lesion location in someone with a spinal injury. From research undertaken by the Christopher and Dana Reeve Foundation, orgasm was achievable for 79% of men with incomplete spinal cord injuries and 28% of men with complete injuries.

Oral sex and manual sex are other alternatives where penetration is not possible or not wanted, and wedge devices can be used to aid with positioning. Sex toys may be used as assistive devices as well; for example, vibrators can be used to provide extra stimulation and in circumstances where hand mobility is impaired. Other supportive devices include manual stimulation pumps, for erection promotion and maintenance, and "sex furniture", whereby rail or clamp enhancements, or specialised designs facilitate sexual activity.

Writer Faiza Siddiqui sustained a serious brain injury that led to a decrease in her sexual drive and the loss of her ability to orgasm, with the latter most likely the result of damage to Siddiqui's hypothalamus. Siddiqui explained her learning process in relation to sexual activity following the accident in a 2013 article:

I had to clear away all the thoughts I had about my imperfect body ... Since then, I've started to feel less shame about my unresponsive body ... My brain can't concentrate on as many things anymore, so I have to focus more on every little twinge and the lightest of touches. Surely that's going to mean better sex? I can't say that the sex is exactly better – I can't be on top anymore – but I'm learning that it doesn't really matter ... I had to grow up. Growing up is something that we're all having to do.

Some people with a spinal cord injury are able to "transfer their orgasm" using sexual energy to any part of the body that has sensation. For example, Rafe Biggs acquired a spinal cord injury in 2004. Through his work with a sexologist he discovered during a massage that when his thumb was being massaged, it felt very similar to his penis. It was through this experience that he learned that he could transfer his orgasm, using tantric energy, to his penis. Kenneth Ray Stubbs also has a spinal cord injury and is able to use tantric bodywork to obtain an "orgasmic feeling". If a person is able to use sexual energy correctly then they would be able to experience an orgasm in any part of the body that is capable of feeling sensation.

=== Fetishes and BDSM ===
Sexuality for people with disabilities is often linked to fetishes and "freakish excess".

- Abasiophilia is when an individual's sexual arousal is dependent on a sexual partner with a disability. The obsession is most common for people with disabilities who wear leg braces.
- Apotemnophilia is self demanded amputation.

Apotemnophilia is when an individual amputates their own limb for sexual pleasure. A case research done in the Journal of Sex Research states "Apotemnophillia is related to erotization of the stump and to overachievement despite a handicap." Little is known about the relationship between sexual pleasure and amputated limbs. Apotemnophilia was first introduced to the public in the magazine Penthouse in late 1972. The fetish was brought up by a young man with a disability who practices this fetish. After reading his accounts some editors of the magazine related with this feelings and published his story.

Some individuals who have this fetish have made successful amputation attempts. For those who want to be amputated but do not have the means or strength to do so, are able to get professional assistance.

- Devotism is the sexual attraction someone has for a person with disabilities

Sex and disability does not only have an unattractive connotation. Sex and Disability writer Robert McRuer found that Devotism had renewed self-assurance in a group of women with disabilities. He writes, "Women who had felt profound shame about their bodies reported significant gains in their self-confidence after discovering devotees." This empowerment has led to positive changes in the women's behavior. It has been reported by Robert McRuer that because of this, some women with disabilities are more confident in their self-image and do not hide their disabilities as they previously have.

People who have a devotism fetish are referred to as Devotees. Robert McRuer argues that devoteeism relies on disgust and desire. The description of the devotees' desire come from an ableist assumption that disabled bodies are disgusting. It is typical for a devotees to view themselves as the only people who are sexually attracted to amputees. This belief establishes a ground for Devotees exceptionalism.

BDSM is a topic in the sex and disability culture. It has been described as empowering for people with disabilities because of their acceptance of non-normative bodies. BDSM could be used as a way to control pain for people with chronic pain. Artist Bob Flanagan used BDSM to help him cope with his cystic fibrosis. His ability to control his own pain excited him as he was known to push himself as far as he could. "I was making a mockery out of something serious that had happened to me," said Flanagan when making light of his pain related to cystic fibrosis. He created a traveling museum exhibit called "Visiting Hours" that showed the intersectionality of cystic fibrosis and sadism and masochism. In the exhibit, "Visiting Hours", museumgoers would experience an environment that was a combination of a children's residential hospital and a BDSM torture chamber. The purpose of this exhibit was to portray Flanagan's pain through a pleasurable lens showing that BDSM could offer some sexual healing.

Women and girls with disabilities are a common focus in fetishism due to their immobility. This makes them especially vulnerable to sexual abuse.

=== Sex work ===
In February 2013, it was reported that citizens with disabilities in the Netherlands were eligible for a government-funded scheme that provided funds to cover up to 12 occasions of sexual service per year. During the same period, Chris Fulton, a campaigner in the UK with cerebral palsy and muscular dystrophy, called upon the UK government to also provide financial support for sexual services for people with disabilities. Fulton explained:

The idea is to give people with disabilities more of a choice. There's still a lot of stigma attached [to people with disabilities having relationships] from research I've done and experiences I've had. I think it would be good to bring the Dutch scheme over here to take away that stigma about people with disabilities having sex. But it's not just about that. It's about people with disabilities being accepted when they have relationships ... It needs to be brought out into the open in a managed and constructive way.

In early 2013, former brothel owner Becky Adams spoke with the media about her intention to open a non-profit brothel exclusively for people with disabilities in the UK, which, if launched in 2014, will be the nation's first legal initiative of this nature. Adams stated that she will invest £60,000 into the brothel following a stroke in 2009—Adams explained that after the stroke, her "eyes were suddenly opened. I was utterly unaware that such a big group was suffering so enormously." If she is approved for a permit, Adams plans to open a two-room service in Milton Keynes, near London, that will be staffed by sex workers and assistants.

Adams also founded the Para-Doxies service in 2012, which connects people with disabilities throughout the UK with sex workers—at the time, Adams ran the service on a completely voluntary, non-profit basis. In April 2013, the service was receiving over 500 enquiries a week from men, women and couples, and was struggling to cope with the demand.

A 2011 Australian documentary directed by Catherine Scott, Scarlet Road, explores another aspect of sexuality and disabilities through the life of a sex worker who has specialized for 18 years in a clientele who have disabilities. In 2012, the topic was highlighted in a fictional film based on the real life experience of writer Mark O'Brien. The Sessions portrays the relationship between O'Brien, who survived polio as a child, and a "sexual surrogate" to whom he loses his virginity. A member of the British Polio Fellowship states that post-polio syndrome, which affects polio survivors later in life, is a little-known condition that could have been explored in the film.

A survey conducted by the Disability Now magazine in 2005 found that 19% of female participants would see trained sex workers, compared with 63% of the male respondents. Tuppy Owens, sex therapist and disability professional, explained in 2013 that disabled women "don't trust male sex workers to be honourable".

== LGBTQ ==
LGBTQ people with disabilities face double marginalization. Individuals with disabilities are often either viewed as nonsexual or hypersexual. Because of these misconceptions it is hard to find LGBTQ people with disabilities portrayed in healthy sexual lives. In recent decades, scholars have worked to include disabilities studies in queer theory, with the intention of normalizing disability in LGBTQ spaces. Queer and disabled liberation starts with the rejection of historic ideas on sexuality and disability.

It is also rare to have a LGBTQ person with disabilities portrayed in media. Some movies and literature do exist for the LGBTQ disabled communities such as:

- Akers, Michael D. (director). 2012. Morgan (film). United Gay Network

This movie is about a bicyclist who gets in an accident and becomes paraplegic. After the bicyclist recovers from his injuries, he comes to terms with his sexuality and falls in love with a man.

- Alland, Sandra (filmmaker). 2013–2014. I'm Not Your Inspiration (documentary film series)

This is a short documentary series documenting the lives of LGBTQ people with disabilities.

- Bose, Shonali (director). 2014. Margarita, With a Straw (film).

This is a film about a young Indian woman with cerebral palsy who relocates to America for her undergraduate education. The movie follows her complex romantic relationship with a blind woman.

== Relationships ==
Disabled individuals' access to sexual and emotional partners is restricted by society's de-eroticization of their sexuality. The experiences of individuals with disabilities has shown that the basic human need to form close relationships is as relevant for individuals with disabilities as it is for humans without a disability. Furthermore, the social networks of people with disabilities can be small and this restricts the ability to form new relationships. Society's view of disability also puts pressure of individuals with disabilities in finding relationships. Even though our society has made great strides with creating a more accepting world, individuals with disabilities are still seen as outsiders. Parents prevent their children from asking individuals with disabilities questions which results in them viewing people with disabilities as "other". While the majority of non-disabled people meet other people in public spaces, there are many physical and social barriers. The inaccessibility of public spaces (whether it be stairs, an absence of menus written in braille, or no ASL interpreters) could make it difficult for an individual with disabilities to go out.

Disability stereotypes add to the difficulty and stigma experienced by individuals with disabilities. The following myths about individuals with disabilities have been identified:

- Individuals with disabilities do not need sex to be happy.
- Individuals with disabilities are not sexually attractive.
- Individuals with disabilities are "oversexed".
- Individuals with disabilities have more important needs than sex.
- Individuals with disabilities do not need sex education.
- Individuals with disabilities cannot have "real sex".
- Individuals with disabilities, particularly those with intellectual disabilities, should not have children and should not be allowed to have children.

According to one survey, up to 50% of adults with disabilities are not in any sexual relationship at all. Online dating sites specifically aimed at individuals with disabilities have been founded to fill this void.

Misconceptions from the broader community have been raised as a prominent issue for individuals with disabilities in terms of their own relationships. The head of a disabled dating service explained in 2010 that in terms of dating, people with disability had "different preferences" like non-disabled people, while in a 2012 Sydney Morning Herald article, the mother of a man with cerebral palsy explained that in terms of sexuality and people with disability, "people see them sitting in their wheelchair [and] think, that's it."

== Oppression ==
There is a long history of seclusion and segregation that has affected society's view of people with disabilities. People with disabilities were often put in institutions against their will because they were deemed "weak" and "feeble minded". While they were in the institutions they would often experience forced sterilization, including vasectomies, salpingectomy, and other procedures. None of these were considered dangerous to the person in the institution. In 1927, the United States Supreme Court case of Buck v. Bell stated that it was permissible to sterilize some people with disabilities against their will. It also stated in the decision that that did not violate the Fourteenth Amendment to the United States Constitution. However, in Olmstead v. L.C., 527 U.S. 581 (1999), the Supreme Court of the United States held that under the Americans with Disabilities Act, individuals with mental disabilities have the right to live in the community rather than in institutions if, in the words of the opinion of the Court, "the State's treatment professionals have determined that community placement is appropriate, the transfer from institutional care to a less restrictive setting is not opposed by the affected individual, and the placement can be reasonably accommodated, taking into account the resources available to the State and the needs of others with mental disabilities."

According to a series of interviews taken place in Malta investigating the sexual lives of men and women with intellectual disabilities, most individuals reported that they felt oppressed by the expectations from families and caretakers to not engage in sexual activity or a relationship. As a result of the study, almost all individuals expressed a desire to be able to talk openly about their relationships and spend more time away from the family. And while all people's sexualities are controlled and limited by social norms, people with disabilities feel that they are limited by further factors. Another study in Texas explored the beliefs of the families and caretakers of people with intellectual disabilities on their sexualities. The results revealed that the majority of families and caretakers of those with intellectual disabilities believed that those with disabilities should not engage in sexual activity because of the fear that they will be taken advantage of.

== Sexual harassment, assault, and domestic violence ==
People with disabilities are more vulnerable to sexual assault than the general public, being targeted due to the physical or mental impairments that they have. The American Journal of Preventive Medicine has published results of a survey that found that males with disabilities are 4 times more likely to be sexually abused. Other studies have shown that for women with disabilities, "regardless of age, race, ethnicity, sexual orientation, or class [they] are assaulted, raped, and abused at a rate two times greater than women without disabilities[... The] risk of being physically assaulted for an adult with developmental disabilities is 4–10 times higher than for other adults."

It is estimated that 25% of both girls and boys with disabilities will experience sexual abuse before the age of 18. It is also estimated that 20% of these incidents are reported. These rates are much higher than sexual abuse incidents pertaining to nondisabled children. There is a 1 in 4 chance that a girl with developmental disabilities will be molested before the age of 18. This is 10 times higher than the nondisabled population. During the California Committee on Abuse of Person with Disabilities, national statistics estimate the sexual abuse on people with disabilities as such:

By combining national statistics with specific studies, estimate ranges are as follows: between 39% and 83% of girls with developmental disabilities, and between 16% and 32% of boys with developmental disabilities will be subjected to sexual abuse before the age of 18 years. Incidence of sexual abuse among the population of persons with developmental disabilities was estimated in 1985 by the California State Department of Developmental Services to be 70%.

A majority of the predators are documented to be the father or stepfather of the victim. This is especially true for females with developmental disabilities. It is estimated that 10% of girls with intellectual disabilities are victims of incest. Females are most likely to be victims of sexual abuse. Studies show 50% of disabled females have experience multiple incidents of sexual abuse and 80% of disabled males experienced 1 incident. The numbers for sexual abuse are so high because the perpetrators are well known to the individual, such as a parent, uncle, aunt, cousin, friend, caretaker or sibling.

The statistics on sexual abuse for people with disabilities are also high because staff and dependent parents are not adequately trained in identifying sexual abuse. Many staff believe that sexual abuse must be proven before it is reported. The issue with this is that certain disabilities restrict the individual from expressing the experience. Adults with training in identifying abuse are more effective in protecting the child. Most programs focus on "stranger danger", which is not effective because most sexual abuse assaults come from the individual's inner circle.

=== Prevention ===
Several prevention programs against sexual abuse for people with disabilities exist in the United States. In Seattle, a program called Seattle Project trains individuals with developmental disabilities to prevent sexual assault. In Minnesota, the Department of Corrections created a prevention program where children and adults with disabilities are trained in all aspects of abuse prevention. California's Waters Child Abuse Prevention Training Act (WCBTA) program attempts to provide all children with abuse prevention. Each program caters to the child's age and learning level. In Contra Costa County, the WCBTA focuses on the needs of various disabilities and sexual abuse prevention. Los Angeles County Office of Education has created a Preschool Abuse Prevention Program for children with disabilities in which teachers are instructed to train students with disabilities on physical, emotional, and sexual abuse.

== Organizations ==
=== Australia ===
The subject of the Scarlet Road documentary, Rachel Wotton, also co-founded and helps run Touching Base, an organization based in New South Wales, Australia that provides information, education and support for clients with disabilities, sex workers and Disability Service Providers. The organization has been active since October 2000 following the formation of the founding committee that consisted of disability and health organization representatives. Wotton explains, "I am a sex worker and I make my money from clients seeing me. Some clients just happen to have a disability." Initially, the organization was receiving around one weekly phone call, but by 2012, inquiries were daily.

In March 2014, former Australian High Court judge Michael Kirby became a patron of the organization, joining four other inaugural patrons: Eva Cox, Professor Basil Donovan, Associate Professor Helen Meekosha, and NSW Local Government elder statesman Peter Woods. Following his appointment, Kirby stated: "If you deny sexual expression to human beings, cut them off from that aspect of their personalities and of their happiness, then you end up with a lot of very frustrated and very unhappy people", and he praised Touching Base for recognising that people with disabilities need "to have opportunities for sexual expression".

People with Disability Australia has developed a sex and relationship education workshop for people with intellectual disabilities.

=== United Kingdom ===
- TLC Trust

The TLC Trust provides a web-based service that facilitates the provision of sexual services—sex workers, therapists, and teachers—for people with disabilities, including a phone call appointment-booking service for those people with speech impairments or care workers who are unable to organize such services for clients due to the policy of their employer. The TLC Trust was founded in 2000 at a Sexual Freedom Coalition Conference and the website was initially run by James Palmer, a man with disabilities. The organization has garnered praise from sex educator and performance artist Annie Sprinkle, and academic and writer A.C. Grayling.

- Outsiders

Founded by Owens, Outsiders is primarily an international social club for people with disabilities, but the organization also runs the Sex and Disability Helpline, a telephone support service for people with disabilities that is staffed by both people with disabilities and health professionals. Outsiders is supported by the Outsiders Trust, which consists of a board of trustees that assists with the management of matters such as finances and projects.

- Sexual Health and Disability Alliance (SHADA)

The Sexual Health and Disability Alliance, also founded by Owens, was first started to provide a forum in which all of the UK's disability helpline operators, and others, could meet and discuss their work. The individuals who were initially involved state that they were "eager to improve the sex-positive work we do" and the Alliance was eventually formalized in 2008 with a mission to "bring together health professionals who work with people with disabilities to empower and support them in their sex and relationship needs." The Alliance does not charge a fee for those interested in becoming members and meets biannually in London. It held its first conference in 2009 at the Royal Society of Medicine.

- The Disabilities Trust

The Disabilities Trust is over 30 years old and is a leading charitable organization in the UK. It states that it provides "residential and day services to meet the needs of individuals with Autism, Brain Injury, Physical Disability and Learning Disability", as well as helping people to live at home in the community. The Trust has produced written information on sexuality and disability, which are freely available on the Internet.

=== United States ===
- Reach Out USA

Reach out USA is an advocacy organization that focuses on the relationship between disability and LGBT concerns. The group's goal is to influence disabled communities to be more aware of the LGBT communities, and LGBT communities and organizations to be more accountable and welcoming of disabled communities. Reach Out USA helps out with other topics such as mental illness, suicide, depression and much more.

- Queerability

Queerability is an LGBT and disabled rights advocacy group that is run by LGBT people with disabilities who hope to increase visibility to the community. Queerability does not only advocate for the rights of LGBT disabled communities, but also provides educational sources pertaining to the individuals sexuality and disability. Some of the sources they provide include: How to Meet, Date, and Have Sex When You're Disabled, Practical Sex Tips for people with disabilities, Good Sex Positions for Disabled Sex, Talking About Sensitive Topics and more.

=== France ===
The idea of sexual support emerged in 2007, when a conference on "Physical dependence: intimacy and sexuality" was organised by Marcel Nuss. The Strasbourg conference is co-organised by Handicap International, the Association des Paralyés de France (APF), the French Muscular Dystrophy Association (AFM) and the Coordination Handicap et Autonomie (CHA).

In France there are several structures that now provide training for sex assistants: the Swiss association Sexualité et Handicap Pluriels (SEHP), the Association for the Promotion of Sexual Support (APPAS), founded by Marcel Nuss, which is organising its first training cycle in 2015, and the association Corps Solidaires, which brings together certified sex assistants.

== See also ==
- Attraction to disability
- Disability and women's health
- Disability rights movement
- Neuroqueer theory
- New Mobility magazine
- Sexual abuse and intellectual disability
- Sexuality after spinal cord injury
- Sexuality in older age
