= Nina de Vries =

Dutch sexual assistant (born 1961)

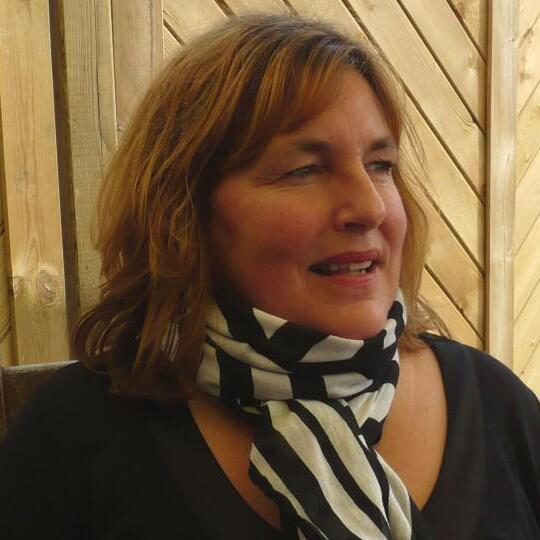
- Born: 21 January 1961 (age 65); IJmuiden, Netherlands

Nina de Vries (born 21 January 1961 in IJmuiden, the Netherlands) is a Dutch sexual assistant who has lived and worked in Germany since 1990. She distinguishes between Sexual Assistance and Surrogate Partnership, terms which are commonly used interchangeably. Over the years her focus has shifted to the work with severely disabled people as well as the education and training of sexual assistants. In addition, she is responsible for elderly care facilities and facilities in which people with different kinds of impairments have found a new home.

== Education and early work ==
Nina de Vries is a child of politically engaged parents. Already at an early age she was familiar with the concept of Amnesty International and Protests against the Vietnam War. Her father was a teacher, her mother a housewife. Her mother took her own life when de Vries was 16 years old – a "moment that markedly shaped the path of her life." When she was 17 years old and feeling vulnerable after her mother's death, she saw a report on Dutch television about so-called "sex helpers". Deeply touched, it reminded her of clown doctors who try to bring some joy to dying children. She did not know that this encounter with people who face some human beings' problems would become an impetus for her, and that she would become a fighter for the sexual self-determination of those who can not help themselves.

Nina de Vries attended primary school in Amersfoort. She graduated from high school in Arnhem in 1979 and then studied social work in Leeuwarden. For several years she lived and worked in a Buddhist-oriented community, but later distanced herself from this spirituality. However, Buddhist elements continue to flow into her work. While still in the Netherlands, she trained in bodywork and sexual education.

In 1990 Nina de Vries moved to Berlin and later to Potsdam where she has been living and working, unless her expertise is in demand elsewhere. Initially she was active artistically, engaging in graphic arts and sculpture, among other areas. In 1992 she began working as an educator in a rehabilitation center where she worked for a year. This brought her into contact with disabled people for the first time. In January 2017 she gave an interview about her work in English.

== Career ==
Nina de Vries is considered a "pioneer of sexual assistance". At the end of the 1990s she began her work as a sexual assistant and has continued to gain expertise since then. She sees her most important teachers as those who use her services.

When I meet my clients, I want to get to know them. I do not want to perceive them as victims and pity them, but to meet them at a level of equals. […] Many efforts that are made with the intent to contribute to issues of inclusion arise partly from pity and guilt. You have to drive around the area in a wheelchair for a day, then you will realize where we really stand socially.

— Nina de Vries, Berliner Zeitung

Currently de Vries' clients are primarily people with multiple disabilities, with autism as well as persons who have significant cognitive or dementia disorders. In addition, de Vries is engaged in training others to achieve quality standards. She believes that flexibility, sensitivity, respect and truthfulness are indispensable values in her work. Furthermore, on behalf of the Center for Disability and Sexuality (German: Fachstelle für Behinderung und Sexualität, FABS) in Basel, she trained ten sex therapists of both genders for six months. She also offers coaching to organizations dedicated to the sexual self-determination of people.

De Vries is regularly asked by various institutions to give lectures or workshops on the topics of Sexuality and Disability or Sexuality and Aging. Research associations are involved, as are facilities for disabled people, and nursing homes which are beginning to approach this largely taboo subject. Requests for her expertise come mostly from Germany, Austria and Switzerland. At the 4th Congress for the Care of the Elderly in 2010, she gave an interview which is available on YouTube.

When De Vries began to work in the field of Sexual Assistance and Education she was "surprised" by the response in Germany as she knew that "in the Netherlands there is more open-mindedness. 'Sex Helpers' have been active there since the seventies. Here it is taboo until today." In Germany, as opposed to the Netherlands, "very few questions are being asked". This is beginning to change. The Federal Centre for Health Education (BZgA) is funding a research project led by Sven Jennessen of the University of Koblenz-Landau in cooperation with the Catholic University of North Rhine-Westphalia (German: Katholische Hochschule Nordrhein-Westphalen) and the Protestant University of Applied Sciencices (German: Evangelische Hochschule Bochum) in Bochum to examine the question "how disabled people in facilities can express their sexual self-determination".

== Sexual assistance ==
The attempt to provide assistance to people who need specific help with their sexuality due to various impairments has produced a new occupational profile that de Vries calls Sexual Accompaniment or Sexual Assistance. At the Integra Conference for Care, Therapy and Rehabilitation in Wels, Austria, where she presented her training concept, she gave a definition for this profession:

Sexual companions are women and men who – based on their own healthy and conscious motivation – help people with physical, emotional or mental impairments/disabilities experience their sexuality and make this their profession. They enable people who need a gentle, creative approach in the field of sexuality due to their situation (e.g. illness, accident, life history), giving them an intimate, sensual and erotic experience as well as a positive body feeling. […] They regard people with disabilities as equals.

— Nina de Vries, lecture 2006

Sexual assistance is an "opportunity to experience". With these simple words de Vries describes her profession, stating that with such assistance a paid sexual service is offered, similar to prostitution. She believes, however, that the attitude with which this service is provided is different. It is, if possible, an assist for self-help. In contrast to prostitution, intensive personal relationships are necessary not only with the clientele, but also with the persons who care for them. De Vries is convinced that these relationships create special preconditions for the profession and should be taken into account in the training. Such training took place, for the first time, when de Vries trained sex assistants at the Institute for Self-Determination of the Disabled (German: Institut zur Selbst-Bestimmung Behinderter (ISBB)) in 2002.

Some of her colleagues call themselves 'touchers', which sounds more poetic, less like prostitution. Nina de Vries has no shyness at this point. 'What I do is a sexual service as well as prostitution, although there are, of course, differences. I am nothing better', she says. The deep conviction of not being better is something like the basic pillar of her work, even in dealing with her clients.

— Jörg Böckem, Spiegel Online

De Vries sees the difference between Sexual Assistance and Surrogate Partnership at different levels. On one hand, she perceives a sexual assistant not as a substitute partner for the client, but rather someone offering a very personal, individually designed relationship. It is different from a love affair. Nina de Vries calls this an "encounter" – with people "who are not scheming because they are not able to be scheming." On the other hand, sexual assistance does not pursue any therapeutic goals, but aims to help people who can not express themselves without help make decisions about sexual self-determination.

The self-determination of her clientele is in the foreground. "If someone just wants to have my hand on his stomach for an hour, that's okay. For an autistic person to allow that can be a high accomplishment."

== Publications ==
- de Vries, Nina (2009). Lust leben statt Leiden schaffen – Sexualassistenz für Menschen mit einer Beeinträchtigung. Orientierung (in German). Vol. 2 ("stattlich, prächtig, stark bewegt" – Voller Stolz und Leidenschaft ed.). Bundesverband evangelische Behindertenhilfe. Archived from the original on 2022-09-26.
- Assistance: Ewering, Ingrid; Gartinger, Silvia; Hennig, Anke; Hinderberger, Jörg; Jocham, Ulrike; Rott-König, Corina; Schmidt, Christoph (2011). Nicklas-Faust, Jeanne; Scharringhausen, Ruth (eds.). Heilerziehungspflege in besonderen Lebenslagen gestalten [Training in special living conditions]. Heilerziehungspflege (in German). Vol. 2. Berlin: Cornelsen. ISBN 978-3-06-450304-5. Archived from the original on 2016-12-20.

== See also ==
- Sexuality and disability
