= Attraction to disability =

Type of sexual attraction

Attraction to disability is a sexualised interest in the appearance, sensation and experience of disability or sexual attraction toward disabled individuals by able-bodied individuals. It may extend from normal human sexuality into a type of sexual fetishism. Sexologically, the pathological end of the attraction tends to be classified as a paraphilia. Other researchers have approached it as a form of identity disorder. The most common interests are towards amputations, prosthesis, and crutches. As a sexual fetish, attraction to disability is known as devotism, and those with the fetish are known as devotees.

== History ==
Until the 1990s, it tended to be described mostly as acrotomophilia, at the expense of other disabilities, or of the wish by some to pretend or acquire disability. Bruno (1997) systematised the attraction as factitious disability disorder. A decade on, others argue that erotic target location error is at play, classifying the attraction as an identity disorder. In the standard psychiatric reference Diagnostic and Statistical Manual of Mental Disorders, text revision (DSM-IV-tr), the fetish falls under the general category of "Sexual and Gender Identity Disorders" and the more specific category of paraphilia, or sexual fetishes; this classification is preserved in DSM-5.

== As fetish subculture ==
Desires to pretend to be disabled and acquire a disability are extensions of the pathological disorder. About half of all devotees occasionally pretend (43 percent of Nattress [1996], sample of 50). Avowed "wannabes" seem to number not more than five percent of the devotee-wannabe population, though Nattress (1996) found 22 percent of his sample of 50 had wanted to become disabled. Accordingly, Bruno (1997) considers those affected by versions of the paraphilia under the broad heading of Devotees, Pretenders, and Wannabes (DPWs), as used here.

Well over half of DPWs have felt this pathological attraction since childhood, as typical in paraphilias. The Amelotatist (see § General references) found that 75 percent of its sample of 195 were aware of the attraction by age fifteen. Those attracted often cherish early memories of a sexuoerotic tragedy (a "first sighting") involving an object of their future attention, often an older member of the opposite sex, as stereotypical in paraphilic etiology. About a quarter report discovering the paraphilia in puberty and a few in maturity.

The aforesaid has given grounds for the attraction to disability to be represented as the continuum Bruno (1997) termed factitious disability disorder. At its less-intense devotee end, there is sexualised fascination with the existential aspects of disability and its appearance. In its middle pretending area is strong desire to reproduce the sensations of disability. At its intense wannabe end is an imperative to acquire a disability which may prompt self-harm.

According to DPW fetishists, their attraction does not appear to pose dangers to DPWs' partners or third parties. However, it can be noted that the DSM-IV includes this paraphilia within the diagnostic criteria of psychiatric pathology. Fetishists raise objections to the characterization of their preference as an aberrant pathology. However, objections have also been raised by members of the disability community on the grounds that such fetishes objectify and dehumanize them. Some people with disabilities willingly participate in the fetish subculture, for example, contributing model photos (e.g., Debbie van der Putten).

== In relationships ==
The Amelotatist found that 55 percent of a sample of 195 DPWs had dated disabled people, 40 percent had been sexually intimate with disabled partners, and 5 percent had current disabled spouses. Nattress (1993) found that 41 percent of a sample of 50 DPWs had, or were in, relationships with disabled partners.

Relationships between DPWs and disabled people tend to be reported as being ordinary, the attraction being sated by the fact of the partner's disability. It appears that the attraction to disability is undisclosed in a proportion of DPW-disabled relationships. DPWs may press disabled partners to put their disabilities to the fore in intimate situations and exhibit them in social ones. Sexually, some DPWs have been reported to engage in active tactile observation as much as in intercourse.

That DPWs find it hard to satisfy both sexual and emotional needs is borne out in findings by both Nattress (1996) and Dixon (1983). They report that, despite reasonable success in obtaining sexual contact with disabled people, just 21 percent of DPWs had had long-term relationships with disabled partners.

About half of DPWs fail to establish relationships with disabled people. "Second-best" options for them are relationships with pretenders and wannabes. Practically all DPWs have experience of relationships with non-disabled partners. Such relationships are also reported to be ordinary despite the (mostly undisclosed) attraction to disability on the part of one partner.

Although it is not common knowledge within mainstream communities, the internet has revolutionized the process by which DPWs can meet each other while pursuing meaningful relationships. Some of these individuals, however, have expressed a level of concern when it comes to their first face to face encounters. While most of these encounters are completely safe, there are important guidelines to provide a sense of security to either party who may feel vulnerable.

== Explanations ==
Psychology views sadism and masochism as interchangeable, with voyeurism and exhibitionism as their respective aspects. Devotees' observation-based behavior and preference for display-minded partners seem to support explanations 2 to 4. Devotee pornography tends to display the appearance of disability across a range of activities rather than focus on sexual situations.

Recent neuroscientific research suggests that apotemnophilia has a neurological basis.

=== Sexological ===
Contemporary sexology does not consider the attraction problematic unless exercising it infringes the rights of one of the parties and/or those of third parties. Explanations include:

1. Imprinting or the influence of influential events on behaviour. Encountering visibly disabled people in childhood awakes strong emotions which may give rise to quasi-logical reasoning and a desire for people with the type of trauma encountered. Care received during hospital stays may awaken a wish to become disabled (as a way of ensuring continuous care), later projected onto others. Freud is credited with discovering conditioning ("imprinting" in sexology) in the context of fetishism;
2. Implied parental approval: if, on encountering someone disabled, a future DPW's parents express admiration, the child may conclude that disability inspires regard, later ranking it among sexual preferences. This is among explanations mentioned by Dr John Money in Lovemaps;
3. Flight from pressure: strict parenting and/or onerous peer environments may cause the future devotee to seek respite in sickness and disability. With time, the wish to become disabled is "projected" onto others. The analogy with Munchausen Syndrome (simulating or inducing illness as a route to compassion and benefits) here is reasonably clear in wannabes. In them, projection has failed, leaving them to see themselves as more attractive if disabled. The fact that most DPWs feel the attraction since childhood also backs the above explanations. There are also suggestions that there are more DPWs in America, Europe, and the Far East due to specific parent/peer-driven achievement models there. This is another explanation mentioned in Lovemaps;
4. Inferiority complex causing projection: DPWs may have been made to feel inferior in childhood and may project their ambitions onto disabled people, who perforce have to overcome many barriers;
5. 'Darwinism': DPWs see disabled people as proven in natural selection, having cheated death and overcome adversity;
6. The unknown: children experience fascination with and fear of the unknown when encountering a disabled person. As adolescents, they may experience similar emotions when first approaching the opposite sex. This fascination with alienness may become associated with arousal over time through classical conditioning. Eventually, arousal will be triggered by the emotion;
7. "The missing phallus": When exposed to the nude female body, some men are fascinated by the fact that "the penis is missing", and there is an alternative and sexual organ (in fact, one reminiscent of a wound) in its place. This feeling of surprise may become a part of sexual attraction. The sight of a missing limb may evoke a similar feeling. Similar to 6 above, this explanation was proposed by Dr Anne Hooper in 1978;
8. Attention seeking and envy: Since disabled people tend to draw more than average attention, children observing them may conclude that one has to be disabled to enjoy attention. In puberty, disability would be included in their attractiveness criteria.
9. Erotic target location error: The desire of some male transvestites and transsexuals to assume the appearance of their sexual ideal was transposed by analogy to amputee wannabes by First (2005), who backs his claim with research by himself and others since 2000. Since the condition of some wannabes appears not to be primarily sexual (except by association), the explanation defines the attraction to disability as an identity disorder. It is put forward within the narrow context of amputee wannabes, and the author does not address the DPW continuum discussed above. The wannabe community has always defined itself in terms very similar to those First and Lawrence (2006) use, with the indigenous label "transabled" gaining ground by 2005 at the expense of "wannabe."

=== By DPWs ===
The DPW community constantly debates the origins of the attraction ("the Why?"). The Amelotatist, reporting a poll of 195 devotees was a community contribution and the first synthesis of explanations. A 2005 straw poll in two DPW fora revealed that in childhood many respondents (often first or only children) felt alienated from peers, forming solitary interests in inter alia, transportation, or collecting. These feelings may indicate that empathy with disabled people, subject to exclusion in most cultures, is among the motivations for the attraction.

== In media ==
- Quid Pro Quo features a secret subculture of able-bodied people who want to be paraplegic.
- In Pumpkin, a sorority girl is drawn to a disabled man.
- Boxing Helena is a feature film concerning amputee fetishism.
- American Horror Story: Freak Show features Elsa Mars (Jessica Lange), a German woman who had her legs amputated in an acrotomophilic film while working as a prostitute in Weimar, Germany.
- Katawa Shoujo is a visual novel based on dating disabled girls.
- Dexter is a TV show in which a serial killer prosthetist is attracted to amputation.

== See also ==
- Abasiophilia – the fascination for disabled people who use leg-braces or other orthopaedic appliances
- Agalmatophilia – the desire for mannequins or for statue-like immobility, feigned or caused by illness or paralysis
- Acrotomophilia – the desire for partners with missing limbs
- Apotemnophilia – the desire to acquire a disability ("wannabeism," "transability", "transabled"); Body integrity identity disorder (BIID)
- Body dysmorphic disorder – the pathological dislike of one's own physique for subjective reasons
- Body modification – the deliberate altering of physique for non-medical reasons
- Handicap principle – possible analogue from the animal kingdom
- Legbrace fetishism – the desire for partners who use leg braces; an aspect of abasiophilia
- Medical fetishism – a sexualised interest in observing medical practice and receiving medical treatment
- Munchhausen's syndrome – those affected by this psychological disorder feign illness and/or cause themselves self-harm
- Sexual assistance - support for people with functional diversity so that they can have sexual access to their own body
