= Marcel Nuss =

French essayist and activist (1955–2024)

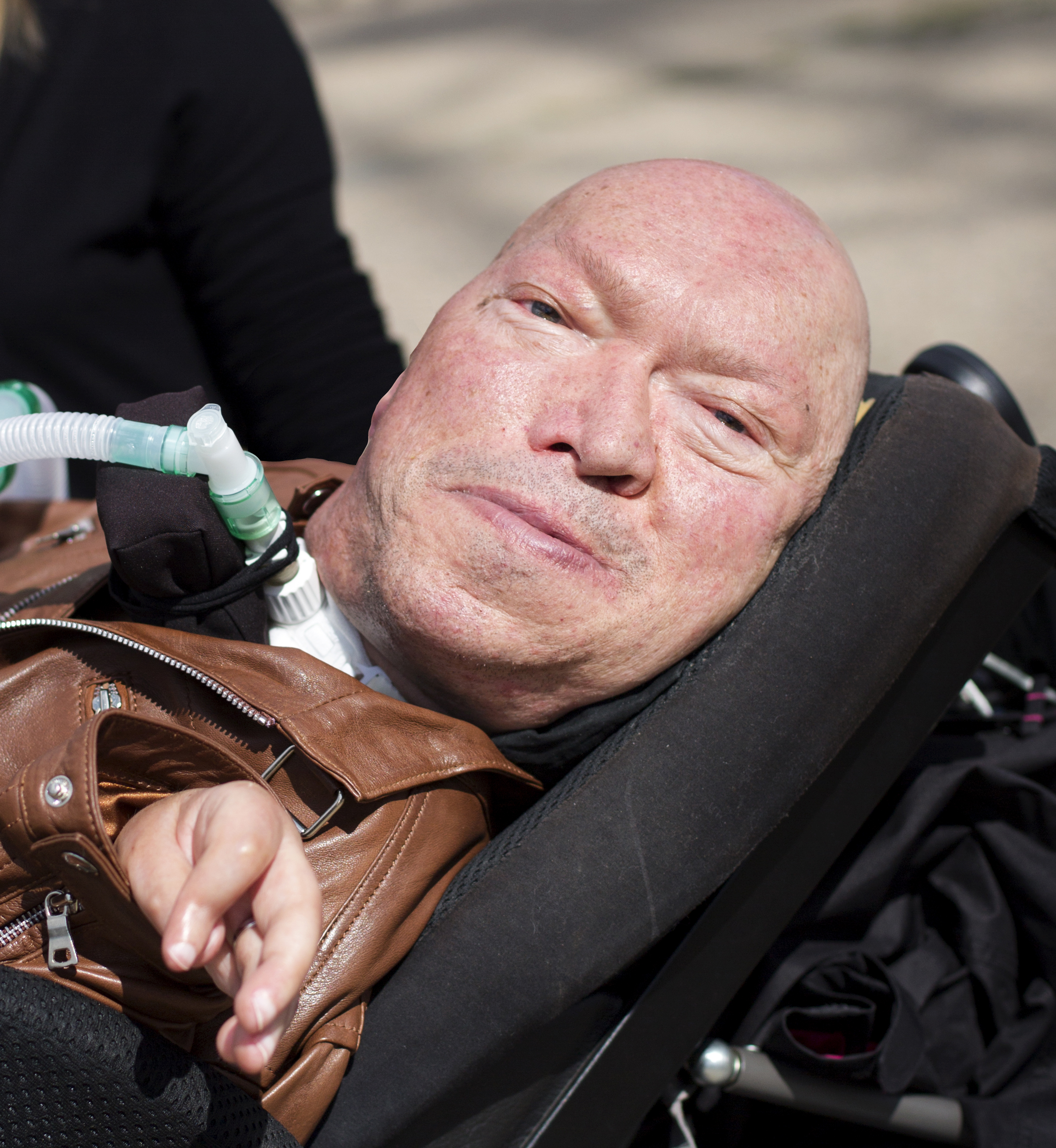
Image of Marcel Nuss

Marcel Nuss (13 February 1955 – 13 February 2024) was a French essayist with a particular interest in the sexuality of disabled people and sexual assistance. Nuss was himself severely disabled due to spinal muscular atrophy. Nuss was born in Strasbourg on 13 February 1955, and died on 13 February 2024, his 69th birthday.

== Biography ==
In 2009, Marcel Nuss founded his consulting firm, AvenbleuConsulting. In 2007, he co-founded the collective “Handicaps et sexualités” (CHS), which campaigns for the recognition of the right to sexual assistance. In 2015 he founded L'Association pour la promotion de l'accompagnement sexuel (APPAS), the first and only association in France dedicated to training surrogate partners and connecting them with people with disabilities. The first training course took place in 2015, in Erstein in the Bas-Rhin region.

Starting in 2018, he began investing his time in individual coaching and personal development workshops, which he runs in partnership with friends.

He regularly published columns in Mediapart and articles for specialist magazines.

He married to Jill Nuss, who had earlier worked as a sexual surrogate for him, on February 14th, 2015.
