= Daruma On'na =

Limbless woman in Japanese urban legend

In Japanese urban legends, daruma on'na (lit. Daruma Woman) is a woman with no arms or legs, the term is derived from daruma. The term 'prostitute' itself has slang terms like 'daruma' and 'daruma woman,' but these are simply likened to the movements of a daruma because she 'falls over to another man quickly' or '(because her job is about to fall for another man) and sleep and wake up again,' and the presence or absence of limbs is irrelevant.

== Overview ==
This refers to either a true story from the pre-war era involving a sideshow attraction, or an urban legend—the veracity of which remains unclear—about a woman who was kidnapped or abducted, had her arms and legs amputated, and was subsequently used as a "daruma woman" (a limbless, torso-only figure) for the purpose of sexual gratification or as a sideshow exhibit.

== Legend of the daruma on'na ==
In an urban legend which began circulating in the 1980s, a female university student traveling abroad on a package tour goes missing after entering a fitting room; years later, a friend discovers her on a street corner in another country, where she is being put on display—her arms and legs having been amputated, leaving her in a state resembling a daruma doll. The core of the story—in which a woman goes missing inside a fitting room—can be viewed as a variation of the "Orléans rumor"—a piece of misinformation that circulated in France around May 1969, involving the sudden disappearance of customers from a boutique.

It is believed that this urban legend originated abroad and was subsequently adapted—with details replaced by elements familiar to a Japanese audience—to make the story feel more realistic.The period during which this urban legend gained popularity coincides with a rise in the rate of women enrolling in universitiesand it also predates the sharp increase in overseas travel, a trend led primarily by women.The legend can be interpreted as a cautionary tale directed at female university students—a group that began engaging in the leisure activity of overseas travel ahead of their male counterparts.

== Historical "Daruma Women" ==
Empress Lü, the legitimate wife of Liu Bang who founded the Han dynasty, feared that her husband's death, Liu Ying (Emperor Hui), whom she had borne, might threaten the position of her own father, Lady Qi, so she cut off the limbs of Lady Qi, Liu Bang's concubine, and dubbed her a renzhi (人彘)—a term literally meaning "human-pig." This is recorded in the Records of the Grand Historian, an anecdote that illustrates Lü Zhi's cruelty.

In Chinese history, Wu Zetian, the only female emperor, also amputated the limbs of both Lady Wang (former Empress) and Lady Xiao (former Consort Shu), who competed for the favor of her late husband Gaozong, and called the longer torso 'máng' (python) and the shorter one 'xiao' (owl).

== In popular culture ==
Daruma on'na appears in a great deal of Japanese pornographic films.

=== Novels ===
'Straw Town' - Written by Toshiyuki Nishimura. The setting is that an organization that kidnaps women to make them high-class prostitutes is turning them into 'Daruma women' to set an example for women who resisted fiercely. Does not appear in the film. 'Banjo Yoru' - Written by Yusuke Miyauchi. The protagonist is kidnapped by the mafia during a school trip in Hong Kong and has his limbs amputated. 'Daruma Onna' - Written by Genichi Adachi. The story tells of a limbless female company president riding the wave of the legend of the Daruma Woman to offer tourists a simulated hard-boiled adventure. Included in the anthology novel collection 'One Night Love.'

=== Manga ===
- *Tokyo Tribe2* – Created by Santa Inoue. In this work, there is a scene featuring the creation of a "daruma woman" (a woman with her limbs amputated) as one of the bizarre, sadistic pastimes of the villainous authority figure known as "Bubba."
- *Himebina-tachi no Gogo* ("Afternoon of the Princess Dolls") – An adult-oriented manga by Sundome Oka (also known as Atsushi Ataka). This is a collection consisting exclusively of one-shot stories centered on "daruma women."
- Violence Jack – A manga by Go Nagai and Dynamic Pro. Beginning with the "Kanto Slum" arc, the series features "human dogs"—slaves subjected to extreme abuse who have had their limbs (from the elbows and knees down) amputated and their tongues removed to prevent them from committing suicide.

=== Films ===
- 13 Assassins (2010 film) – Matsudaira Naritsugu, depicted as a tyrant, turns the daughter of a peasant uprising leader into a *daruma-onna* (a limbless, torso-only woman).
- *Freakshow* (2007 version) – A remake of the famous cult film *Freaks*. In this version, a character is transformed into a "daruma woman" (a person with no limbs), though this is, of course, a special effect. While the original *Freaks* features "The Living Torso"—Prince Randian, a real-life performer born with congenital limb deficiency—it does not include a "daruma woman."
- Boxing Helena was directed by Jennifer Lynch, the daughter of David Lynch. The story centers on a surgeon who, after the woman he is infatuated with happens to be involved in a car accident, uses the pretext of medical treatment to amputate her limbs and hold her captive in his home.
- In the 1985 Japanese film 'Empress Dowager Cixi,' Princess Li, who was favored by the emperor at the end of the Qing dynasty, is envied by Empress Dowager Cixi and made into a 'Daruma Woman', but this is fiction and not factual. In reality, Consort Li gave birth to Emperor Xianfeng's only daughter, Princess Gulun of Rong'an, and after the emperor's death, she spent her remaining years in the harem. During the Tongzhi and Guangxu reigns, she was further honored as Imperial Noble Consort and Grand Consort Li, and died in 1890 at the age of 54. After her death, she was posthumously honored as Imperial Noble Consort Zhuangjing and was buried in the imperial garden tomb (the tomb of the concubines) at Dingling, the Xianfeng Emperor's Eastern Mausoleum.

=== Games ===
- *Kara no Shoujo* -
- *Hanabana no Omoi…* -
- *Nemurenu Hitsuji to Kodoku na Ookami* - One of the characters is an assassin who appears in a wheelchair; she has had all four of her limbs amputated and is referred to as a "daruma woman."
- *Hayarigami 3: Keishichou Kaii Jiken File*

== Prewar sideshow ==
There are real examples of women with damaged arms and legs performing sewing, embroidery, and calligraphy at sideshows, with Hisako Nakamura being a famous example.

== 参考文献 ==
- 松田美佐 (2014-04-25). "第3章 都市伝説の一世風靡——1980〜90年代". うわさとは何か ネットで変容する「最も古いメディア」. 中公新書. 中央公論新社. pp. 75–106. ISBN 978-4-12-102263-9.
