= Urban explorer (disambiguation) =

An urban explorer is someone who engages in urban exploration.

Urban explorer(s) may also refer to:

- Urban Explorer, a 2011 horror-thriller film
- Urban Explorers: Into the Darkness, a 2006 documentary film
