= A Life Without Pain =

- Directed by: Melody Gilbert
- Produced by: Melody Gilbert
- Cinematography: Melody Gilbert
- Edited by: Charlie Gerszewski
- Release date: March 12, 2005 (South by Southwest)
- Country: United States
- Language: English

A Life Without Pain is a 2005 documentary film by Melody Gilbert about children who can't feel pain.

== Plot synopsis ==
The film explores the daily lives of three children with congenital insensitivity to pain, a rare genetic disorder shared by just a hundred people in the world. Three-year-old Gabby from Minnesota, 7-year-old Miriam from Norway, and 10-year-old Jamilah from Germany have to be carefully guarded by their parents so they don't suffer serious, life-altering injuries.

== Reception ==
The release of the film garnered widespread interest in the topic, and Gabby was featured on The Oprah Winfrey Show in 2006.
