= Whole (film) =

- Directed by: Melody Gilbert
- Produced by: Melody Gilbert
- Cinematography: Melody Gilbert
- Edited by: Charlie Gerszewski
- Music by: CXR
- Distributed by: Sundance Channel
- Release date: June 12, 2003
- Running time: 56 minutes
- Language: English

Whole is a documentary about people with body integrity identity disorder, a rare condition which causes a desire to become an amputee. It first was broadcast on the Sundance Channel in 2004.

== Synopsis ==
The documentary examines the lives of several individuals who have body integrity identity disorder. They believe that they are supposed to have a sensory or physical disability, with some amputating a limb in order to achieve this. Some of the individuals are identified using their whole name, while others give only their first.

Referring to themselves as ″amputee wannabees″, the individuals portrayed by Gilbert find different ways of coping with their disorder. George Boyer shot his own leg off, while Kevin had a healthy leg amputated by a surgeon. Besides that mental health professionals, including Michael First, an academic psychiatrist at Columbia University, speak about their professional experience with this condition.

== Cast ==
- Michael First
- George Boyer
- Kees
- Marlene
- Baz
- Dan Cooper
- Kevin
- Robert Smith
- Leif Davis
- Jennie Cooper
- Francie Horn

== Release ==
Whole had its official premiere at the Los Angeles Film Festival in June 2003. It went on to screen at several other film festivals, including the Calgary International Film Festival, the San Francisco IndieFest, the Florida Film Festival and the Wisconsin Film Festival, before it was picked up by the Sundance Channel, which screened the documentary on May 17, 2004.

== Reception ==
The Austin Chronicle gave the film 3/5 stars, writing "Gilbert’s film takes a wide-eyed and nonmorbid approach to her subjects, and the film is sure to become required viewing among psychiatry residents during their medical training."

Carl Elliott from Slate is of the opinion that Gilbert made a sensitive film, allowing amputee wannabes to speak for themselves. The viewers are confronted with the struggles, people who are obsessed to become amputees go through, as they care confronted with their strange desire.

Robert Koehler from Variety states that the great achievement of the film is, to cast a light on this "ultra-dark corner of the medical avant-garde" and to get both subjects as well as experts to talk about this rare medical and psychiatric condition.
