= Medical fetishism =

Sexual fetish involving objects and situations of a medical or clinical nature

Medical fetishism refers to several sexual fetishes in which participants derive sexual pleasure from medical scenarios including objects, practices, environments, and situations of a medical or clinical nature. In sexual roleplay, a hospital or medical scene involves the sex partners assuming the roles of doctors, nurses, surgeons and patients to act out specific or general medical fetishes. Medical fantasy is a genre in pornography, though the fantasy may not necessarily involve pornography or sexual activity.

Medical fetishism may involve sexual attraction to respiratory therapy involving oxygen supplied via nasal cannula or any sort of mask, medical practitioners, medical uniforms, hospital gowns, anesthesia, intimate examinations (such as rectal examination, gynecological examination, urological examination, andrological examination, rectal temperature-taking), catheterization, diapering, enemas, injections, insertion (such as suppository insertion, menstrual-cup insertion, and prostatic massage), auscultation, medical devices (such as orthopedic casts and orthopedic braces; see also "abasiophilia"), dental objects (such as dental braces, retainers, and headgear), medical restraints, and medical gags.

== Physical examination ==
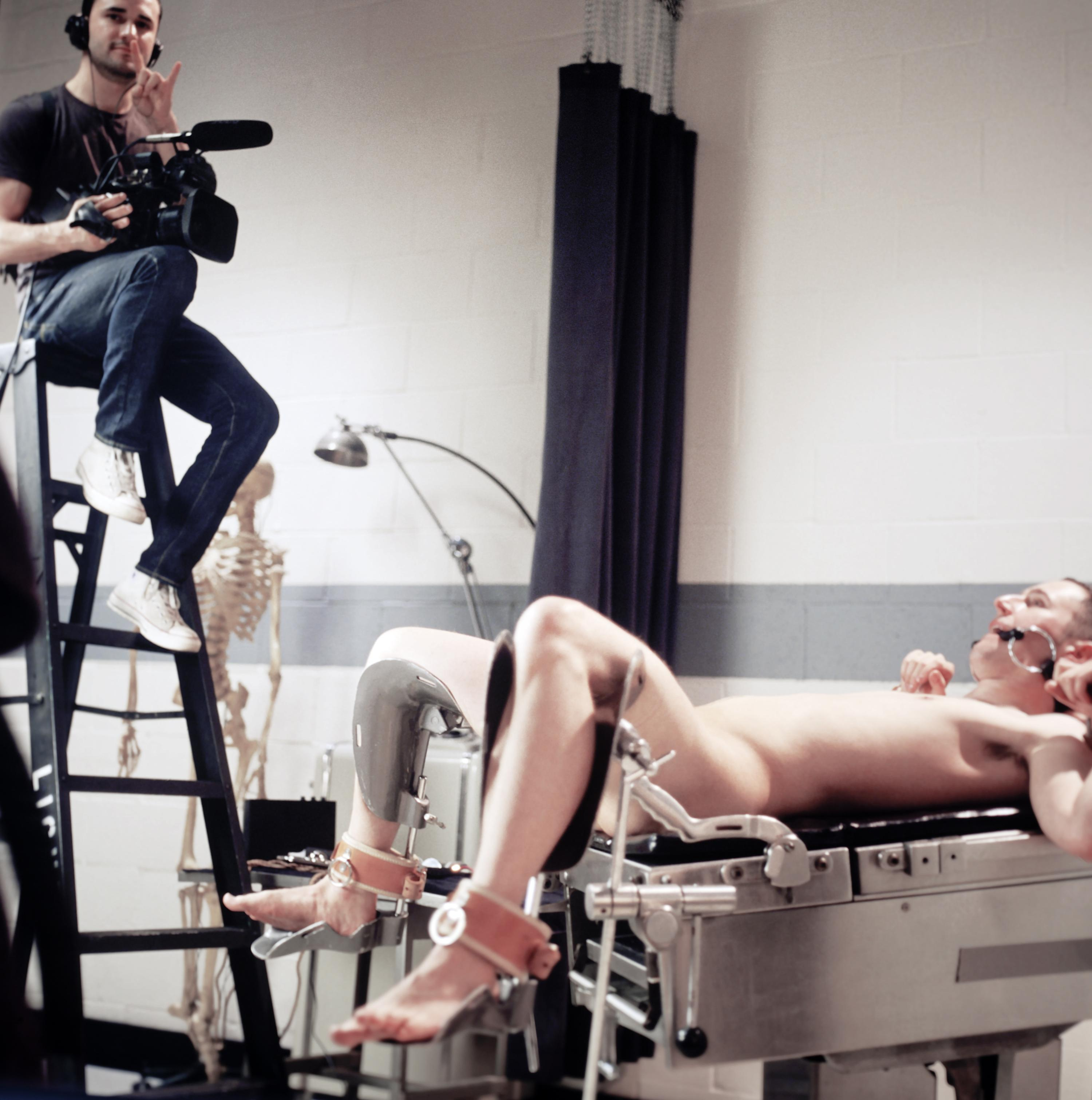
The film set in a medical fetishism scene

Examinations may include an examination and intrusion of the anus, urethra, or vagina, as well as handling and manipulation of the penis, testicles, clitoris, and nipples. Strap-on play may also be incorporated, as this can heighten the intimacy and the sensations of the "patient" (recipient). This may be a prelude to masturbation or administration of an enema. Before examination, the patient may be placed in physical restraints and gagged, and wear some form of embarrassing clothing.

== Enema fetishism ==
Enema fetishism is a sexual fetish for enemas and is a type of klismaphilia. Some may be sexually aroused by the preparations, such as by the feel and smell of a latex rubber or plastic syringe, by the smell of soapsuds enema solution, or by preparing the recipient.

Enemas can cause sexual arousal in both women and men because the bulbospongiosus muscle which starts in front of the anus contributes, in women, to clitoral erection and the contractions of orgasm, and closing the vagina. In men, this muscle correlates to erections, the contractions of orgasm, and ejaculation. Sexual sensation results from distention of the rectum by filling and dilating it with the volume of an enema which in women, puts pressure on the back of the vagina, and in men stimulates the prostate and seminal vesicles. Also, contractions of muscles throughout the abdomen caused by expulsion of an enema can stimulate, in women, the uterus and vagina, and in men, the prostate, seminal vesicle, and internal penis.

Because enemas involve at least partial nudity and the exposure and probing of the anus, many people find them embarrassing. Among the attractions to enema play are psychodrama, power exchange, erotic humiliation, discipline, and so on. BDSM punishment scenes can use extra-large volumes or highly irritating substances to produce pain and cramps.

== See also ==
- Amputation fetishism
- Klismaphilia
- List of fictional nurses
- Paraphilia
- Playing doctor

== Bibliography ==
- Gary L. Albrecht, "Encyclopedia of disability, Volume 2", Sage Publications, 2006, ISBN 0-7619-2565-1, p. 1437
- Midori, "Wild Side Sex: The Book of Kink Educational, Sensual, And Entertaining Essays", Daedalus Publishing, 2005, ISBN 1-881943-22-4, p. 211
