= Fritz: The Walter Mondale Story =

2008 television film directed by Melody Gilbert

- Directed by: Melody Gilbert
- Theme music composer: Chan Poling
- Country of origin: United States
- Original language: English

Production
- Producer: Jan Selby
- Cinematography: Melody Gilbert

Original release
- Release: 2008

Fritz: The Walter Mondale Story is a television documentary film detailing the life of former American Vice President Walter "Fritz" Mondale. It is narrated by his daughter, Eleanor Mondale.

== Plot Synopsis ==
The film is composed of rare archival footage, family home videos, and interviews with President Jimmy Carter, Vice President Al Gore, Representative Geraldine Ferraro, Minnesota Governor Arne Carlson, and his friends and family. It follows his life through his various roles as attorney general, senator, vice president, presidential candidate, ambassador, and professor.

== Reception ==
Despite his initial reluctance to participate, the film was very positively received by Walter Mondale and his family.
