= Melody Gilbert =

American independent documentary filmmaker

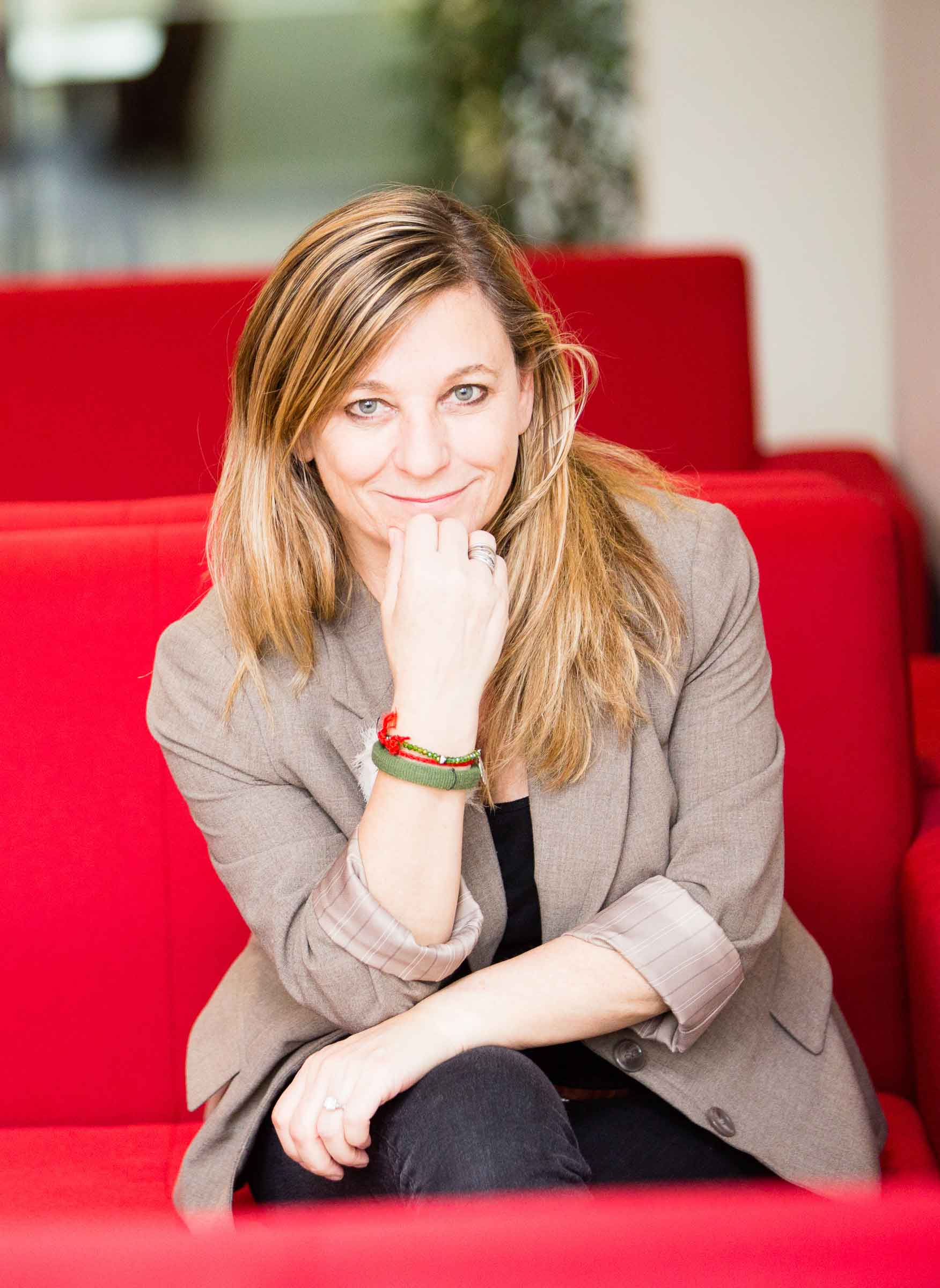
- Born: Washington, D.C., U.S.
- Education: Tulane University; University of Minnesota
- Occupation: Independent documentary filmmaker

Melody Gilbert is an independent documentary filmmaker, and educator from Washington, D.C. now living in Natchitoches, Louisiana. She has directed, filmed, produced, and sometimes edited, seven independent feature-length documentaries since 2002. The Documentary Channel calls her "one of the most fearless filmmakers in contemporary documentary cinema." She is currently an assistant professor of journalism at Northwestern State University.

The films that Gilbert directs and films are noteworthy for featuring a rare intimacy with her subjects as she unearths previously hidden worlds. She works mostly solo with a small camera and wireless microphone and has the ability to get people to reveal their innermost thoughts, whether it's the family of a child who can't feel pain (A Life Without Pain, 2005), people who want to be an amputee (Whole, 2003), a former Vice President of the United States (Fritz: The Walter Mondale Story, 2008), or people who have full-fledged relationships with synthetic companions (Silicone Soul, 2018). All of her films have been made available on Netflix and iTunes and been in prestigious film festivals and broadcast internationally on networks in Germany, France, Finland, Denmark, and more.

Gilbert also serves as a producer and writer for other documentary projects she believes in, including Beneath the Ink (nominated for a 2019 national Emmy for Outstanding Short Documentary), Women Outward Bound (2016, PBS) and the James Beard award-winning The Starfish Throwers (2015). Most recently Gilbert was a producer/story consultant for Love Them First: Lessons from Lucy Laney Elementary (2019, KARE11-TV, national broadcast in October 2019).

== Background ==
Born in Washington, D.C, raised in Chevy Chase, Maryland, and a graduate of Tulane University. Melody earned her master's degree from the University of Minnesota.

Prior to making documentaries, Melody was an award-winning broadcast journalist for 15 years at TV stations around the country. She started her career as the audience coordinator at the original Charlie Rose Show with a live audience at noon on WRC-TV in Washington, D.C. She moved on to TV stations WPIX and WOR in New York, where she worked as a production assistant and news writer and then to various stations as a reporter, producer and anchor for WAOW in Wausau, WI, WJXT in Jacksonville, FL and eventually landing in Minnesota for twenty years where she worked at TV stations including KSTP, WCCO, and Twin Cities Public Television. Her specialty was investigative journalism (she once won the national I.R.E. award for best investigative reporting for a story about how the U.S. government sprayed chemicals on unsuspecting Minneapolis residents calling it “weather testing”) as well as arts reporting. She was also freelance field producer for ABC, NBC, and CBS news going on assignment for the nightly news and morning talk shows.

Melody has been focused for the past 15 years on making independent documentaries. She says her films don't give answers; they create conversations.

Melody is also an educator, most recently on the faculty at the American University in Bulgaria for four years. She has also taught at Carleton College (Minnesota), Columbia College (Chicago), and University of Minnesota as well as overseas for U.S.I.A. in Romania and Kyrgyzstan. Melody taught courses at Film North (formerly IFP-MN) in St. Paul, Minnesota for more than 12 years.

In fall of 2019, she joined the faculty at Northwestern State University in the department of New Media, Journalism, and Communication Arts.

Melody taught her popular “Documentary Boot Camp” for more than a dozen years around the world, most recently in Moldova (Moldox), Bulgaria (Balkan Documentary Center) and Kosovo (Dokufest). She has also been a tutor for emerging filmmakers at workshops internationally and served on the jury at film festivals including MSPIFF (Minneapolis-St. Paul International Film Festival), Chronograf (Chisinau) and Sofia International Film Festival (Bulgaria). In 2017, Melody was named a Fulbright Specialist for filmmaking and journalism.

She has been awarded multiple grants and fellowships, including several from the Minnesota State Arts Board and the Jerome Foundation, and she was the first recipient of the McKnight Foundation Artist Fellowship for Filmmakers in 2004.

Melody is also very active in the filmmaking community. She is the founder and chair of the Film Fatales chapter in Minneapolis, an international group of women who direct feature-length films. She was a founding board member of Women in Film and Television in Minnesota and a long-time member of IFP-MN (now Film North) serving a board member and advisory board member.

== Filmography ==
- Married at the Mall (2002) - Director/Producer/Cinematographer
- Whole (2003) - Director/Producer/Cinematographer/Editor
- A Life Without Pain (2005) - Director/Producer/Cinematographer/Editor
- Urban Explorers: Into the Darkness (2007) - Director/Producer/Cinematographer/Editor
- Disconnected: A Documentary (2008) - Executive Producer
- Fritz: The Walter Mondale Story (2008) - Director/Producer/Cinematographer
- Tami Tushie's Toys (2010) - Director
- Numb (2010) - Executive Producer
- American Heart (2013) - Executive Producer
- The Starfish Throwers (2014) - Producer
- Steps in the Fire (2015) - Co-Director
- The Summer Help (2016) - Director/Producer/Cinematographer/Editor
- Women Outward Bound (2016) - Producer/Writer
- Silicone Soul (2018) - Director/Producer/Cinematographer
- Beneath The Ink (2019) - Producer
- Love Them First (2019) - Producer
- Stories I Didn't Know (2020) - Co-Director/Producer
- Viewfinder (2020) - Director/Producer/Cinematographer/Editor
- Judy's Thoughts (2022) - Director/Producer
- 40 Below: The Toughest Race in the World (2023) - Producer
- Queendom (2024) - Consulting Producer

== Awards and recognition ==
Gilbert received regional Emmys as producer on Our Bodies/Ourselves (2000) (TPT), and for Battered Lives (1996) (WCCO). She received the American Women in Radio and Television (AWRT) national award for best series for Defying Tradition: Hmong Teen Brides. Her short documentary Jamie Butcher Dies at Home was shown on ABC's Prime Time Live. She has also won a national award from Investigative Reporters and Editors (IRE) for Toxic testing, a short documentary about how the U.S. government sprayed citizens of Minneapolis with toxic chemicals in the 1950s. The documentary prompted an investigation led by the late U.S. Senator Paul Wellstone. Her documentaries have been the official selections of festivals SXSW, idfa, Chicago International Documentary Festival, Los Angeles Film Festival, Thessaloniki Documentary Festival, Montreal World Film Festival, Florida Film Festival, Someone to Watch at San Francisco Doc Fest, Best Feature at Boston Underground Film Festival, and won Best of Fest at Hot Docs. The Starfish Throwers, a documentary she produced, was named "the most heartwarming documentary of 2014" by the Huffington Post. Melody is also the executive producer of American Heart (2013), the co-director of Steps in the Fire (2014), the first 3D documentary in Bulgaria, and the producer/writer of Women Outward Bound (2016).

== Additional sources ==
- eFilmCritic interview, "SXSW '05 Interview: 'A Life Without Pain' Director Melody Gilbert"
- Rift Magazine, "Melody Gilbert - Documentary Filmmaker"
- Minnesota Public Radio, "Melody Gilbert's trip 'Into the Darkness'"
