= Body integrity dysphoria =

Mental disorder characterized by a desire to be physically disabled

- Other names: Body integrity identity disorder, xenomelia
- Specialty: Psychiatry, Clinical Psychology
- Symptoms: Desire to have a sensory or physical disability, discomfort with being able-bodied
- Complications: Unsafe attempts to disable oneself
- Usual onset: 8–12 years old
- Duration: Lifelong
- Risk factors: Knowing an amputee as a child
- Treatment: None
- Medication: None

Body integrity dysphoria (BID), also referred to as body integrity identity disorder (BIID), amputee identity disorder or xenomelia, and formerly called apotemnophilia, is a mental disorder characterized by a desire to have a sensory disability or physical disability or feeling discomfort with being able-bodied, beginning in early adolescence and resulting in harmful consequences. BID appears to be related to somatoparaphrenia. Some people with this condition may refer to themselves as transabled, a term coined in relation to them.

== Signs and symptoms ==
BID is a rare, infrequently studied condition in which there is a mismatch between the mental body image and the physical body, characterized by an intense desire for amputation usually of the left leg, paralysis, or to become blind or deaf. A 2017 survey by researchers at the University of Amsterdam of 80 people with BID found that 71.3% experienced sexual arousal related to their condition, with this group more likely to be men, religious, homosexual, and to have pursued self-amputation compared to those without such arousal.

Some become somewhat more comfortable with their own bodies by using prostheses and other tools to help their dysphoria, such as using a wheelchair or by blocking their vision or hearing. Some people with BID have reported to the media or by interview with researchers that they have resorted to self-amputation of a limb by, for example, freezing their limbs in dry ice (Neil Hopper, a British orthopedic surgeon suspected of doing such, and being involved with a now defunct group called Eunuch Maker) or otherwise damaging it so severely that surgeons will have to amputate it. However, the medical literature records few cases of self-amputation. A notable example is that of cricket historian Rowland Bowen, who self-amputated one of his legs below the knee in 1968.

People with BID appear to start to wish for a disability when they are young, between eight and twelve years of age. More than half of patients have described contact with an amputee during childhood, and symptoms began soon after such exposure for 56% of patients in First's study; this has been proposed as a possible risk factor. However, people with BID tend to seek treatment only when they are adults. People diagnosed with BID seem to be predominantly men, and while there is no evidence that sexual preference is relevant, there does seem to be a correlation with BID and a person having a paraphilia; there appears to be a weak correlation with personality disorders. Family psychiatric history does not appear to be relevant, and there does not appear to be any strong correlation with the site of the limb or limbs that the person wishes they did not have, nor with any past trauma to the undesired limb.

== Causes ==
As of 2014 the cause was not clear and was a subject of ongoing research. However, a small sample of people with body integrity dysphoria connected to their left leg have had MRI scans that showed less gray matter in the right side of their superior parietal lobule. The amount of gray matter missing was correlated to the strength of the patients' desire to remove their leg. Another 2020 study showed similar results after looking at sixteen men that fulfilled the diagnostic criteria for BID in connection to the left leg. MRI scans revealed reduced functional connectivity in the right paracentral lobule, which is the primary somatosensory area that incorporates information about the left leg into conscious bodily representation. Functional and structural integrity was found to be compromised in the right superior parietal lobule.

== Diagnosis ==
In the ICD-11, BID is included under the category "Disorders of bodily distress or bodily experience". It is characterized by an intense and persistent desire to become physically disabled in a significant way (e.g., major limb amputee, paraplegic, blind), with onset by early adolescence, accompanied by persistent discomfort, dysphoria, or intense feelings of inappropriateness concerning their current non-disabled body. The desire to become physically disabled can result in harmful consequences, as manifested by either the preoccupation with the desire significantly interfering with productivity, with leisure activities, with social functioning, or by attempts to become disabled having resulted in the person putting their health or life at risk. The disturbance is not better explained by another mental, behavioral or neurodevelopmental disorder, by a disease of the nervous system or by another medical condition, or by malingering." A diagnosis of gender dysphoria must be ruled out.

=== Classification ===
Prior to the release of the ICD-11, the diagnosis of BID as a mental disorder was controversial. There was debate about including it in the DSM-5, and it was not included; it was also not included in the ICD-10. It has been included in the ICD-11, which reached a stable version in June 2018, as 'Body integrity dysphoria' with code 6C21.

== Treatment and prognosis ==
There is no evidence-based treatment for BID; there are reports of the use of cognitive behavioral therapy and antidepressants that show no substantial aid to many.

The ethics of surgically amputating the undesired limb or otherwise causing the person with BID to have what disability they feel they should have are controversial.

There are numerous case reports that amputation permanently resolves the desire in affected individuals. For example, a 2024 case report described a person diagnosed with BID whose distress persisted despite antidepressant treatment and cognitive-behavioral therapy; elective amputation of two fingers resolved all symptoms, with immediate relief and improved functionality. A one-year follow-up confirmed sustained remission, with the patient reporting enhanced quality of life, full social and occupational adaptation, and no regrets.

Long-term outcomes of treated and untreated BID are not known.

== History ==
Apotemnophilia was first described in a 1977 article by psychologists Gregg Furth and John Money as primarily sexually oriented. In 1986, Money described a similar condition he called acrotomophilia; namely, sexual arousal in response to a person's amputation. Publications before 2004 were generally case studies. The condition received public attention in the late 1990s after Scottish surgeon Robert Smith amputated the limbs of two otherwise healthy people who were desperate to have this done.

In 2004, Michael First published the first clinical research in which he surveyed fifty-two people with the condition, a quarter of whom had undergone an amputation. Based on that work, First coined the term "body integrity identity disorder" to express what he saw as more of an identity disorder than a paraphilia. After First's work, efforts to study BID as a neurological condition looked for possible causes in the brains of people with BID using neuroimaging and other techniques. Research provisionally found that people with BID were more likely to want removal of a left limb than right, consistent with damage to the right parietal lobe; in addition, skin conductance response is significantly different above and below the line of desired amputation, and the line of desired amputation remains stable over time, with the desire often beginning in early childhood. This work did not explain the condition, and psychosexual research has been ongoing as well.

== Society and culture ==
BID has been portrayed in various media formats, representations being in literature, film, and television. The following sections describe appearances of BID across different media.

=== Literature ===
Fictional literature specifically focusing on BID is rare. Career of Evil by J.K. Rowling (under pen name Robert Galbraith) references BID in a negative light. Headcheese by Jess Hagemann includes themes related to BID and voluntary amputation.

=== Film ===
The documentary Whole, directed by Melody Gilbert, follows individuals with BID, offering insight into their coping mechanisms and societal reactions. The comedy film Armless, directed by Habib Azar, follows John, a man with BID who leaves his wife and travels to New York City in search of a doctor willing to amputate his arms.

=== Television ===
BID has been featured in fictional series on television. CSI: NY (Season 1, Episode 6, "Outside Man", 2004) featured an investigation about the death of a man who had his physically healthy leg amputated. Nip/Tuck (Season 3, Episode 7, "Ben White", 2005) included a character with BID who requests the amputation of his healthy leg. Casualty (Season 22, Episode 21, 2008) portrayed a woman who intentionally had her leg amputated by a train and was diagnosed with BID. Similarly, Mental (Season 1, Episode 12, "Life and Limb," 2009) depicts a factory worker who chopped off his fingers and refused reattachment surgery. Psychiatrist Dr. Charles treats a man with BID in Chicago Med (Season 1, Episode 13, "Us", 2016).

== See also ==
- Abasiophilia
- Acrotomophilia
- Attraction to disability
- Body dysmorphic disorder
- Body modification
- Silver Spring monkeys
- Quid Pro Quo
- Armless
- Whole
