= Acrotomophilia =

Sexual attraction to amputees

Acrotomophilia (from the Greek ἀκρότομος "having the top cut off"; from ἄκρον akron "extremity" and --τομος -tomos from τέμνω temno "I cut" and φιλία philia "love") is a paraphilia in which an individual expresses strong sexual interest in amputees. It is a counterpart to apotemnophilia, the desire (although not necessarily sexual) to be an amputee.

== Overview ==
Acrotomophiles may be attracted to amputees because they like the way they look or they may view the amputee's stump as a phallic object which can be used for sexual pleasure. Acrotomophiles may enjoy the idea of dominating the amputee during couples play and they may also become aroused with the thought of taking care of an amputee.

== Interests and behaviours ==
In a survey of acrotomophiles, leg amputations were preferred over arm amputations, amputations of a single limb over double amputations, and amputations that left a stump over amputations that left no stump. According to Per Solvang (2007), "Devotees adhere to standard conceptions of attractiveness in all other matters outside of amputations."

== Ethical issues ==
Some people question whether amputating one's own body parts or operating on a partner for the sake of sexual pleasure is ethical. For some, modifying the body is a private ritual of self-ownership and freedom of choice. Psychiatrists may make a diagnosis of body integrity identity disorder.

== Terminology ==
The term amelotatism has also been used to describe acrotomophilia. The sexual interest in being an amputee is apotemnophilia. John Money (1977) used the terms autoapotemnophilia and alloapotemnophilia to describe the erotic interest of wanting to be or appear as an amputee versus wanting amputees as sexual partners; neither term has been widely used since. The term teratophilia is used to describe arousal from deformed or monstrous people.

== See also ==
- Attraction to disability
- Body dysmorphic disorder
- Boxing Helena, a feature film concerning amputee fetishism
- Disability
- Genital modification and mutilation
- List of paraphilias
