= Abasiophilia =

Sexual attraction to people with impaired mobility

Abasiophilia is a psychosexual attraction to people with impaired mobility, especially those who use orthopaedic appliances. The sexual desire for oneself to have impaired mobility is called autoabasiophilia. Abasiophilia is considered a form of morphophillia, as it is usually directed towards the person using the mobility aids rather than the mobility aid itself. It is a type of devotism.

== History ==
Richard von Krafft-Ebing recorded several cases of abasiophilia in Psychopathia Sexualis, though he did not use that exact term. Another description was in 1930 by Wilhelm Stekel, who called it "orthopedic fetishism" and believed it to stem from an aversion to women with an active or dominant sexuality. Dr. Maria F. Fleischl wrote a similar case study about a man in 1960, referring to it as "the fantasy of the cripple" and believed that the man had developed it due to his self-loathing. The term abasiophilia was first used by John Money of the Johns Hopkins University in a paper on paraphilias, in 1990.

== Characteristics and research ==
Abasiophilia describes an exclusive sexual interest in those who use mobility aids (such as wheelchairs, leg braces, or crutches) and a similar interest in people with physical conditions that cause them difficulty walking.

A 1998 survey from Abasiophilia Information found that just under 92% of respondents were white men and that about 64% were between the ages of 48 and 65. This same survey found that the majority of respondents with an interest in leg braces preferred ones made from leather, as this was the style of brace they saw most when growing up in the 50s and 60s. Since the eradication of polio led to fewer people needing to wear leg braces, other mobility aids have become more popular among abasiophiles. They may participate in medical roleplay or actively seek out disabled people in a romantic or sexual context.

== In culture and media ==
Abasiophilia plays a prominent role in the Michael Connelly's 2009 novel The Scarecrow, in which a serial killer is motivated by abasiophilia.

== See also ==
- Attraction to disability
- Medical fetishism
- Crash (1996 film)
- Quid Pro Quo (2008 film)

== Bibliography ==
- Anon (2009). "What is abasiophilia?". Abasiophilia Information. Abasiophilia Study. Archived from the original on 13 April 2012.
- Bruno, Richard L. (December 1997). "Devotees, Pretenders and Wannabes: Two Cases of Factitious Disability Disorder" (PDF). Sexuality and Disability. 15 (4): 243–260. doi:10.1023/A:1024769330761.
- Fleischl, Maria F. (October 1960). "A Man's Fantasy of a Crippled Girl". American Journal of Psychotherapy. 14 (4): 741–748. doi:10.1176/appi.psychotherapy.1960.14.4.741.
- Krafft-Ebing, R. von (Richard) (1931) [1903]. Psychopathia sexualis : with especial reference to the antipathic sexual instinct a medico-forencis study (12 ed.). London : W. Heinemann.
- Mora, Carolina (1 January 2016). "DEVOTEES, WANNABES Y PRETENDERS: PARAFILIAS VINCULADAS A LA DISCAPACIDAD" [Devotees, wannabes and pretenders: Paraphilias linked to the disability]. Revista Interamericana de Psicologia (in Spanish). 50: 358–370.
