= Urban Explorers: Into the Darkness =

- Directed by: Melody Gilbert
- Produced by: Melody Gilbert
- Cinematography: Melody Gilbert; Adrian Danciu
- Edited by: Charlie Gerszewski
- Music by: Dave Salmela
- Distributed by: Films Transit International
- Release date: May 2007
- Running time: 86 minutes
- Language: English

Urban Explorers: Into the Darkness is a documentary film about urban exploration directed by Melody Gilbert.

== Soundtrack artists ==
- Big Fuckin Skull
- Big Quarters
- Cave Man
- Terry Eason
- The Hopefuls
- Kid Dakota
- Mark Mallman
- John Munson
- The Owls
- P.O.S
- David Salmela
