= Quid Pro Quo (film) =

- Theatrical release poster
- Directed by: Carlos Brooks
- Written by: Carlos Brooks
- Produced by: Sarah Pillsbury; Midge Sanford
- Starring: Nick Stahl; Vera Farmiga
- Cinematography: Michael McDonough
- Edited by: Charles Ireland; Lauren Zuckerman
- Music by: Mark Mothersbaugh
- Production companies: HDNet Films; Sanford/Pillsbury Productions; 2929 Productions
- Distributed by: Magnolia Pictures
- Release date: June 13, 2008
- Running time: 81 minutes
- Country: United States
- Language: English
- Box office: $11,864

Quid Pro Quo is a 2008 American drama film, written and directed by Carlos Brooks, and starring Nick Stahl and Vera Farmiga. The film premiered at the 2008 Sundance Film Festival on January 20, 2008, and was released in the United States on June 13, 2008.

== Plot ==
Isaac Knott is a successful radio talk show host on a New York City public radio outlet. He lost the use of his legs at the age of eight in an automobile accident that claimed the lives of his parents. He uses a wheelchair.

One day, Isaac learns about a man who showed up at a local hospital and demanded to have his legs amputated. The man was part of a secret subculture of able-bodied people who want to be paraplegics. Calling themselves “Wannabes,” they use wheelchairs whenever possible and try to deaden their legs through artificial means. Isaac becomes fascinated by these people, and begins studying the phenomenon for a news piece on his radio show.

Through his research, Isaac meets Fiona, a sexy and mysterious blonde who collects and restores Chinese art. Fiona also owns a wheelchair she doesn't really need. Increasingly attracted to her, Isaac tries to learn all he can about her role in the fake-paraplegic underground. Fiona, however, does not give away her secrets for free. Soon, Isaac discovers that the exchange of information and trust goes deeper the longer they know one another.

== Cast ==
- Nick Stahl as Isaac Knott
- Vera Farmiga as Fiona Ankany
- Rachel Black as Janice Musslewhite
- Jessica Hecht as Edie
- Jacob Pitts as Hugh
- Ashlie Atkinson as Candy
- Pablo Schreiber as Brooster
- Jeane Fournier as Charlene Coke
- Michal Sinnott as Mrs. Knott
- Joshua Leonard as Mr. Knott
- James Frain as Father Dave
- Aimee Mullins as Raine
- Dylan Bruno as Scott
- Kate Burton as Merilee
- Ellen Marlow as Young Fiona Ankany
- Tommy Nelson as Young Isaac Knott
- Phil LaMarr as Wannabe Group Leader

== Production ==
On his inspiration for the film, director Carlos Brooks commented: "I was interested in taking this story into the psychological realm, where no matter what our physical condition, we all have the same psychological potentials or limitations that we struggle with. Isaac puts on these shoes which allow him to walk again. That send him on a quest where, in the end, he discovers that he has really been investigating himself." Through doing online research, Brooks said he discovered "there were people out there for whom getting help would be the exact opposite of what I thought getting help would be", leading to the idea of the Wannabes in the film. Brooks said the story was driven by the question of "why 'help' for an able-bodied person would be to have a disability, whereas 'help' to people with disabilities might be to regain use of certain functions."

Principal photography for Quid Pro Quo took place on location in Upper Freehold, New Jersey, with additional road scenes shot in La Conner, Washington.

== Reception ==
Review aggregator website Rotten Tomatoes gave Quid Pro Quo an approval rating of 58%, based on 36 reviews. The critical consensus reads, "Despite a stunning performance by Vera Farmiga, Quid Pro Quo never develops its effective parts into a convincing whole." On Metacritic, the film holds an average score of 55 out of 100, based on 13 reviews, indicating "mixed or average reviews".

Critics said the film did not go far enough into the question of why able-bodied people would want to be handicapped. Kirk Honeycutt of The Hollywood Reporter said "Brooks delves into a netherworld of fetishisms and handicap worship in his daring first feature, Quid Pro Quo. The trouble is the movie isn’t daring enough. Brooks tiptoes into territory Luis Buñuel would have frolicked in, but he does so without the master surrealist’s desire to outrage and confound his viewers."

Writing for Paste, Alissa Wilkinson reviewed the film positively, writing Brooks "channels the inherent shock value of his material into a thoughtful, measured meditation on the nature of healing, wholeness and desire. Stahl and Farmiga are finely and unnervingly subtle, leaving unsettledness about what just happened and what it all means. The film, intimately shot, sidesteps exploitative potential, and the finely tuned screenplay obscures its titular theme (colloquially translated 'tit for tat’) in multiple layers of narrative and a hit of noir."

Though critics were mixed on the film’s plot and ending, with some criticizing the twist ending in particular, multiple critics commended Farmiga’s performance as Fiona. Reyhan Harmanci of the San Francisco Chronicle wrote "the only real tension onscreen is her mercurial moods, as she vacillates between objectifying Knott…to irrational, hysterical anger", adding, "it’s a shame…that the script didn't call for her to go full-on Fatal Attraction [as] she could have pulled it off." Honeycutt wrote, "Her Fiona is strong and weak, erotic and enigmatic, provocative and pathetic." Leo Goldsmith of IndieWire opined, "Though the film hints at sensitive and psychologically complex subject matter, it seems far more interested in wrapping its story up in a pretty and clever way than delving into rich emotional territory." Honeycutt concluded, "This is a startling and promising debut film by Brooks. You just wish he would trust his bent for the surreal more than he does."

== See also ==
- Body integrity identity disorder
