= Sexual assistance =

Supporting adults with disabilities in the whole spectrum of their sexuality

Sexual assistance is support for disabled people so that they can have sexual access to their own body and sexual experiences. Some people with physical disabilities may not have the dexterity, mobility, or other freedom of movement to engage in sexual activities, including masturbation, without physical assistance from another party. The support provided may range from assistance with preparation, which may include self-grooming; accessing and using sex aids or sexual services; and physical assistance with bodily movement and positioning.

== Ethics and criticism ==
Advocates of sexual assistance believe this practice allows people with disabilities to exercise their sexual rights on the same basis as non-disabled individuals do, thereby placing sexual assistance services into the same category as any other form of social assistance. Opposing positions consider that it is a form of prostitution which, in their view, is sexual exploitation, and should be abolished.

== See also ==
- Attraction to disability
- Personal care assistant
- Sex therapy
- Surrogate partner
