= Boxing Helena =

1993 American thriller film by Jennifer Lynch

- Theatrical release poster
- Directed by: Jennifer Lynch
- Screenplay by: Jennifer Lynch
- Story by: Philippe Caland
- Produced by: Philippe Caland; Carl Mazzocone
- Starring: Julian Sands; Sherilyn Fenn; Bill Paxton; Art Garfunkel; Betsy Clark; Kurtwood Smith
- Cinematography: Bojan Bazelli; Frank Byers
- Edited by: David Finfer
- Music by: Graeme Revell
- Production company: Main Line Pictures
- Distributed by: Orion Classics (North America); Republic Pictures (International)
- Release date: September 3, 1993
- Running time: 105 minutes
- Country: United States
- Language: English
- Box office: $1.8 million

Boxing Helena is a 1993 American avant-garde thriller film written and directed by Jennifer Lynch (Note: Credited as Jennifer Chambers Lynch.) from a story by Philippe Caland. It stars Sherilyn Fenn, Julian Sands, and Bill Paxton.

Before its release, the film's production was hampered by legal battles with Madonna and Kim Basinger, who had both backed out of the starring role. The film debuted at the Sundance Film Festival in January 1993 and was nominated for the Grand Jury Prize for Dramatic Feature. After receiving an NC-17 rating from the MPAA, the film was given an R rating on appeal and released in the United States in September 1993. It was a critical and commercial failure.

== Plot ==
Nick Cavanaugh, an Atlanta surgeon, begins moving into his recently deceased mother Marion's lavish home with his girlfriend Anne Garrett. However, he remains fixated on his neighbor Helena—a beautiful but shrewish woman with whom he had one intimate experience—although she harbors disdain for him. Nick and Anne host a housewarming party and Nick invites Helena, who leaves early with Nick's friend Russell much to his dismay. Anne leaves Nick after realizing his obsession with Helena. Helena leaves her address book at Nick's house and reluctantly agrees to return the next day to retrieve it.

After Helena suffers a high-grade tibial fracture in a hit-and-run accident as she attempts to leave Nick's house on foot, Nick kidnaps her and covertly provides her with illicit medical care in the confines of his home. He goes to the extreme of amputating both her legs. Later, following her attempt to choke him, Nick goes even further by amputating her arms above the elbow as a means of keeping her under his control. Despite Helena being the victim of Nick's kidnapping and mutilation, she dominates the dialogue with constant ridicule of his shortcomings and continues rejecting his affections despite being dependent on him for care. She begrudgingly becomes calmer and more accepting of Nick until the unexpected arrival of her boyfriend Ray O'Malley, who has been searching for the missing Helena, which escalates into a violent altercation that ends with Ray threatening to shoot Nick with a pistol. Although Ray leaves after pleas from Helena, Nick is crushed by a falling Venus statue.

However, it is ultimately revealed that Nick's kidnapping of Helena is a vivid napping dream that Nick is having while waiting at the hospital for Helena to recover from emergency surgery. In reality, he had called the ambulance and sought proper medical help for her after the accident. Later at home in bed with Anne, Nick wakes from a nightmare, still haunted by his love for Helena.

== Cast ==
- Sherilyn Fenn as Helena
- Julian Sands as Nick Cavanaugh
- Bill Paxton as Ray O'Malley
- Kurtwood Smith as Alan Palmer
- Art Garfunkel as Lawrence Augustine
- Betsy Clark as Anne Garrett
- Nicolette Scorsese as Fantasy Lover/Nurse
- Meg Register as Marion Cavanaugh
- Bryan Smith as Russell
- Marla Levine as Patricia
- Kim Lentz as Nurse Diane
- Lloyd T. Williams as Sam

== Production ==
Producer Philippe Caland came up with the idea, but wanted a woman to write it and approached Jennifer Lynch after she gave a poetry reading. At first, Lynch declined to get involved, reportedly telling him "Well, that sounds kind of terrible." But Caland was eventually able to convince her to work on it. In writing, Lynch was inspired by some elements from her own childhood, telling Vice that being born with club feet, and her grandmother owning a Venus de Milo replica, influenced her insight into the characters:

It always struck me the way people looked at the Venus. They didn't see her as broken, they saw her as beautiful. And it really made a huge impact on me. I thought I was broken and that maybe someday someone would find me beautiful. So this idea of a damaged boy who was in an obsessive situation who would try to recreate from his own view the one thing that didn't hit him or abandon him was this armless, beautiful woman. And therefore in a dream recreate this obsessive thing where we take from one another until we are the size and shape that we think the other person should be for us.

Madonna was slated to play Helena but shortly before filming was to begin in January 1991 she dropped out, halting the production. The next month, in an attempt to salvage the film, Lynch met with Kim Basinger about playing Helena. Basinger agreed but closer to the new filming date she began requesting what The New York Times called "major script revisions", which according to producer Carl Mazzocone amounted to making Helena "less of a bitch". After the production failed to make the changes to Basinger's satisfaction she also quit the picture.

Legal battles involving both stars then ensued. Eventually Basinger was the subject of an adverse jury verdict for over $8.1 million, which bankrupted her. The verdict was set aside on appeal in 1994 but Basinger later settled for $3.8 million. Meanwhile, Fenn, who had previously worked with Lynch's father David on Twin Peaks, was cast as Helena in December 1991. By this time a third major star, Ed Harris, had also backed out of the film due to the ever-increasing delays, telling The New York Times, "I needed to get on with my life."

=== Music ===
The score heard during the scene where Helena showers in a fountain while a party crowd watches was originally composed by Graeme Revell and based on the "Love Theme" used sparsely elsewhere in the film, with vocals by Bobbi Page. At the producers' request, "The Fountain Song", written and performed by Wendy Levy, replaced Revell's score in the DVD and subsequent releases.

== Release ==
Boxing Helena premiered at the Sundance Film Festival in January 1993 and was theatrically released by Orion Classics in the United States on September 3, 1993, Entertainment Film Distributors in the United Kingdom on June 18, 1993 and Republic Pictures in other international territories.

=== Box office ===
The film performed poorly at the box office, grossing $1,796,389 in the domestic box office.

== Reception ==
The film was heavily panned by critics upon release, and was widely considered to be of poor quality, despite garnering praise at Sundance. On the review aggregator website Rotten Tomatoes, 17% of 36 critics' reviews are positive, with an average rating of 3.7/10. The website's consensus reads: "A disturbing concept marred by graceless execution, Boxing Helena is a psychosexual drama that proves more tedious than provocative." Metacritic, which uses a weighted average, assigned the film a score of 25 out of 100, based on 14 critics, indicating "generally unfavorable" reviews. However, at least two major film critics thought the film had been unjustly maligned. Chicago Tribune critic Gene Siskel was one of the few positive notices, giving the film three out of four stars. Also positive was Janet Maslin, who wrote in the New York Times that "As it turns out, Ms. Lynch has both talent and a point. Her film is by no means the gory, exploitative quasi-pornography that it sounds like from afar."

=== Nominations and awards ===
The film was nominated for the Grand Jury Prize at the 1993 Sundance Film Festival. Lynch won a Golden Raspberry Award for Worst Director at the 14th Golden Raspberry Awards in 1994.

=== In popular culture ===
In their 1999 album Famous Monsters, punk rock band the Misfits have a song titled "Helena", which features lyrics that align with many of the movie's themes and plot points:

If I cut off your arms and cut off your legs,
Would you still love me anyway?
If you're bound and you're gagged, draped and displayed,
Would you still love me anyway? — The Misfits, Helena

Corey Taylor, leader of the metal band Slipknot, has stated in a 2012 Q&A that the song "Purity" from their 1999 eponymous album was inspired by Boxing Helena, as well as The Collector.

== See also ==
- List of American films of 1993
- Amputee fetishism
