= Manual stimulation =

Manual stimulation may refer to:

- Massage, the manual stimulation of various parts of the body
- Manual stimulation of nipples
- Manual sex, sexual activity involving using the hands to stimulate a partner's genitals
- Handjob, manual sex performed on the penis
- Jerking off/wanking, a form of masturbation performed on the penis
- Fingering, manual sex or a form of masturbation performed on the vulva or vagina
- Anal fingering, manual sex or a form of masturbation performed on the anus
