= Milk bath =

Bath with alleged health benefits

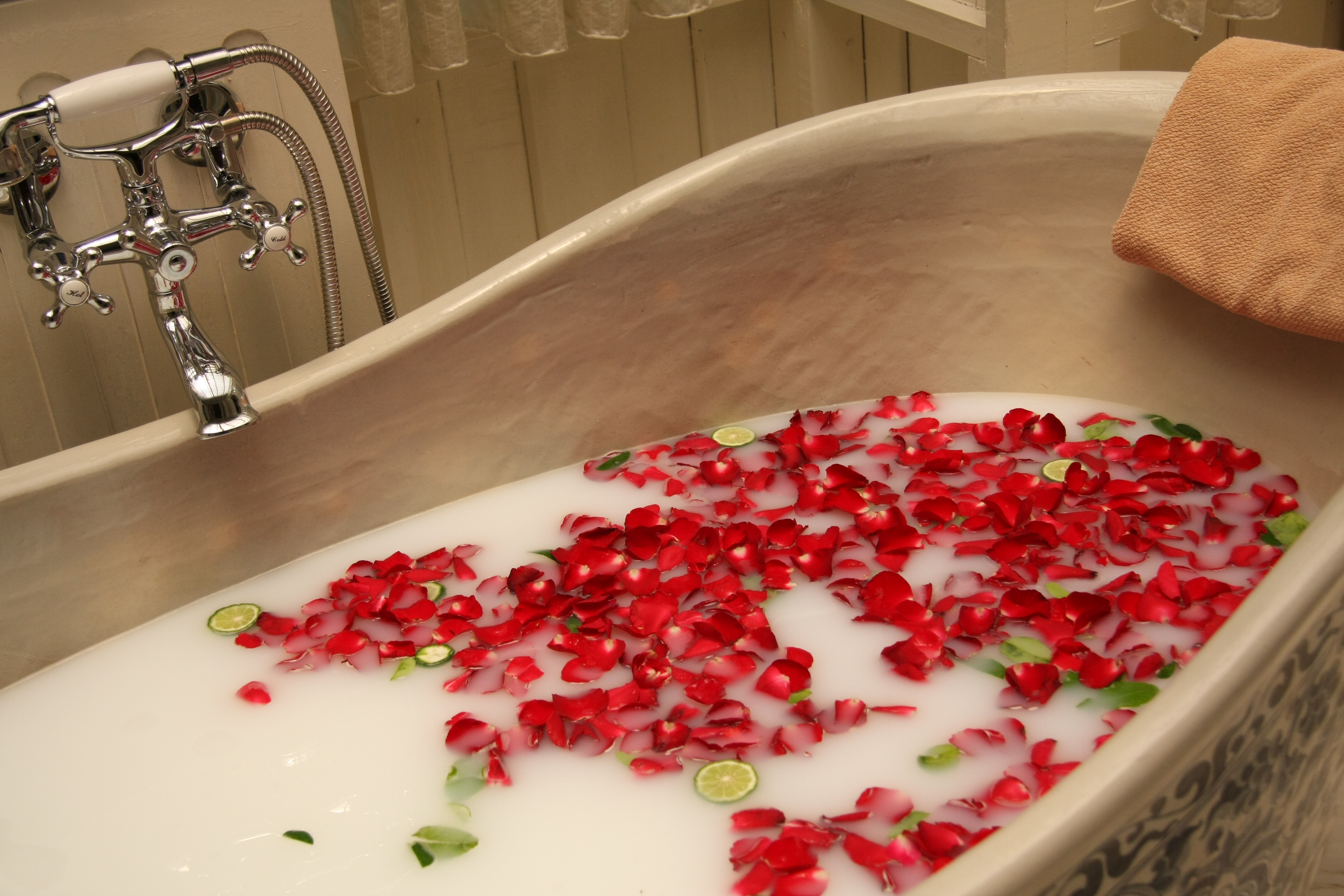
A milk and rose-petal bath at a spa resort in Thailand

A milk bath is a bath taken in milk instead of water. Scented ingredients, such as honey, rose, daisies and essential oils are often added. Milk baths use lactic acid, an alpha hydroxy acid, to dissolve the proteins which hold together dead skin cells.

== History ==
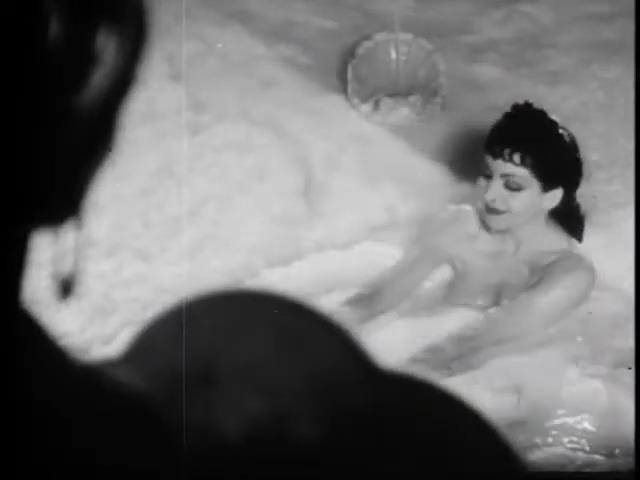
Claudette Colbert's famous scene bathing as Roman empress Poppaea Sabina in milk, from the 1932 movie The Sign of the Cross, which made through her bathing in milk being associated with Cleopatra, who she portrayed in 1934.

There are legends that Cleopatra bathed in donkey milk daily for her complexion. These legends have not been confirmed. Historian Adrian Goldsworthy, author of Antony and Cleopatra, believes that Roman Empress Poppaea (wife of Nero) set this bathing fashion 80 years after Cleopatra's death, and only in modern times, through both being portrayed by Claudette Colbert in the 1930s, did Cleopatra get associated with bathing in milk.

Queens Catherine Parr and later Elizabeth I of England bathed in milk in the belief that it would make their skin appear more youthful and pale.

Tincture of benzoin was also referred to as a 'milk bath' in the United States in the 19th century, which could in some cases be confused for baths of cow milk, also popular at the time.

Lozi traditions describe the wealth of the Litunga (king) by saying that his wife, called Namayowa ta lole ("she who lacks nothing"), bathed in milk.

There are references to cows milk as a bath technique found in India in the 19th century in "Fifty-one years of Victorian life" by Margaret Elizabeth Child Villiers, Countess of Jersey.

In the early 20th century, singer and Broadway star Anna Held was reported to bathe in milk daily. She was later quoted as having bathed in milk two times a week when living in Paris, finding it difficult to do so while traveling. Her husband Florenz Ziegfeld Jr. later reported to the press that she bathed in milk daily and set up photo shoots so that reporters could photograph the milk being delivered to her.

A buttermilk bath was also a common historical bathing technique for show animals and remains in practice today (such as for pigs and dogs).

== In folklore ==
According to scholars, milk baths were used "as a recipe for beauty", as well as for healing and rejuvenation.

== In film and media ==
- A milk bath for supposed medicinal purposes for a dying child can be seen in the 1931 film Night Nurse.
- Poppaea (Claudette Colbert) bathes in milk in the 1932 film The Sign of the Cross.
- In Gigi, Aunt Alicia is seen taking a milk bath with lace lining the bathtub.
- In Carry On Cleo (1964), Mark Antony first encounters Cleopatra while she is taking a milk bath.
- In the 1973 film Charlotte's Web, Edith Zuckerman, Homer's wife, suggests giving Wilbur a buttermilk bath in preparation for the fair.
- Queen Ravenna (Charlize Theron) is depicted bathing in a milk bath while wearing her crown in the 2012 film Snow White and the Huntsman
- A milk bath can be observed in season 1, episode 9 of the Spartacus television series, performed by Lucretia (Lucy Lawless).
- In the show The Boys there is a scene a male character (Homelander) taking a bath in breast milk, and was subsequently discussed as a case of lactophilia.
- In 2017 a widely discussed piece of art of a hoax advert in which a woman adverts for having men bath in her milk and watch them, found many inquiries of interest.

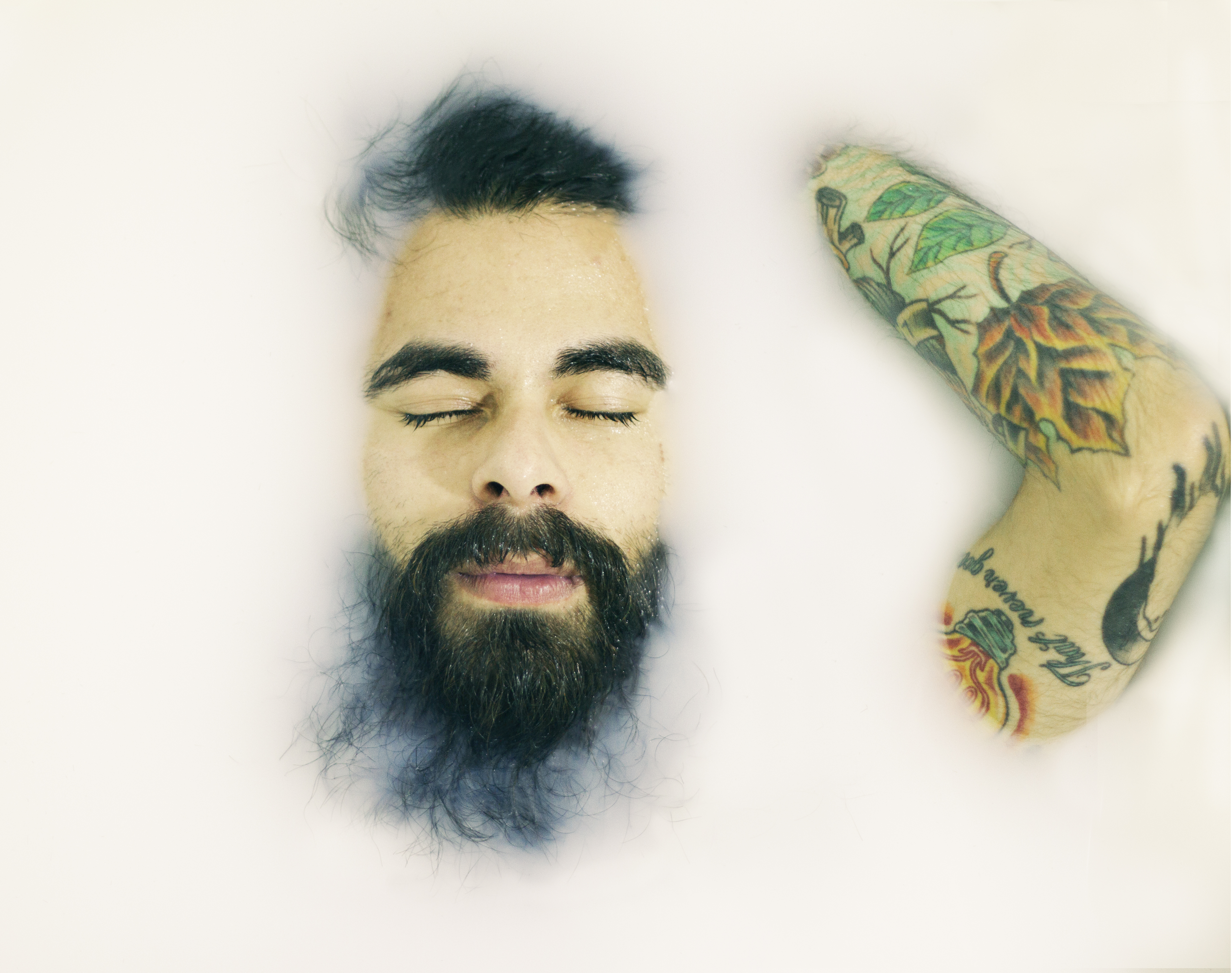
A man relaxes in a milk bath
