= Erotic lactation =

Sexual arousal from breastfeeding or adult nursing

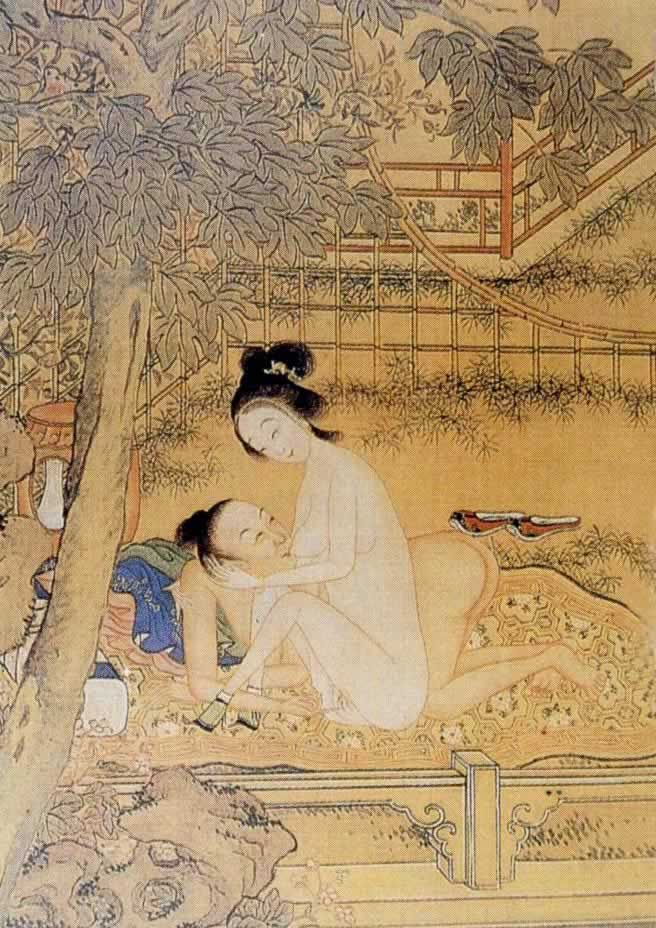
Ming Dynasty Chinese painting depicting erotic lactation

Erotic lactation (clinically known as milk fetishism or lactophilia) is sexual arousal from breastfeeding or sucking on a female breast. It may occur in the context of an adult nursing relationship (ANR). The clinical terms are classified as paraphilias in systems such as the ICD-10 and DSM-IV, but when practiced consensually between adults, erotic lactation can serve erotic, emotional, or nurturing purposes without being considered a disorder.

== Physiology ==
Breasts, and especially nipples, are highly erogenous zones, for both men and women. Nipple and breast stimulation of women are a near-universal aspect of human sexuality, though men's nipples are not as sexualized. Humans are the only primates whose female members have permanently enlarged breasts after the onset of puberty; the breasts of other primate species are enlarged only during pregnancy and nursing. One hypothesis postulates that the breasts grew as a frontal counterpart to the buttocks as primates became upright in order to attract mates, a model first developed in 1967. Other hypotheses include that by chance breasts act as a cushion for infant heads, are a signal of fertility, or elevate the infant's head in breastfeeding to prevent suffocation. Paradoxically, there is even a school that believes that they are an evolutionary flaw, and can actually suffocate a nursing infant. The association of pleasure and nutrition holds true as well for the lips, also erogenous zones, where pleasure may have led to "kiss feeding", in which mothers chew food before passing it on to the child. (Note: The ethologist Irenäus Eibl-Eibesfeldt documented several cultures with "kiss feeding" practice and assumes an evolution from caring for nutrition to erogenous zone.)

Unintended milk flow (galactorrhea) is often caused by nipple stimulation and it is possible to reach normal milk production exclusively by suckling on the breast. Nipple stimulation of any sort is noted in reducing the incidence of breast cancer.

Certain individuals may experience a loss of arousal while breastfeeding, making the idea of lactation with a partner non-erotic for them. This can stem from physical causes, such as soreness, or psychological factors, such as feeling conflicted about their breasts being used for purposes other than nursing an infant.

== Lactation, re-lactation and induced lactation ==
Erotic lactation between partners, or an adult nursing relationship, may develop from natural breastfeeding of a baby. During the lactation period, one partner begins to suckle from the female breast and continues after the baby is weaned. Milk production is continually stimulated, allowing the milk flow to persist. According to the book Body Parts: Critical Explorations in Corporeality, adult nursing may occur when an individual, usually a mother, chooses to continue lactating after weaning a child to avoid the significant physical challenges associated with inducing lactation.

However, milk production can be "artificially" and intentionally induced in the absence of any pregnancy in an individual. This is called induced lactation, while someone who has lactated before and restarts is said to relactate. This can be done by regularly sucking on the nipples (several times a day), massaging and squeezing the female breasts, or with additional help from temporary use of milk-inducing drugs, such as the dopamine antagonist Domperidone. In principle—with considerable patience and perseverance—it is possible to induce lactation by sucking on the nipples alone.

It is not necessary that the individual has ever been pregnant, and they can be well in their postmenopausal period. Once established, lactation adjusts to demand. As long as there is regular breast stimulation, lactation is possible.

== Motivations ==
Because female breasts and nipples are generally regarded as an important part of sexual activity in most cultures, it is not uncommon that couples may proceed from oral stimulation of the nipples to actual breastfeeding. In its March 13, 2005, issue, the London weekly newspaper The Sunday Times reported a commercial survey of around 2000 British men, carried out by the infant formula manufacturer Cow & Gate, which indicated that in a third of all couples, the male partner had tasted their partner's breast milk. The men regularly said their motive was an emotional desire to increase their role in infant rearing.

Erotic lactation is sometimes seen as a kink. Those who partake in it can become sexually aroused by seeing a person lactate, having sex with a lactating person or sucking on their breasts.

== Social implications ==
The breasts have two main roles in human society: nutritive and sexual. Breastfeeding in general is considered by some to be a mild form of exhibitionism, especially in Western societies (see breastfeeding in public). Breastfeeding parents have faced legal ramifications for nursing their children into toddler-hood or in public, or for photographing themselves while nursing.

Researcher Nikki Sullivan, in her book A Critical Introduction to Queer Theory, calls erotic lactation a manifestation of "Queer." She defines Queer as an ideology; that is, as a "sort of vague and indefinable set of practices and (political) positions that has the potential to challenge normative knowledges and identities." Drawing on a statement of David Halperin, she continues "since queer is a positionality rather than an identity in the humanist sense, it is not restricted to gays and lesbians but can be taken up by anyone who feels marginalized as a result of their sexual practices." The heteronormative profile of breastfeeding assumes certain norms:

- an infant up to twelve months old;
- motivations of nutritional and developmental benefits for the child and physiological benefits for the mother;
- possible secondary motivations of convenience and cheapness;
- practice in private, domestic settings; and
- breast milk-consumption exclusivity to the youngest infant

Additionally, any relevant third party is assumed to be the mother's significant other and this person is relegated to a supportive role to maximize the breastfeeding mother's success.

== Prevalence ==
Though birth is the beginning of the separation between mother and child, breastfeeding slows this process, making the mother and infant connect physically continually, sometimes for years. As a source of nourishment, the immediacy of this connection is intensified. Breastfeeding has a sexual element as a result of physiological factors. In a study conducted in 1999, approximately 33 to 50 percent of mothers found breast feeding erotic, and among them 25 percent felt guilty because of this. This study corroborated a study in 1949 that found that in a few cases where the arousal was strong enough to induce orgasm, some nursing mothers abandoned breastfeeding altogether. In a 1988 questionnaire on orgasm and pregnancy published in a Dutch magazine for women, when asked "Did you experience, while breastfeeding, a sensation of sexual excitement?", 34 percent (or 153 total) answered in the affirmative. An additional 71 percent answered in the affirmative when asked "Did you experience, while breastfeeding, pleasurable contractions in the uterine region".

== Varieties ==
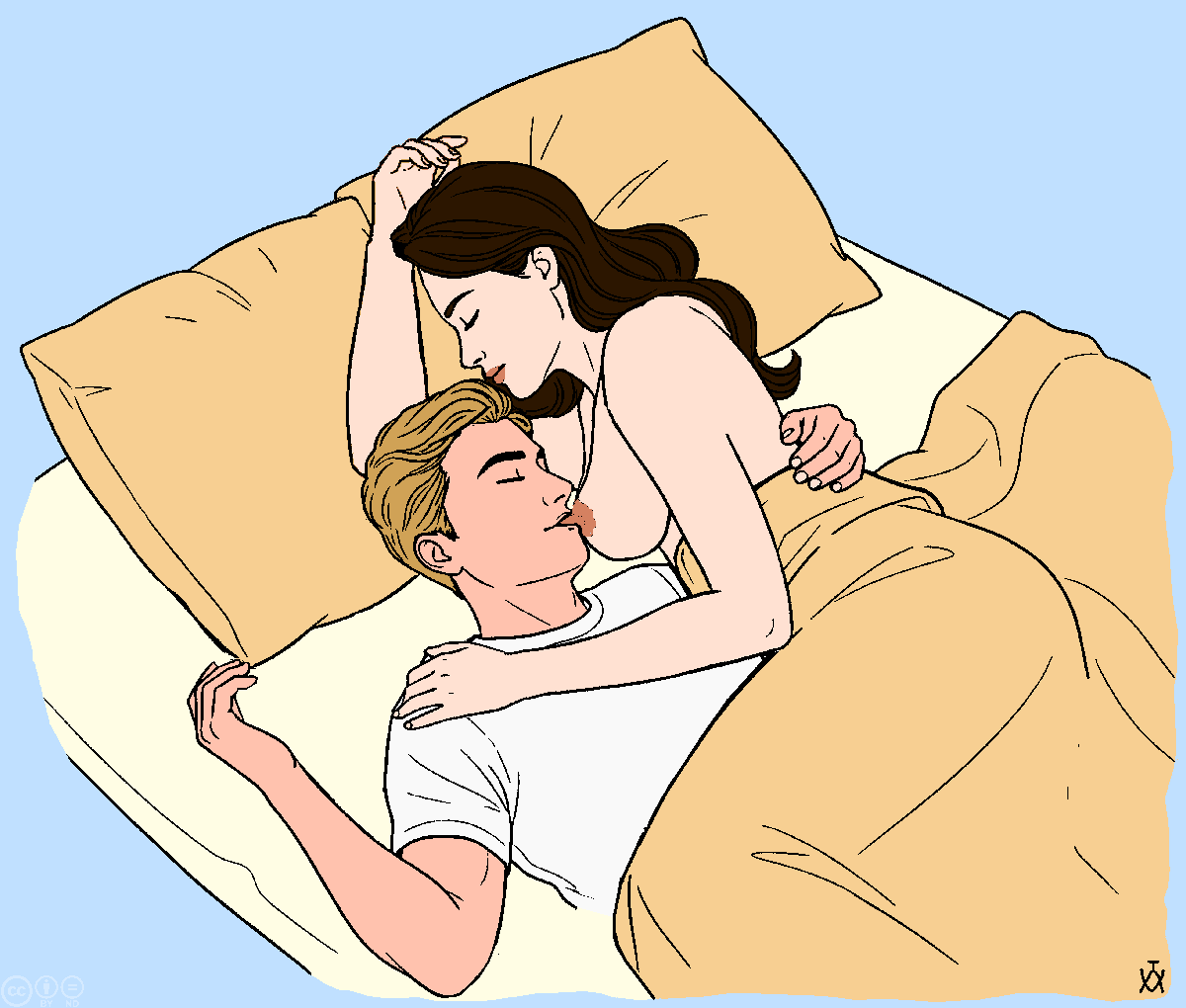
Erotic lactation

Various methods are employed to practice erotic lactation. They are listed according to prevalence, in decreasing order:

=== Lactation games ===
Lactation games include any kind of sexual activity which includes a person's breast milk. Such activity is widespread, and often unintentional, in the time after someone gives birth, since many people experience a let-down reflex (releasing milk) when sexually aroused.

=== Lactation pornography ===
While lactation does appear in pornography, it is a specialty niche and is considered taboo by many because of its proximity to incest and children. Most breast representations are without milk, and abound in the media in an erotic way both in and out of pornography.

=== Adult nursing relationship ===
An adult nursing relationship (ANR) involves the suckling of milk from a person's breast on a regular basis by one or more partner(s). Successful ANRs depend on a stable and long-term relationship, as otherwise it is very difficult to maintain a steady milk flow. Couples may begin an ANR by transferring regular suckling from a child to a sexual partner (e.g. spouse). Such a relationship may form as an expression of close intimacy and mutual tenderness, and may even exist without sex. Breastfeeding can have a strong stabilizing effect on the partnership. The person breastfeeding may experience orgasms or a pleasurable let-down reflex.

ANRs have also been employed in cases where a parent may desire to breastfeed their child, but has to find an alternative to inducing lactation. They may have difficulty beginning lactation, and so supplement the infant's suckling with that of a partner. Or there are cases where breastfeeding was interrupted for an extended period of time as a result of infant prematurity, infant absence, or parent's illness (taking prescription medication). In such cases, adult nursing has often caused lactation to continue until it was possible for the child to resume breastfeeding. Others may want to nurse an adopted child, so use an ANR to stimulate breast milk production before the adoption occurs. Though such scenarios do not have erotic motivations, erotic expression may be an additional aspect of the relationship.

=== Pumping ===
Some people experience sensual pleasure from using a breast pump to extract milk from their breasts or from expressing milk manually—with or without a partner. In addition to the sensual pleasure, women have reported feeling more feminine while producing milk and continue with lactation for emotional or sensual reasons after weaning a baby.

=== Lactation prostitution ===
This is the act of breastfeeding adults for pay (not to be confused with wet nursing, the practice of breastfeeding infants or babies for pay). In 2003, there was a report of Chinese brothel that offered lactation services to its clients. In 2013 a domestic staff agency in China was reported to be providing wet nurses for the sick and other adults as well as for newborns. The agency's clients could choose to drink the breast milk directly from the breast or to drink it via a breast pump. The reports caused controversy in China, with one blogger describing it as "adding to China's problem of treating women as consumer goods and the moral degradation of China's rich". In 2014, there were reports of several subscription websites in China providing contact details of lactating women available to breastfeed adults for a fee. In 2015 there were reports from Japan about the Bonyu Bar (Mother's Milk Bar), located in Tokyo's entertainment and red-light district of Kabukicho, which employed nursing women to provide customers with breast milk in a glass for 2,000 yen (about 15 euros) or directly from the nipple for 5000 yen (about 37.50 euros). In the latter case the women could run their fingers through the customers' hair, coo and say their name as they suckled.

=== Infantilism ===
As a part of the sexual fetish of infantilism, the non-lactating partner assumes the role of a baby in sexual role-play. Breastfeeding might play a secondary role in this type of relationship; and being pampered by "mommy", wearing diapers, or a hidden incestuous character may be the predominant motivation in this kind of relationship.

=== Milk ===
Lactated human milk can be a fetish in it self, being one reason for men purchasing human milk.

In 2017 a widely discussed piece of art of a hoax advert in which a woman adverts for having men bath in her milk and watch them, found many inquiries of interest.

== Adult lactation in history ==
Since the European Middle Ages, a multitude of subliminally erotic, visionary experiences of saints have been passed on in which breastfeeding plays a major role. One prominent example is the Lactatio of Saint Bernard of Clairvaux.

=== Roman Charity ===
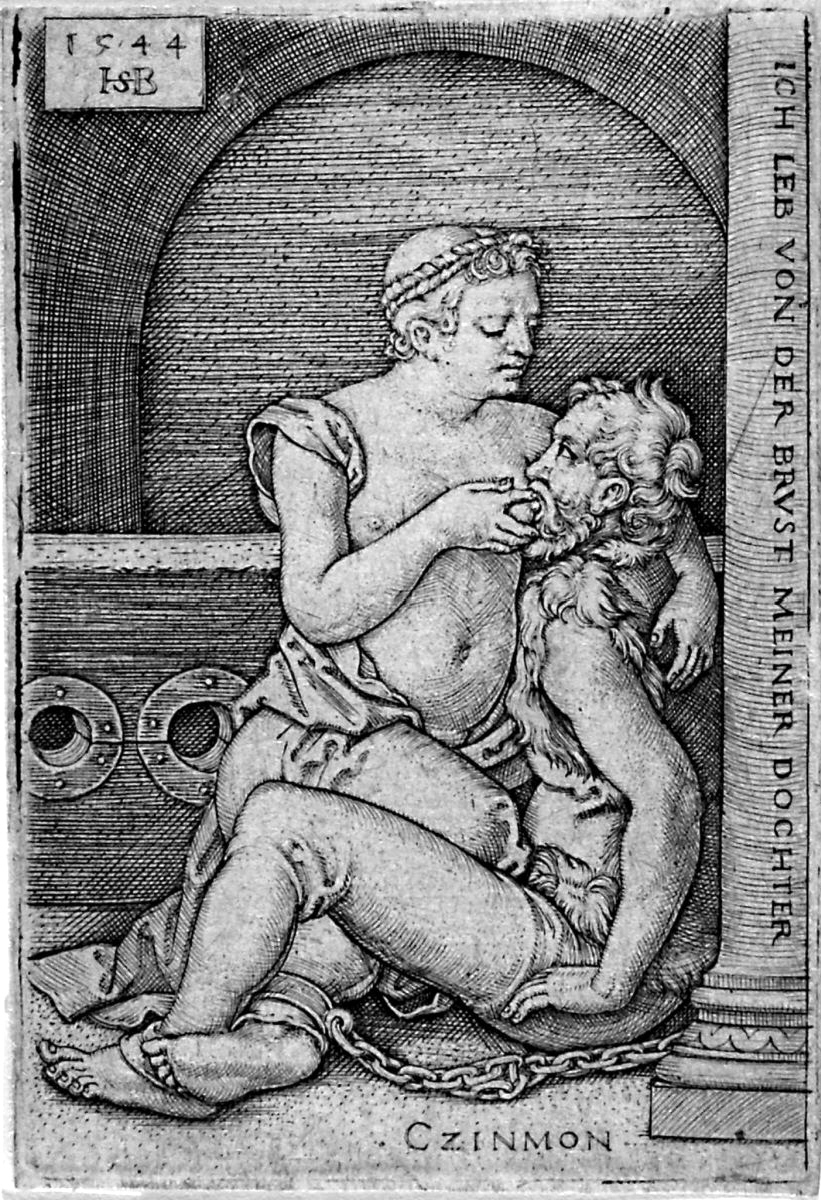
"Cimon and Pero" by Hans Sebald Beham

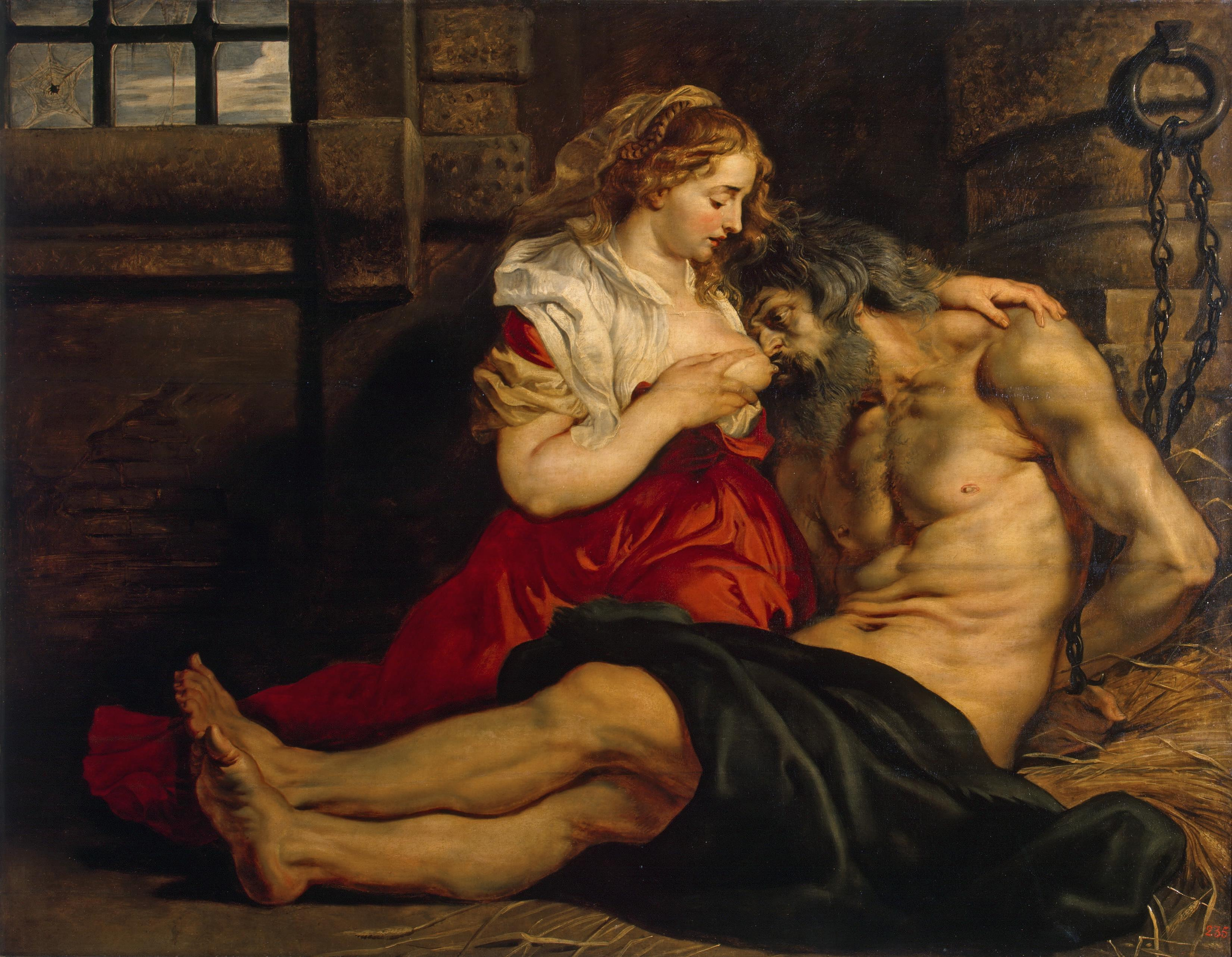
"Roman Charity" by Peter Paul Rubens 1612

Roman Charity (or Caritas Romana) is a story of a woman, Pero, who secretly breastfeeds her father, Cimon, after he is incarcerated and sentenced to death by starvation. She is found out by a jailer, but her act of selflessness impresses officials and wins her father's release. The story comes from the Roman writer Valerius Maximus in the years AD 14–AD 37. In about AD 1362 the story was retold by the famous writer Giovanni Boccaccio. After Boccaccio, hundreds or possibly thousands of paintings were created, which tell the story. A variant of this story can be found at the conclusion of John Steinbeck's 1939 novel The Grapes of Wrath. Primarily, the story tells of a conflict. An existing taboo (implied incest and adult breastfeeding of a woman's milk) or saving a life by breaking the taboo. In this aspect there is no erotic focus to the story.

Valerius Maximus tells another story about a woman breastfeeding her mother, which is followed by the very short story of a woman breastfeeding her father. The second, father-daughter story in fact consists of one sentence only. Thirteen hundred years later, Boccaccio retells the (first) mother-daughter story, and does not mention the father-daughter story, and the first is apparently forgotten, leading to nearly all "caritas romana" oil paintings and drawings showing only the father-daughter story.

=== Pre-industrial England ===
Adult suckling was used to treat ailing adults and treat illnesses including eye disease and pulmonary tuberculosis. The writer Thomas Moffat recorded one physician's use of a wet nurse in a tome first published in 1655.

=== Islamic law ===
In traditional Islamic law, a child under the age of two (besides many strict rules like that the suckling should be of such quantity that it could be said that the bones of the child were strengthened and the flesh allowed to grow. And if that cannot be ascertained, then if a child suckles for one full day and night, or if it suckles fifteen times to its fill, it will be sufficient), is that woman's child through a foster relationship (the woman is then called "milk mother"). However, according to the Jurist Abu's-Su`ud (c.1490–1574), this only applies to sucklings under the age of two and a half years. Also, according to Ayatollah Ali al-Sistani, a highly praised scholar for the Shia Muslims: "The child should not have completed two years of his age". The same latter source states at least eight conditions that should apply before that child is considered a son/daughter of the feeding woman. (This is not considered to be an adoption, which is strictly proscribed by the Qu'ran.) A modern Saudi Jurist, in 1983, upheld that if a man suckles from his wife, their marriage is nullified. The query remains a popular one into the 21st century, and has come up in Saudi advice columns. A Sunni cleric Sheik Ezzat Atiya (عزت عطية), President of the Hadith Department of Egypt's al-Azhar University issued a fatwa in 2007 encouraging women to breastfeed their male business colleagues so that the man could become symbolically related to the woman, thereby precluding any sexual relations and the need for both sexes to observe modesty. "Breast feeding an adult puts an end to the problem of the private meeting." It was later denounced and declared defamatory to Islam.

=== Germany ===
In 1903, German philosopher Carl Buttenstedt published his marriage guidebook "Die Glücksehe – Die Offenbarung im Weibe, eine Naturstudie" (The Marriage of Happiness – The Revelation in the Woman, a study from nature), in which he described and recommended the lactational amenorrhea method (LAM) as a form of contraception and natural family planning that also deepens the relationship between wife and husband. He explicitly described erotic lactation as a source of great sexual pleasure for both partners, claiming that this is intended by nature especially on the part of the woman. This particular aspect of his broader general marriage philosophy gained a lot of attention and sparked wide debate. While some welcomed Buttenstedt's advice as inspirational for new ways to improve sexual satisfaction between marriage partners, others warned that this technique could "pathologically increase sexual sensation of both partners." Consequently, the book was banned by the Nazis in 1938.

== See also ==
- Breastfeeding in Islam
- Breast fetishism
- Lactation
- Mammary intercourse
- Nipple stimulation
- Sexual fetishism
