= Stillbirth =

Death of a fetus at or after 20–28 weeks of pregnancy

- Other names: Fetal death, fetal demise
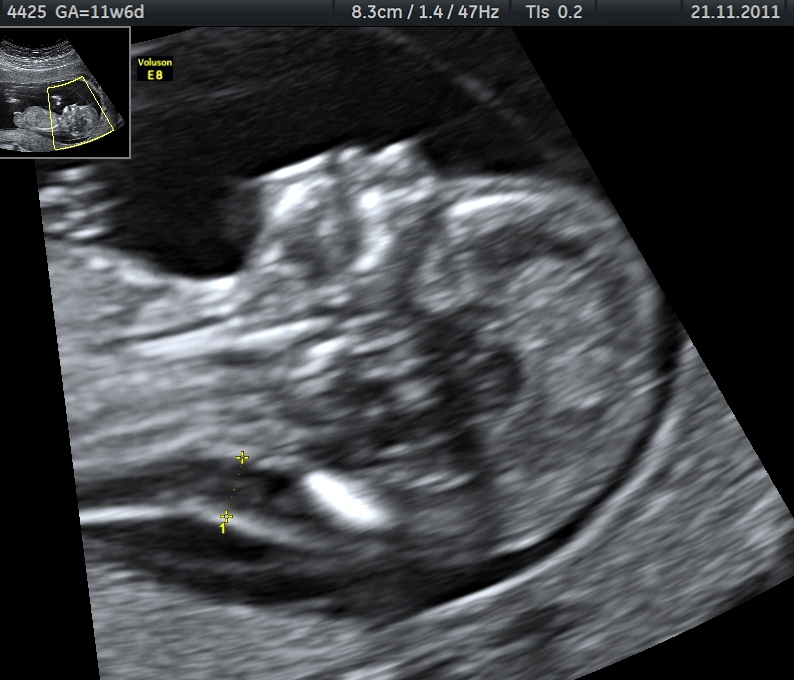
- Ultrasound is often used to diagnose stillbirth and medical conditions that raise the risk.
- Specialty: Obstetrics and Gynaecology, neonatology, pediatrics
- Symptoms: Fetal death at or after 20 / 28 weeks of pregnancy
- Causes: Often unknown, pregnancy complications
- Risk factors: Mother's age over 35, smoking, drug use, use of assisted reproductive technology
- Diagnostic method: No fetal movement felt, ultrasound
- Treatment: Induction of labor, dilation and evacuation
- Frequency: 1.9 million (1 for every 72 total births)

Stillbirth is typically defined as the death of a fetus at or after 20 or 28 weeks of pregnancy, depending on the source. It results in a baby born without signs of life. A stillbirth can often result in the feeling of guilt or grief in the mother. The term is in contrast to miscarriage, which is an early pregnancy loss, and sudden infant death syndrome, where the baby dies a short time after being born alive.

Often the cause is unknown. Causes may include pregnancy complications such as pre-eclampsia and birth complications, problems with the placenta or umbilical cord, birth defects, infections such as malaria and syphilis, and poor health in the mother. Risk factors include a mother's age over 35, smoking, drug use, use of assisted reproductive technology, and first pregnancy. Stillbirth may be suspected when no fetal movement is felt. Confirmation is by ultrasound.

Worldwide prevention of most stillbirths is possible with improved health systems. Around half of stillbirths occur during childbirth, with this being more common in the developing than developed world. Otherwise, depending on how far along the pregnancy is, medications may be used to start labor or a type of surgery known as dilation and evacuation may be carried out. Following a stillbirth, women are at higher risk of another one; however, most subsequent pregnancies do not have similar problems. Depression, financial loss, and family breakdown are known complications.

Worldwide in 2021, there were an estimated 1.9 million stillbirths that occurred after 28 weeks of pregnancy (about 1 for every 72 births). More than three-quarters of estimated stillbirths in 2021 occurred in sub-Saharan Africa and South Asia, with 47% of the global total in sub-Saharan Africa and 32% in South Asia. Stillbirth rates have declined, though more slowly since the 2000s. According to UNICEF, the total number of stillbirths declined by 35%, from 2.9 million in 2000 to 1.9 million in 2021. It is estimated that if the stillbirth rate for each country stays at the 2021 level, 17.5 million babies will be stillborn.

== Causes ==
As of 2016, there is no international classification system for stillbirth causes. Many stillbirths have unknown causes, even in cases where extensive testing and an autopsy have been performed. A rarely used term to describe these is "sudden antenatal death syndrome", or SADS, a phrase coined in 2000. Many stillbirths occur at full term to apparently healthy pregnant women, and a postmortem evaluation reveals a cause of death in about 40% of autopsied cases.

About 10% of cases are believed to be due to obesity, high blood pressure, or diabetes.

Other risk factors include:

- bacterial infection, like syphilis
- malaria
- birth defects, especially pulmonary hypoplasia
- chromosomal aberrations
- growth restriction
- intrahepatic cholestasis of pregnancy
- maternal diabetes
- maternal consumption of recreational drugs (such as alcohol, nicotine, etc.) or pharmaceutical drugs contraindicated in pregnancy
- postdate pregnancy
- placental abruptions
- physical trauma
- radiation poisoning
- Rh disease
- celiac disease
- female genital mutilation
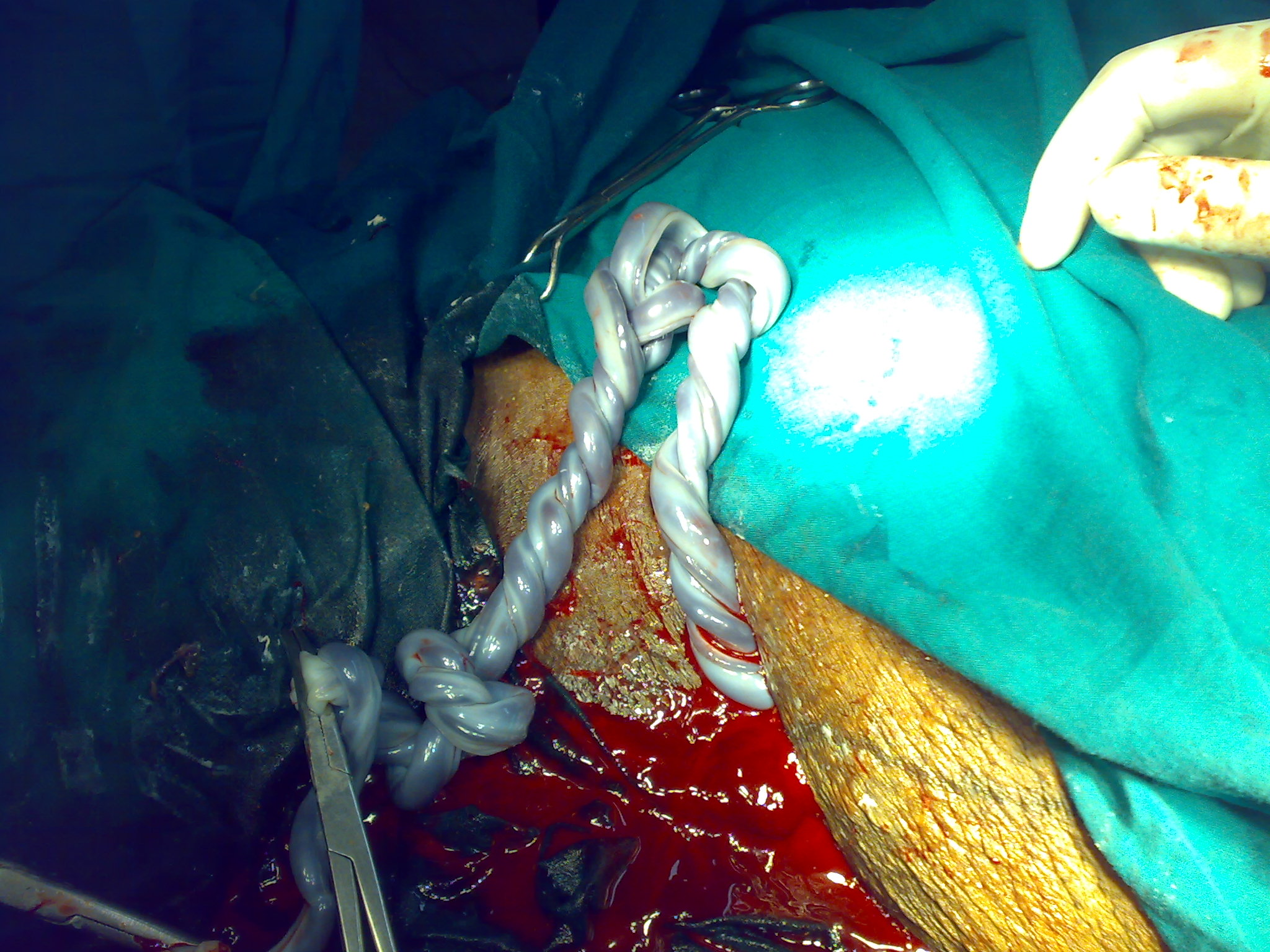
  Entanglement of cord in twin pregnancy at the time of Caesarean section
- umbilical cord accidents
  - Prolapsed umbilical cord – Prolapse of the umbilical cord happens when the fetus is not in a correct position in the pelvis. Membranes rupture, and the cord is pushed out through the cervix. When the fetus pushes on the cervix, the cord is compressed and blocks blood and oxygen flow to the fetus. The pregnant woman has approximately 10 minutes to get to a doctor before there is any harm done to the fetus.
  - Monoamniotic twins – These twins share the same placenta and the same amniotic sac and therefore can interfere with each other's umbilical cords. When cord entanglement is detected, it is highly recommended to deliver the fetuses as early as 31 weeks.
  - Umbilical cord length – A short umbilical cord (<30 cm) can affect the fetus in that fetal movements can cause cord compression, constriction, and rupture. A long umbilical cord (>72 cm) can affect the fetus depending on the way the fetus interacts with the cord. Some fetuses grasp the umbilical cord, but it is yet unknown as to whether a fetus is strong enough to compress and stop blood flow through the cord. Also, an active fetus, one that frequently repositions itself in the uterus, can accidentally entangle itself with the cord. A hyperactive fetus should be evaluated with an ultrasound to rule out cord entanglement.
  - Cord entanglement – The umbilical cord can wrap around an extremity, the body, or the neck of the fetus. When the cord is wrapped around the neck of the fetus, it is called a nuchal cord. These entanglements can cause constriction of blood flow to the fetus. These entanglements can be visualized with ultrasound.
  - Torsion – This term refers to the twisting of the umbilical around itself. Torsion of the umbilical cord is very common (especially in equine stillbirths), but it is not a natural state of the umbilical cord. The umbilical cord can be untwisted at delivery. The average cord has three twists.
- Smoke inhalation – If a pregnant woman gets trapped in a building fire, the smoke and fumes can kill a fetus.

A pregnant woman sleeping on her back after 28 weeks of pregnancy may be a risk factor for stillbirth.

After a stillbirth, there is a 2.5% risk of another stillbirth in the next pregnancy (an increase from 0.4%).

In the United States, the highest rates of stillbirths happen in pregnant women who:

- are of low socioeconomic status
- are aged 35 years or older
- have chronic medical conditions such as diabetes, high blood pressure, high cholesterol, etc.
- are African-American
- have previously lost a pregnancy
- have multiple children at a time (twins, triplets, etc.)

== Diagnosis ==
It is unknown how much time is needed for a fetus to die. Fetal behavior is consistent, and a change in the fetus's movements or sleep-wake cycles can indicate fetal distress. A decrease or cessation in sensations of fetal activity may be an indication of fetal distress or death, Still, medical examination, including a nonstress test, is recommended in the event of any change in the strength or frequency of fetal movement, especially a complete cease; most midwives and obstetricians recommend the use of a kick chart to assist in detecting any changes. Fetal distress or death can be confirmed or ruled out via fetoscopy/doptone, ultrasound, and/or electronic fetal monitoring. If the fetus is alive but inactive, extra attention will be given to the placenta and umbilical cord during ultrasound examination to ensure that there is no compromise of oxygen and nutrient delivery.

Some researchers have tried to develop models to identify, early on, pregnant women who may be at high risk of having a stillbirth.

=== Definition ===
There are several definitions for stillbirth. To allow comparison, the World Health Organization uses the ICD-10 definitions and recommends that any baby born without signs of life at greater than or equal to 28 completed weeks' gestation be classified as a stillbirth. The WHO uses the ICD-10 definitions of "late fetal deaths" as their definition of stillbirth. Other organisations recommend that any combination of greater than 16, 20, 22, 24, or 28 weeks of gestational age or 350 g, 400 g, 500 g or 1000 g birth weight may be considered a stillbirth.

The term is often used in distinction to live birth (the baby was born alive, even if they died shortly thereafter) or miscarriage (early pregnancy loss). The word miscarriage is often used incorrectly to describe stillbirths. The term is mostly used in a human context; however, the same phenomenon can occur in all species of placental mammals.

=== Constricted umbilical cord ===
When the umbilical cord is constricted (q.v. "accidents" above), the fetus experiences periods of hypoxia, and may respond by unusually high periods of kicking or struggling, to free the umbilical cord. These are sporadic if constriction is due to a change in the fetus's or mother's position, and may become worse or more frequent as the fetus grows. Extra attention should be given if mothers experience large increases in kicking from previous childbirths, especially when increases correspond to position changes.

Regulating high blood pressure, diabetes, and drug use may reduce the risk of a stillbirth. Umbilical cord constriction may be identified and observed by ultrasound, if requested.

Some maternal factors are associated with stillbirth, including being age 35 or older, having diabetes, having a history of addiction to illegal drugs, being overweight or obese, and smoking cigarettes in the three months before getting pregnant.

== Treatment ==
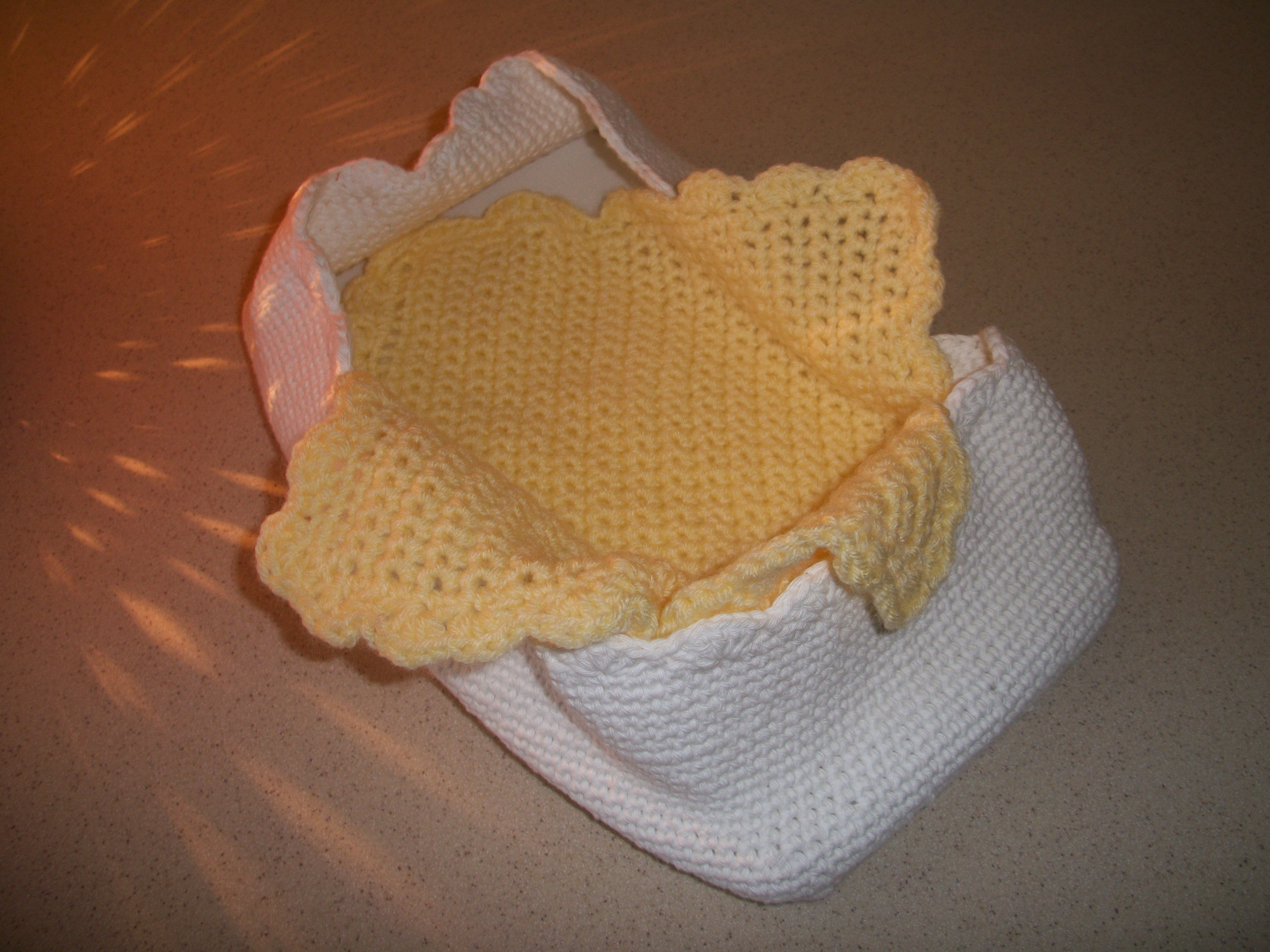
A cuddle cot

Fetal death in utero does not present an immediate health risk to the pregnant woman. Labour will usually begin spontaneously after two weeks, so the pregnant woman may choose to wait and bear the fetal remains vaginally. After two weeks, the pregnant woman is at risk of developing blood clotting problems, and labor induction is recommended at this point. In many cases, the pregnant woman will find the idea of carrying the dead fetus traumatizing and will elect to have labor induced. Caesarean birth is not recommended unless complications develop during vaginal birth. How healthcare workers communicate the diagnosis of stillbirth may have a long-lasting and deep impact on parents. People need to heal physically after a stillbirth just as they do emotionally. In Ireland, for example, people are offered a 'cuddle cot', a cooled cot which allows them to spend several days with their child before burial or cremation.

== Delivery ==
In single stillbirths, common practice is to induce labor for the health of the mother due to possible complications such as exsanguination. Induction and labor can take 48 hours. In the case of various complications such as pre-eclampsia, infections, or multiples (twins), emergency Caesarean may occur.

== Epidemiology ==
Stillbirth rate

The average stillbirth rate in the United States is approximately 1 in 160 births, which is roughly 26,000 stillbirths each year. In Australia, England, Wales, and Northern Ireland, the rate is approximately 1 in every 200 births; in Scotland, 1 in 167. Rates of stillbirth in the United States have decreased by about two-thirds since the 1950s.

The vast majority of stillbirths worldwide (98%) occur in low- and middle-income countries, where medical care can be of low quality or unavailable. Reliable estimates calculate that, yearly, about 2.6 million stillbirths occur worldwide during the third trimester. Stillbirths were previously not included in the Global Burden of Disease Study, which records worldwide deaths from various causes until 2015.

== Society and culture ==
The way people view stillbirths has changed dramatically over time; however, their economic and psychosocial impact is often underestimated. In the early 20th century, when a stillbirth occurred, the baby was taken and discarded and the parents were expected to immediately let go of the attachment and try for another baby. In many countries, parents are expected by friends and family members to recover from the loss of an unborn baby very soon after it happens. Societally-mediated complications such as financial hardship and depression are among the more common results. A stillbirth can have significant psychological effects on the parents, notably causing feelings of guilt in the mother. Further psycho-social effects on parents include apprehension, anger, feelings of worthlessness and not wanting to interact with other people, with these reactions sometimes carried over into pregnancies that occur after the stillbirth. Men also suffer psychologically after stillbirth, although they are more likely to hide their grief and feelings and try to act strong, with the focus on supporting their partner.

=== Legal definitions ===
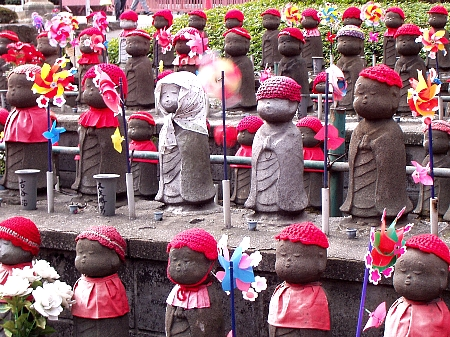
In Japan, statues of Jizō, a Buddhist patron deity of children, memorialize stillborn babies.

==== Australia ====
In Australia, stillbirth is defined as a baby born with no signs of life that weighs more than 400 grams, or more than 20 weeks in gestation. They legally must have their birth registered.

==== Austria ====
In Austria, a stillbirth is defined as a birth of a child of at least 500g weight without vital signs, e.g., blood circulation, breath, or muscle movements.

==== Canada ====
Beginning in 1959, "the definition of a stillbirth was revised to conform, in substance, to the definition of fetal death recommended by the World Health Organization". The definition of "fetal death" promulgated by the World Health Organization in 1950 is as follows:

"Fetal death" means death prior to the complete expulsion or extraction from its mother of a product of human conception, irrespective of the duration of pregnancy, and which is not an induced termination of pregnancy. The death is indicated by the fact that after such expulsion or extraction, the fetus does not breathe or show any other evidence of life, such as beating of the heart, pulsation of the umbilical cord, or definite movement of voluntary muscles. Heartbeats are to be distinguished from transient cardiac contractions; respirations are to be distinguished from fleeting respiratory efforts or gasps.

==== Germany ====
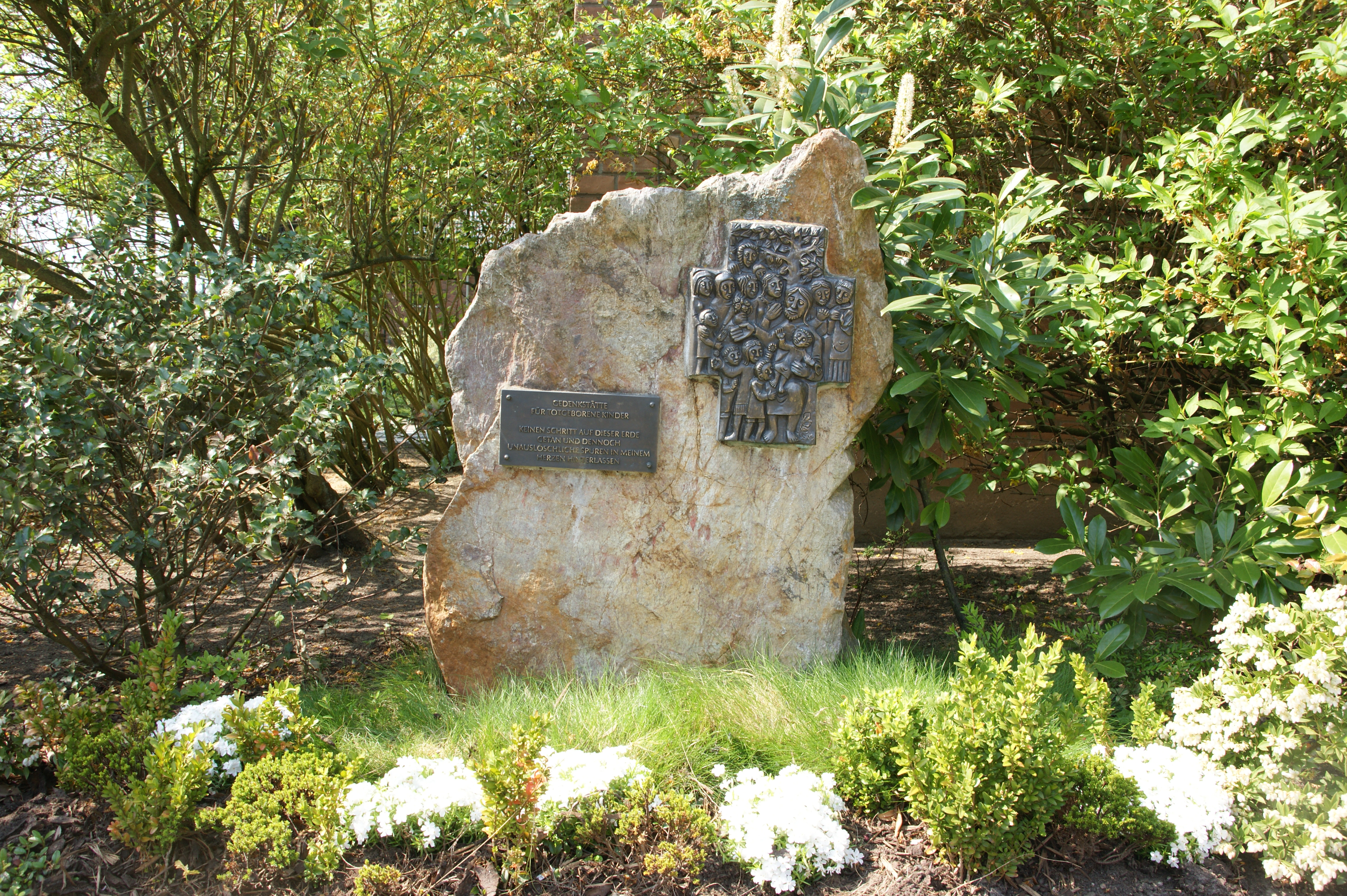
Monument to stillborn babies in Germany

In Germany, a stillbirth is defined as the birth of a child of at least 500g weight without blood circulation or breath. Details for burial vary among the federal states.

==== Ireland ====
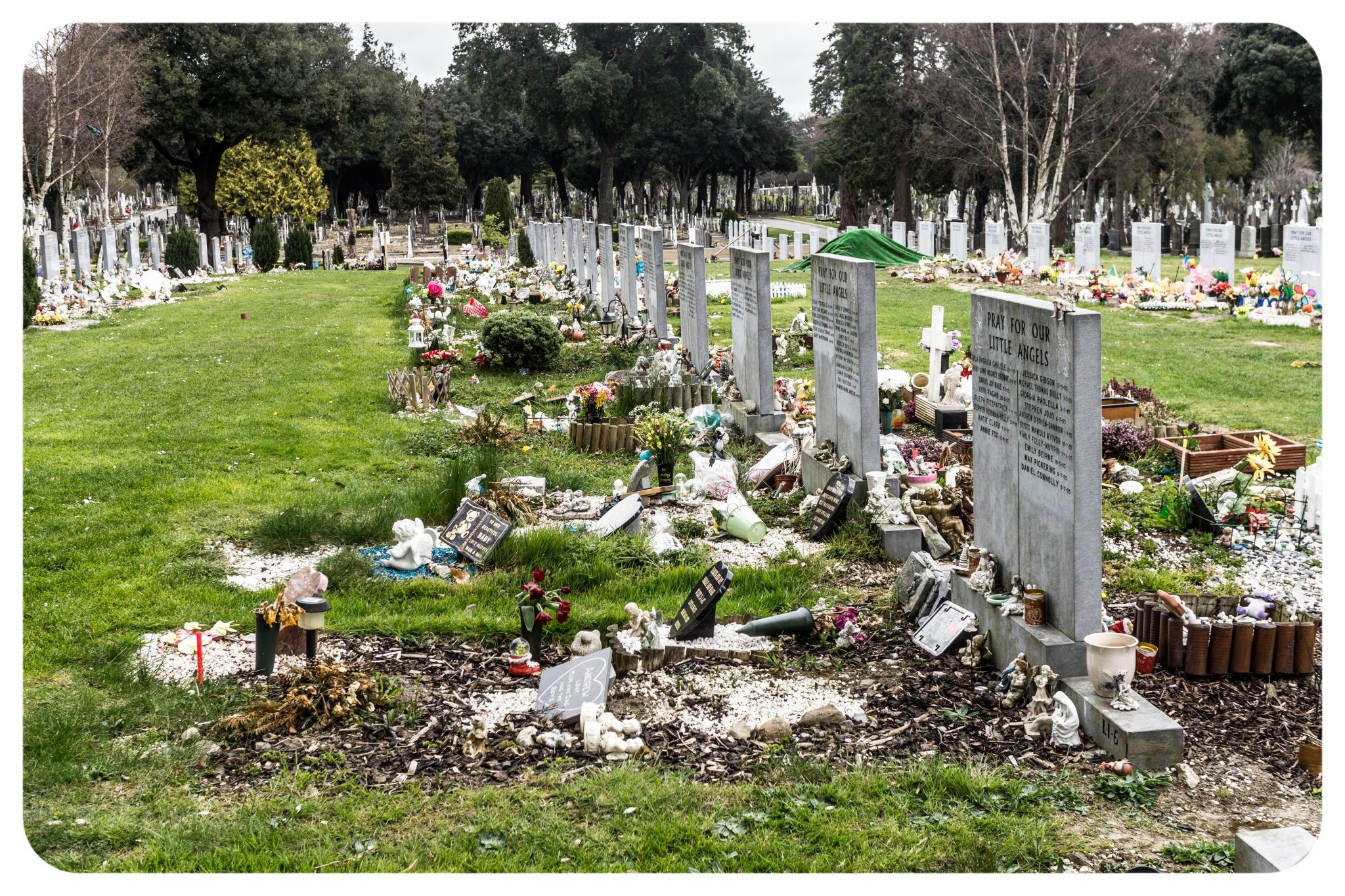
At one time, this Angels' Plot was one of the few burial grounds for stillborn babies that was consecrated by the Catholic Church in Ireland.

Since 1 January 1995, stillbirths occurring in Ireland must be registered; stillbirths that occurred before that date can also be registered, but evidence is required. For civil registration, s.1 of the Stillbirths Registration Act 1994 refers to "...a child weighing at least 500 grammes, or having reached a gestational age of at least 24 weeks who shows no signs of life."

==== Netherlands ====
In the Netherlands, stillbirth is defined differently by the Central Bureau of Statistics (CBS) and the Dutch Perinatal Registry (Stichting PRN). The birth and mortality numbers from the CBS include all livebirths, regardless of gestational duration, and all stillbirths from 24 weeks of gestation and onwards. In the Perinatal Registry, gestational duration of both liveborn and stillborn children is available. They register all liveborn and stillborn children from 22, 24 or 28 weeks of gestation and onwards (dependent on the report: fetal, neonatal or perinatal mortality). Therefore, data from these institutions on (still)births cannot be compared simply one-on-one.

==== United Kingdom ====
The registration of stillbirths has been required in England and Wales since 1927 and in Scotland since 1939, but is not required in Northern Ireland. Sometimes a pregnancy is terminated deliberately during a late phase, for example, due to a congenital anomaly. UK law requires these procedures to be registered as "stillbirths".

===== England and Wales =====
For the Births and Deaths Registration Act 1926 (as amended), section 12 contains the definition:

"still-born" and "still-birth" shall apply to any child which has issued forth from its mother after the twenty fourth week of pregnancy and which did not at any time after being completely expelled from its mother, breathe or show any other signs of life.

A similar definition is applied within the Births and Deaths Registration Act 1953 (as amended), contained in s.41.

The above definitions apply within those Acts; thus, other legislation will not necessarily be in identical terms.

s.2 of the 1953 Act requires that registration of a birth takes place within 42 days of the birth except where an inquest takes place, or the child has been "found exposed" in which latter case the time limit runs from the time of finding.

Extracts from the register of stillbirths are restricted to those who have obtained consent from the Registrar General for England and Wales.

===== Scotland =====
Section 56(1) of the Registration of Births, Deaths and Marriages (Scotland) Act 1965 (as amended) contains the definition:

"still-born child" means a child which has issued forth from its mother after the twenty-fourth week of pregnancy and which did not at any time after being completely expelled from its mother breathe or show any other signs of life, and the expression "still-birth" shall be construed accordingly

s.21(1) of the same Act requires that:

Except so far as otherwise provided by this section or as may be prescribed, the provisions of this Part of this Act shall, so far as applicable, apply to still-births in like manner as they apply to births of children born alive.

In the general case, s.14 of the Act requires that a birth has to be registered within 21 days of the birth or of the child being found.

Unlike the registers for births, marriages, civil partnerships and deaths, the register of still-births is not open to public access and issue of extracts requires the permission of the Registrar General for Scotland.

===== Northern Ireland =====
In Northern Ireland, the Births and Deaths Registration (Northern Ireland) Order 1976, as amended contains the definition:

"still-birth" means the complete expulsion or extraction from its mother after the twenty-fourth week of pregnancy of a child which did not at any time after being completely expelled or extracted breathe or show any other evidence of life.

Registration of stillbirths can be made by a relative or certain other persons involved with the stillbirth. It is not compulsory to do so. Registration takes place with the District Registrar for the Registration District where the still-birth occurred or for the District in which the mother is resident. A stillbirth certificate will be issued to the registrant, with further copies only available to those obtaining official consent for their issue. Registration may be made within three months of the stillbirth.

==== United States ====
In the United States, there is no standard definition of the term 'stillbirth'.

In the U.S., the Born-Alive Infants Protection Act of 2002 specifies that any breathing, heartbeat, pulsating umbilical cord, or confirmed voluntary muscle movement indicates live birth rather than stillbirth.

The Centers for Disease Control and Prevention collects statistical information on "live births, fetal deaths, and induced termination of pregnancy" from 57 reporting areas in the United States. Each reporting area has different guidelines and definitions for what is being reported; many do not use the term "stillbirth" at all. The federal guidelines suggest (on page 1) that fetal death and stillbirth can be interchangeable terms. The CDC definition of "fetal death" is based on the definition promulgated by the World Health Organization in 1950 (see section above on Canada). Researchers are learning more about the long term psychiatric sequelae of traumatic birth and believe the effects may be intergenerational

The CDC states that, in the US, a stillbirth is typically defined as the loss of a fetus during or after the 20th week of pregnancy. Stillbirths can further be classified as early (occurring between week 20 and week 27 of pregnancy), late (occurring between week 28 and week 36 of pregnancy), and term (occurring during or after week 37 of pregnancy). In the US, approximately 21,000 babies are stillborn annually, and stillbirth affects around 1 in 175 births.

The federal guidelines recommend reporting those fetal deaths whose birth weight is over 12.5 oz (350 g), or those more than 20 weeks of gestation. Forty-one areas use a definition very similar to the federal definition, thirteen areas use a shortened definition of fetal death, and three areas have no formal definition of fetal death. Only 11 areas specifically use the term 'stillbirth', often synonymously with late fetal death; however, they are split between whether stillbirths are "irrespective of the duration of pregnancy", or whether some age or weight constraint is applied. A movement in the U.S. has changed how stillbirths are now documented through vital records. Previously, only the deaths were reported. However, 27 states have enacted legislation that offers some variation of a birth certificate as an option for parents who choose to pay for one. Parents may not claim a tax exemption for stillborn infants, even if a birth certificate is offered. To claim an exemption, the birth must be certified as live, even if the infant only lives for a very brief period.

After Dobbs v. Jackson Women's Health Organization, some states restricted women's access to abortion, even when the pregnancy is nonviable. Legal restrictions on medications and procedures that have been used for abortions may also impact treatment options for women undergoing a miscarriage or stillbirth.

== See also ==
- Coffin birth
- Perinatal death
- Smoking and pregnancy
- Sands (charity)
