= Kick chart =

Graph to record foetal activity

A kick chart is a form or graph used by a pregnant woman in the later stages to record the activity of her fetus. If too few kicks are felt within a specified time (usually 12 hours) this could indicate a problem.

A frequent question posed by midwives is how "many times has the baby kicked in the last twelve hours?" The unborn foetus should move five times per hour, or ten times in any twelve-hour period. In the UK this is regarded as best indication of the health of the baby from the second trimester.

Once routine, use of these charts has declined, since women often forgot to complete them and fetal movement patterns are very varied, leading to unnecessary concern.

== Foetal kick counters ==
A more recent trend in the United Kingdom has been the replacement of the kick chart with jewelry-based counters. A pregnancy bracelet is a wearable form of kick counter.

The bracelets available work on similar principles: the baby kicks, the mother moves a marker. The idea is that this is more practical than using a pen and paper.

The two most widely advertised bracelets are currently undergoing the patent application process.

== See also ==
- Pregnancy
- Stillbirth
