= Nipple stimulation =

Human sexual practice

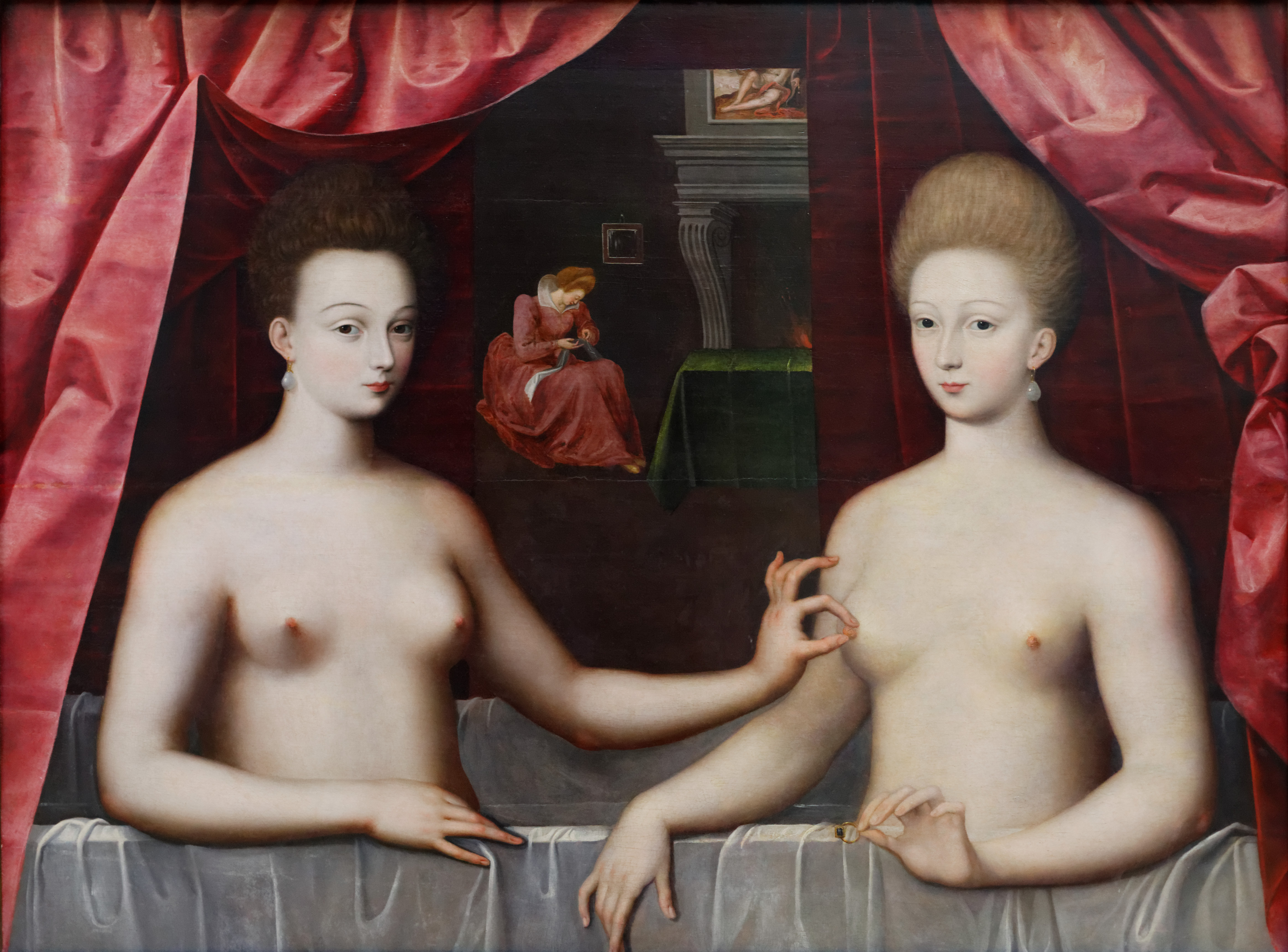
Gabrielle d'Estrées's rouged nipple is tweaked by her sister, the Duchess of Villars, circa 1600.

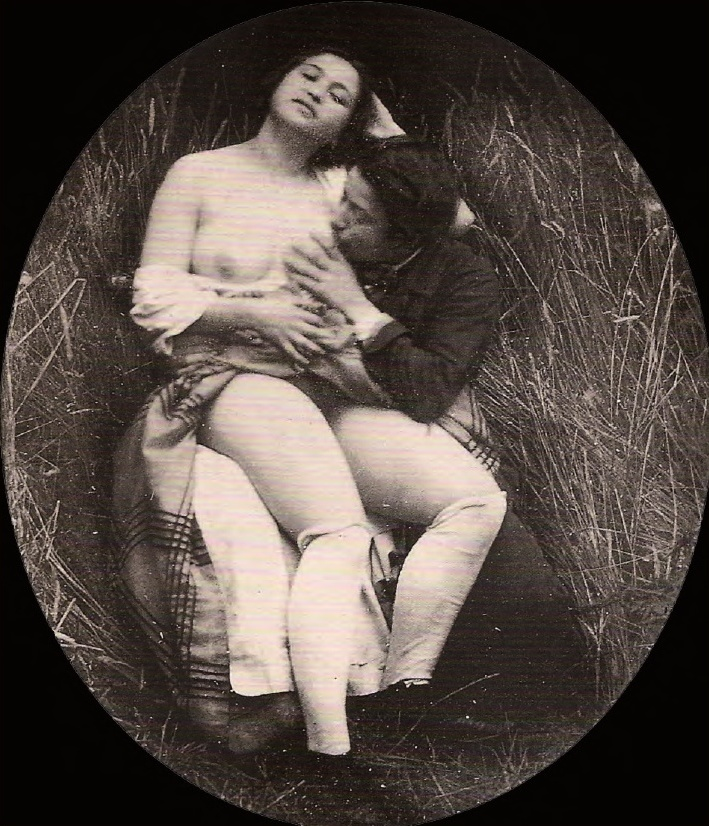
Man engaged in oral nipple stimulation

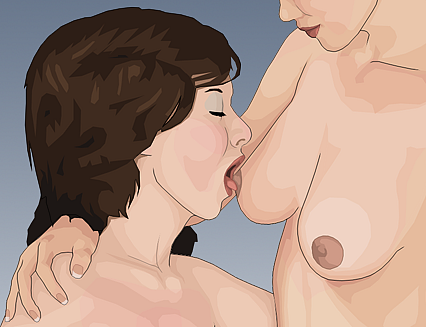
Oral nipple stimulation

Nipple stimulation or breast stimulation is stimulation of the breast. Stimulation may be by breastfeeding, sexual activity, an indirect non-sexual response, or kissing the nipple. As part of sexual activity, the practice may be performed upon, or by, people of any gender or sexual orientation. It may occur with the use of fingers, orally, such as by sucking or licking, as well as by use of an object.

Nipple stimulation may produce sexual excitement, and nipple erection can be an indicator of an individual's sexual arousal. Adult women and men report that breast stimulation may be used to both initiate and enhance sexual arousal, and a few women report experiencing orgasm from nipple stimulation.

== Development and anatomy ==
Male and female breasts, nipples and areolas develop similarly in the fetus and during infancy. At puberty, the male's breasts remain rudimentary but the female's develop further, mainly due to the presence of estrogen and progesterone. Smaller female breasts, however, are more sensitive than larger ones.

== Physiological response ==
Breasts, and especially the nipples, are erogenous zones. Nipple stimulation may result in sexual arousal, and erect nipples can be an indicator of an individual's sexual arousal. The individual's sexual partner may find such erection erotically stimulating. A survey in 2006 found that sexual arousal in about 82% of young females and 52% of young males occurs or is enhanced by direct stimulation of nipples, with only 7–8% reporting that it decreased their arousal.

The stimulation of women's nipples from suckling, including breastfeeding, promotes the production and release of oxytocin and prolactin. Besides creating maternal feelings, it also decreases a woman's anxiety and increases feelings of bonding and trust. Oxytocin is linked to sexual arousal and pair bonding, but researchers are divided on whether breastfeeding commonly incites sexual feelings. Nipple erection during sexual arousal or breastfeeding are both caused by the release of oxytocin. Nipple erection is due to the contraction of smooth muscle under the control of the autonomic nervous system, and is a product of the pilomotor reflex which causes goose bumps.

Nipple stimulation can be achieved using the mouth, fingers or sex toys specifically designed for the purpose. Examples include nipple clamps as well as miniature versions of suction cups, vibrators, floggers and riding crops.

Few women report experiencing orgasm from nipple stimulation. Before Komisaruk et al.'s functional magnetic resonance (fMRI) research on nipple stimulation in 2011, reports of women achieving orgasm from nipple stimulation relied solely on anecdotal evidence. Komisaruk's study was the first to map the female genitals onto the sensory portion of the brain; it indicates that sensation from the nipples travels to the same part of the brain as sensations from the vagina, clitoris and cervix, and that these reported orgasms are genital orgasms caused by nipple stimulation, and may be directly linked to the genital sensory cortex ("the genital area of the brain").

In Patterns of Sexual Behavior, a 1951 analysis of 191 traditional cultures, the researchers noted that stimulation of the female breast by the male before sex "seemed absent in all subhuman forms, although it is common among the members of many different human societies."

== Psychological response ==
Studies have shown that nipple erection can significantly impact people's perceptions of and behavior towards women. A recent psychological study found that the presence of nipple erection can influence people's views of a woman's intelligence, morality, and sexuality. Another study found that men are more willing to help women with erect nipples, which could indicate that men view women with nipple erection as more sexually attractive and approachable.

== See also ==
- Breast fetishism
- Contraction stress test
- Erotic lactation
- Fingering (sexual act)
- Mammary intercourse
