= Index of human sexuality articles =

Human sexuality covers a broad range of topics, including the physiological, psychological, social, cultural, political, philosophical, ethical, moral, theological, legal and spiritual or religious aspects of sex and human sexual behavior.

Articles pertaining to human sexuality include:

== !$@ ==
- $pread

== A ==
- A Mind of Its Own: A Cultural History of the Penis
- A Return to Love
- Abasiophilia
- Abortion
- Abstinence
- Abstinence-only sex education
- Abstinence, be faithful, use a condom
- Accidental incest
- Acrosome
- Acrosome reaction
- Acrotomophilia
- Activin and inhibin
- Adolescent sexuality
- Adolescent sexuality in the United States
- Adult Check
- Adult Industry Medical Health Care Foundation
- Adult Verification System
- Adult video arcade
- Adult video game
- Adultery
- Advanced maternal age
- Affair
- Affection
- Affectional bond
- Affectional orientation
- African-American culture and sexual orientation
- Agalmatophilia
- Age at first marriage
- Age disparity in sexual relationships
- Age of consent
- Age-of-consent reform
- Ageplay
- Ages of consent in Africa
- Ages of consent in Asia
- Ages of consent in Europe
- Ages of consent in North America
- Ages of consent in Oceania
- Ages of consent in South America
- AIDS
- AIDS in the pornographic film industry
- Alan Soble
- Albanian sworn virgins
- Alcohol and sex
- All About Love: New Visions
- Alt porn
- Alt.sex
- Alt.sex.stories
- American Association of Sexuality Educators, Counselors and Therapists
- American Birth Control League
- American Fertility Association
- American Institute of Bisexuality
- American Journal of Sexuality Education
- Anal beads
- Anal fingering
- Anal masturbation
- Anal sex
- Anaphrodisiac
- Anarchism and issues related to love and sex
- Anatomically correct doll
- Andrology
- Androphilia and gynephilia
- Anilingus
- Animal roleplay
- Anovulatory cycle
- Anthropophilia in animals
- Anti-pornography movement
- Antisexualism
- Aphanisis
- Aphrodisiac
- Apotemnophilia
- Aquaphilia (fetish)
- Armpit fetishism
- Arse Elektronika
- Artificial hymen
- Asexuality
- Asherman's syndrome
- Ass to mouth
- Assortative mating
- Astroglide
- Athenian pederasty
- AtomAge
- Attachment in adults
- Attachment in children
- Attachment measures
- Attachment theory
- Attraction to disability
- Attraction to transgender people
- Autagonistophilia
- Autassassinophilia
- Autoerotic fatality
- Autoeroticism
- Autosadism
- Ayoni

== B ==
- Balloon fetish
- Banjee
- Bare Behind Bars
- Bareback (sexual act)
- Barley-Break
- Baseball metaphors for sex
- BDSM
- BDSM and the law
- BDSM in culture and media
- Beate Uhse-Rotermund
- Beate Uhse Erotic Museum
- Beginning of pregnancy controversy
- Benandanti
- Bend Over Boyfriend
- Benjamin scale
- Berl Kutchinsky
- Beyaz (drug)
- Biastophilia
- Biblical courtship
- Bikini waxing
- Biological sex
- Biology and sexual orientation
- Biology of romantic love
- Birth control
- Birth Control (film)
- Birth Control Council of America
- Birth control movement in the United States
- Birth control sabotage
- Birth dearth
- Birth rate
- Bisexual pornography
- Bisexual pride flag
- Bisexuality
- Blanchard's transsexualism typology
- Blood–testis barrier
- Blood fetishism
- Blue balls
- Blunder Broad
- Bob Champion
- Body inflation
- Body odor and subconscious human sexual attraction
- Boink
- Bokanovsky's process
- Bondage (BDSM)
- Bonk: The Curious Coupling of Science and Sex
- Boot fetishism
- Born-again virgin
- Boston Corbett
- Boston Medical Group
- Boyfriend
- Bracha L. Ettinger
- Breast
- Breast binding
- Breast fetishism
- British Journal of Sexual Medicine
- British Society for the Study of Sex Psychology
- Broken heart
- Brotherly love (philosophy)
- Buddhism and sexual orientation
- Buddhism and sexuality
- Bugchasing
- Bukkake (sexual practice)
- Bundling (tradition)
- Bunga bunga
- Burusera
- Butt plug
- Buttocks
- Buttocks eroticism

== C ==
- Camel toe
- Camgirl
- Candaulism
- Capacitation
- Cass identity model
- Casting couch
- Castration
- Casual relationship
- Casual sex
- Catfight
- Catholic sex abuse cases
- Catholicism and sexuality
- Celibacy
- Certified Sex Therapist
- Chickenhawk (gay slang)
- Chickenhead (sexuality)
- Child-on-child sexual abuse
- Child sex (disambiguation)
- Child sex tourism
- Child sexual abuse
- Child sexuality
- Childbirth
- Choice USA
- Chremastistophilia
- Christian side hug
- Christianity and sexual orientation
- Chronophilia
- Cicisbeo
- Circle jerk (sexual practice)
- Circumcision
- Clinical vampirism
- Clitoral enlargement methods
- Clitoral erection
- Clitoral pump
- Clitoris
- Clitorism
- Clothing fetish
- Club wear
- Co-sleeping
- Cock ring
- Cock and ball torture
- Cockle bread
- Coitus reservatus
- Compassionate love
- Compersion
- Compulsory sterilization
- Concept Foundation
- Concubinage
- Condom
- Condom fatigue
- Condoms, needles, and negotiation
- Conjugal love
- Conjugal visit
- Conscience clause (medical)
- Consecrated virgin
- Consent
- Consent in BDSM
- Constitutional growth delay
- Contraception
- Contraception in the Republic of Ireland
- Contraceptive security
- Coolidge effect
- Coprophilia
- Corrective rape
- Cortical reaction
- Couple costume
- Courtly love
- Courtship
- Courtship disorder
- Covert incest
- Crab louse
- Creampie (sexual act)
- Cretan pederasty
- Crime of passion
- Criminal transmission of HIV
- Cross dressing
- Cruising for sex
- Crush fetish
- Crystallization (love)
- Cuban National Center for Sex Education
- Cuckold
- Cuckquean
- Cuddle party
- Cum shot
- Cunnilingus
- Cunt
- Cupboard love
- Curial response to Catholic sex abuse cases
- Cutty-sark (witch)
- Cyber sex
- Cybersex
- Cytoplasmic incompatibility
- Cytoplasmic transfer

== D ==
- Dacryphilia
- Damsel in distress
- Dartos fascia
- Date rape
- Davian behavior
- David Reimer
- Day of Conception
- De amore (Andreas Capellanus)
- Dear John letter
- Debagging
- Decrement table
- Deep-throating
- Delayed ejaculation
- Delayed puberty
- Demographics of sexual orientation
- Dendrophilia (paraphilia)
- Dental dam
- Desire (emotion)
- Desire discrepancy
- Deus caritas est
- Dhat syndrome
- Dildo
- Diotima of Mantinea
- Dippoldism
- Dirty Sanchez (sexual act)
- Dirty talk
- Discipline (BDSM)
- Document 12-571-3570
- Dogging (sexual slang)
- Doll fetish
- Domination and submission
- Dominatrix
- Domnei
- "Don't Stand So Close to Me"
- Don Juan
- Donkey punch
- DontDateHimGirl.com
- Douche
- Downblouse
- Droit du seigneur
- Dry enema
- Dry sex
- Dual protection
- Dutch Society for Sexual Reform
- Dydd Santes Dwynwen
- Dyspareunia

== E ==
- Easterlin hypothesis
- Ecclesiastical response to Catholic sex abuse cases
- Écriture féminine
- Edging (sexual practice)
- Education for Citizenship (Spain)
- Effects of pornography
- Effeminacy
- Egg cell
- Ego-dystonic sexual orientation
- Ejaculation
- Eli Coleman
- Élisabeth Badinter
- Emasculation
- Embryo transfer
- Emergency contraceptive availability by country
- Emetophilia
- Emotional affair
- Emotional intimacy
- Encyclopedia of Pleasure
- Endocrinology
- Enema
- Enjo kōsai
- Environment and sexual orientation
- Enzyte
- Ephebophilia
- Erectile dysfunction
- Erection
- Erogenous zone
- Eros (concept)
- Erotic Awards
- Erotic electrostimulation
- Erotic humiliation
- Erotic hypnosis
- Erotic lactation
- Erotic literature
- Erotic massage
- Erotic sexual denial
- Erotic spanking
- Erotica
- Eroticism
- Eroto-comatose lucidity
- Erotolepsy
- Erotomania
- Erotophilia
- Erotophobia
- Erotosexual
- Eskimo kissing
- Estrogen
- Ethnic pornography
- Eve Kosofsky Sedgwick
- Evolutionary psychology
- Ex-gay movement
- Exhibitionism
- Exoletus
- ExtenZe

== F ==
- Facesitting
- Facial
- Falling in love
- Fallopian tubes
- Family planning
- Family planning in India
- Family planning in Iran
- Family planning in Pakistan
- Fans of X-Rated Entertainment
- Fat fetishism
- Fear of commitment
- Felching
- Fellatio
- Female condom
- Female copulatory vocalization
- Female ejaculation
- Female genital cutting
- Female hysteria
- Female infertility
- Female reproductive system
- Female sex tourism
- Female sexual arousal disorder
- Female sodomy
- Female submission
- Feminism
- Feminist sex wars
- Feminist sexology
- Feminist views of pornography
- Feminist views on BDSM
- Feminization (activity)
- Fertility
- Fertility-development controversy
- Fertility and intelligence
- Fertility rite
- Fertility symbol
- Fetish magazine
- Fetish model
- Fetus
- Fictosexuality
- Fingering
- Fisting
- Fixation (psychology)
- Fleshlight
- Flirting
- Flogging
- Follicular phase
- Food and sexuality
- Food play
- Foot fetishism
- Footjob
- Forced orgasm
- Foreplay
- Foreskin
- Foreskin restoration
- Formicophilia
- Fornication
- Foursome (group sex)
- Foxy boxing
- Frank Harris
- Fraternal birth order and male sexual orientation
- Free love
- Free Speech Coalition
- Free union
- French kiss
- Friend zone
- Frot
- Frotteurism
- Fuck
- Fuck for Forest
- Fur massage

== G ==
- Gametangium
- Gamete
- Gametogenesis
- Gang bang
- Gang bang pornography
- Gang rape
- Gangbang
- Gay
- Gay bomb
- Gay Kids
- Gay pornography
- Geeta Nargund
- Gender
- Gender and crime
- Gender apartheid
- Gender identity
- Gender identity disorder
- Gender identity disorder in children
- Gender paradigm
- Gender segregation and Islam
- Genetic sexual attraction
- Genital corpuscles
- Genital modification and mutilation
- Genital piercing
- Genital play
- Genital wart
- Genitourinary medicine
- Genophobia
- George Santayana
- Georges Bataille
- Geriatric sexology
- German Society for Social-Scientific Sexuality Research
- Gerontophilia
- Gestation period
- Giles' theory of sexual desire
- Girlfriend
- Girlfriend experience
- Glans
- Gloria E. Anzaldúa
- Glory hole
- Glove fetishism
- Gofraid Donn
- Gokkun
- Golden Age of Porn
- Gonadarche
- Gonadotropin
- Gonadotropin preparations
- Gonocyte
- Gonorrhea
- Gratification disorder
- Greek love
- Greek words for love
- Griselda Pollock
- Groping
- Gross reproduction rate
- Grotesque body
- Group sex
- Groupie
- Growing Up (1971 film)
- Guy Hocquenghem
- Gynaecology
- Gynoecium
- Gynophobia

== H ==
- Habitual abortion
- Hair fetishism
- Haitian Vodou and sexual orientation
- Hand fetishism
- Handedness and sexual orientation
- Handjob
- Hare Krishna movement and sexual orientation
- Harmful to Minors
- Harry Crookshank
- Hatred
- Head shaving
- Heather Corinna
- Heavy petting
- Hebephilia
- Heihaizi
- Hélène Cixous
- Hentai
- Hepatitis
- Herpes simplex virus
- Herpes support groups
- Heteroflexible
- Heterosexual–homosexual continuum
- Heterosexuality
- Hey Nineteen
- Hickey
- Hierophilia
- Hijra (South Asia)
- Hirsutophilia
- History of attachment theory
- History of erotic depictions
- History of evolutionary psychology
- History of homosexuality
- History of human sexuality
- History of masturbation
- History of narcissism
- History of prostitution
- History of sex in India
- HIV
- Hogging (sexual practice)
- Homoeroticism
- Homophobia
- Homosexuality
- Homosexuality and psychology
- Hostile work environment
- Hot or Not
- House party
- How to Have Sex in an Epidemic: One Approach
- Hug
- Hugs and kisses
- Human anus
- Human bonding
- Human female sexuality
- Human fertilization
- Human gonad
- Human male sexuality
- Human penis
- Human population control
- Human reproduction
- Human reproductive system
- Human sexual activity
- Human sexual response cycle
- Human sexuality
- Human sterilization (surgical procedure)
- Hybristophilia
- Hydatid of Morgagni
- Hydrocele testis
- Hyperactivation
- Hypergamy
- Hypergonadism
- Hypersexual disorder
- Hypersexuality
- Hypoactive sexual desire disorder
- Hypogonadism
- Hyposexuality

== I ==
- Ideal Marriage: Its Physiology and Technique
- Identity (social science)
- Imagery of nude celebrities
- Immanuel Kant
- Impact play
- Implantation (human embryo)
- Imprinting (psychology)
- In Praise of the Stepmother
- In vitro fertilisation
- Incest
- Incest in popular culture
- Income and fertility
- Indecent exposure
- Index of BDSM articles
- Infatuation
- Infertility
- Infidelity
- Inis Beag
- Insemination
- Inside Deep Throat
- Institut für Sexualwissenschaft
- Institute for Advanced Study of Human Sexuality
- Instruction and Advice for the Young Bride
- Intercrural sex
- Interferon tau
- International Academy of Sex Research
- International Fetish Day
- International Mr. Leather
- Internet addiction disorder
- Internet pornography
- Internet relationship
- Interpersonal attraction
- Interracial personals
- Intersex
- Intersex flag
- Intersex human rights
- Intimate relationship
- Irrumatio
- Is the School House the Proper Place to Teach Raw Sex?
- Ishq
- Islam and sexual orientation
- Islamic sexual jurisprudence
- It's Perfectly Normal
- It's So Amazing
- It girl

== J ==
- Jacques Hassoun
- Jacques Lacan
- Jailbait
- Jealousy
- Jewish views on love
- Jewish views on marriage
- John D'Emilio
- John Sutcliffe (designer)
- John William Lloyd
- Jolan Chang
- Jonathan David Katz
- Josephine Mutzenbacher
- Jouissance
- Judaism and sexual orientation
- Judith Butler
- Julia Kristeva

== K ==
- K-Y Jelly
- Kagema
- Kama sutra
- Kanashimi no Belladonna
- Kegel exercise
- Ken Marcus
- Khosrow and Shirin
- Kidding Aside
- KinK
- Kinky sex
- Kinsey Institute for Research in Sex, Gender, and Reproduction
- Kinsey scale
- Kiss
- Kiss chase
- Kissing traditions
- Kizzy: Mum at 14
- Klein Sexual Orientation Grid
- Klismaphilia
- Koro (medicine)
- Kukeri

== L ==
- L word
- Lack (manque)
- Lactation
- Lafayette Morehouse
- Laskey, Jaggard and Brown v United Kingdom
- Latent homosexuality
- Latex and PVC fetishism
- Latex clothing
- Lawrence v. Texas
- Layla and Majnun
- Leather fetishism
- Leather Pride flag
- Leather subculture
- Legal objections to pornography in the United States
- Legal recognition of intersex people
- Lesbian
- Lesbian erotica
- Lesbianism
- Leydig cell
- LGBT
- LGBT sex education
- LGBT themes in speculative fiction
- LGBTI Health Summit
- Li Yannian (musician)
- Libertine
- Libido
- Life partner
- Limbic resonance
- Limbic revision
- Limerence
- Lingerie
- List of anarchist pornographic projects and models
- List of BDSM equipment
- List of BDSM organizations
- List of bondage positions
- List of fertility deities
- List of films that most frequently use the word "fuck"
- List of hentai authors
- List of homologues of the human reproductive system
- List of PAN dating software
- List of paraphilias
- List of pornographic book publishers
- List of pornographic magazines
- List of prostitutes and courtesans
- List of sex positions
- List of sexology journals
- List of sexology organizations
- List of sexual slang
- List of sovereign states and dependent territories by fertility rate
- List of topics on sexual ethics
- Living and Growing
- Living apart together
- Lolita
- London amora
- Long-acting reversible contraceptive
- Lookism
- Lost Girls (graphic novel)
- Lotion play
- Love
- Love-in
- Love–hate relationship
- Love & Respect
- Love (sculpture)
- Love addiction
- Love at first sight
- Love dart
- Love Is...
- Love letter
- Love magic
- Love padlocks
- Love styles
- Love triangle
- Lovegety
- Lovemap
- Lovesickness
- Loyalty
- Luce Irigaray
- Lust
- Lust murder

== M ==
- Macrophilia
- Magnus Hirschfeld Medal
- Making out
- Making sense of abstinence
- Male accessory gland
- Male dominance (BDSM)
- Male infertility
- Male prostitute
- Male reproductive system
- Male submission
- Male waxing
- Mama-san
- Mammary intercourse
- Mandarin Chinese profanity
- Manual sex
- Marital rape
- Marquis de Sade
- Marriage
- Marriage and Morals
- Marriageable age
- Married Love
- Masters and Johnson
- Masters and Johnson Institute
- Masturbate-a-thon
- Masturbation
- Mat (Russian profanity)
- Maternal bond
- Maternal health
- Mechanics of human sexuality
- Mechanophilia
- Media coverage of Catholic sexual abuse cases
- Medical abortion
- Medical fetishism
- Meet market
- Men who have sex with men
- Ménage à trois
- Menarche
- Menstruation
- Meretrix
- Michael Uebel
- Michel Foucault
- Mighty Jill Off
- Mile high club
- MILF Island
- MILF pornography
- Minors and abortion
- Mirror stage
- Misattribution of arousal
- Misogyny
- Mister Leather Europe
- Mistress (lover)
- Modern primitive
- Monique Wittig
- Monogamy
- Monosexuality
- Mosley v News Group Newspapers
- Mosley v United Kingdom
- Muscle worship
- Mutual masturbation
- My Mom's Having a Baby (ABC Afterschool Special)
- Mysophilia

== N ==
- Naked Ambition: An R Rated Look at an X Rated Industry
- Naked Science
- Naked Women's Wrestling League
- Name of the Father
- Nanpa
- Narcissistic parents
- Narratophilia
- National Birth Control League
- National Gamete Donation Trust
- National Longitudinal Study of Adolescent Health
- National Sexuality Resource Center
- National Survey of Sexual Health and Behavior
- Natural fertility
- Navel fetishism
- Necrophilia
- Neotantra
- Net reproduction rate
- Neuroscience and sexual orientation
- New relationship energy
- Nice guy
- Nidamental gland
- Nightwork: Sexuality, Pleasure, and Corporate Masculinity in a Tokyo Hostess Club
- Nin-imma
- Nipple
- Nipple clamp
- No Kidding!
- No Secrets (Adult Protection)
- Non-heterosexual
- Non-penetrative sex
- North American Man/Boy Love Association
- Nose fetishism
- Nyotaimori

== O ==
- Object sexuality
- Objet petit a
- Obscene phone call
- Obscenity
- Obsessive love
- Obstetrics
- Oculophilia
- Odalisque
- Odaxelagnia
- Omorashi
- On-again, off-again relationship
- Oncofertility Consortium
- One-child policy
- One sex two sex theory
- OneChild
- OneTaste
- Online dating service
- Oocyte selection
- Oogamy
- Open relationship
- Operation Spanner
- Opportunistic breeders
- Oragenitalism
- Oral sex
- Orgasm
- Orgy
- Othermother
- Otto Gross
- Our Bodies, Ourselves
- Our Whole Lives
- Outline of human sexuality
- Outline of relationships
- Ovary
- Ovotestis

== P ==
- Paddle (spanking)
- Pansexual
- Pansexual Pride flag
- Pansexuality
- Paraphilia
- Paraphilic infantilism
- Partialism
- Party and play
- Paternal bond
- Pearl Index
- Pearl necklace (sexual act)
- Pederasty
- Pederasty in ancient Greece
- Pedophilia
- Peer Health Exchange
- Pegging (sexual practice)
- Pelvic congestion syndrome
- Penile fracture
- Penile plethysmograph
- Penile implant
- Penile-vaginal intercourse
- Penis captivus
- Penis enlargement
- Penis extension
- Penis sleeve
- People v. Jovanovic
- Perineum
- Period of viability
- Persistent genital arousal disorder
- Personal lubricant
- Perversion
- Perversion for Profit
- Peter Abelard
- Petroleum jelly
- Peyronie's disease
- Phalloorchoalgolagnia
- Phallus
- Philosophy of love
- Philosophy of sex
- Phone sex
- Physical attractiveness
- Physical intimacy
- Physiology
- Pillow talk
- Pinafore eroticism
- Piquerism
- Platonic love
- Play piercing
- Playboy (lifestyle)
- Playgirl
- Playing doctor
- Plietesials
- Plurisexuality
- Plushophilia
- Polyamory
- Polyfidelity
- Polymorphous perversity
- Polysexuality
- Pompoir
- POPLINE
- Population Council
- Porcine zona pellucida
- Porn groove
- Porn Sunday
- Pornographic film actor
- Pornography
- Pornography addiction
- Pornography in Italy
- Pornophobia
- Pornosonic
- Post-coital tristesse
- Post Office (game)
- Postorgasmic illness syndrome
- Precocious puberty
- Pregnancy
- Pregnancy fetishism
- Pregnancy over age 50
- Premarital sex
- Premature ejaculation
- Premature ovarian failure
- Premenstrual stress syndrome
- Prenatal development
- Prenatal hormones and sexual orientation
- Priapism
- Prick Up Your Ears (Family Guy)
- Primal scene
- Primary and secondary (relationship)
- Prison rape
- Prison sexuality
- Privacy mode
- Private Case
- Promiscuity
- Prostaglandin 2 alpha
- Prostate
- Prostate massage
- Prostitution
- Prostitution in Asia
- Prudence and the Pill
- Psychoanalysis
- Psychology of sexual monogamy
- Psychopathia Sexualis
- Psychosexual disorder
- Pubarche
- Puberty
- Pubic hair
- Public display of affection
- Public indecency
- Public sex
- Puppy love
- Purity test
- Pussy
- Putative father registry

== Q ==
- Queer
- Queer pornography
- Questioning (sexuality and gender)
- Quickie
- Quiverfull

== R ==
- R v Brown
- R v Peacock
- R. v. Hess; R. v. Nguyen
- R. v. Stevens
- Rainbow flag (LGBT movement)
- Randa Mai
- Rape
- Rape by deception
- Rating site
- Rectal prolapse
- Rectum
- Red triangle (family planning)
- Reefer Madness (2003 book)
- Reflectoporn
- Refractory period (sex)
- Regina Lynn
- Relationship breakup
- Religion and sexuality
- Religious views on love
- Religious views on pornography
- Remarriage
- Reproductive health
- Reproductive Health Bill
- Reproductive justice
- Reproductive life plan
- Reproductive medicine
- Reproductive rights
- Reproductive system disease
- Robert Reid-Pharr
- Robot fetishism
- Roger T. Pipe
- Roland Barthes
- Roman Catholic sex abuse cases by country
- Romance
- Romantic friendship
- Romantic love (mental state)
- Rubber fetishism
- Rusty trombone

== S ==
- Sadism and masochism in fiction
- Sadomasochism
- Safe sex
- Salirophilia
- Same gender loving
- San Francisco Armory
- San Francisco Sex Information
- Sanky-panky
- Sarah Kofman
- Savage Grace
- Savage Love
- Schizoanalysis
- Scientology and sexual orientation
- Scopophilia
- Scrotal inflation
- Scrotum
- Seasonal breeder
- Secret admirer
- Secret Museum, Naples
- Section 63 of the Criminal Justice and Immigration Act 2008
- Seduction
- Seduction community
- Seishitsu
- Self-love
- Semen extender
- Sensual play
- Serial monogamy
- Serial rape
- Serosorting
- Service-oriented (sexuality)
- SESAMO
- Settlements and bankruptcies in Catholic sex abuse cases
- Seven minutes in heaven
- Sex-positive feminism
- Sex-positive movement
- Sex Addicts Anonymous
- Sex after pregnancy
- Sex and drugs
- Sex and Love Addicts Anonymous
- Sex and sexuality in speculative fiction
- Sex and the law
- Sex assignment
- Sex at Dawn
- Sex club
- Sex doll
- Sex education
- Sex education in the United States
- Sex in advertising
- Sex in space
- Sex industry
- Sex machine
- Sex magic
- Sex manual
- Sex museum
- Sex organ
- Sex party
- Sex positions
- Sex scandal
- Sex segregation
- Sex shop
- Sex steroid
- Sex strike
- Sex symbol
- Sex therapy
- Sex tourism
- Sex toy
- Sex toy party
- Sex Week at Yale
- Sex work
- Sex worker
- Sex workers' rights
- Sex, gender and the Roman Catholic Church
- Sex: The Revolution
- Sexaholics Anonymous
- Sexercises
- Sexism
- Sexless marriage
- Sexological testing
- Sexology
- Sexting
- Sexual abstinence
- Sexual abuse
- Sexual activity during pregnancy
- Sexual addiction
- Sexual and Reproductive Health Matters
- Sexual anorexia
- Sexual arousal
- Sexual arousal disorder
- Sexual assault
- Sexual Attitude Reassessment
- Sexual attraction
- Sexual bimaturism
- Sexual capital
- Sexual Compulsives Anonymous
- Sexual consent
- Sexual desire
- Sexual dysfunction
- Sexual ethics
- Sexual fantasy
- Sexual fetishism
- Sexual field
- Sexual frustration
- Sexual function
- Sexual harassment
- Sexual health clinic
- Sexual identity
- Sexual Identity Therapy
- Sexual inhibition
- Sexual intercourse
- Sexual intimacy
- Sexual meanings
- Sexual medicine
- Sexual minority
- Sexual misconduct
- Sexual morality
- Sexual narcissism
- Sexual network
- Sexual norm
- Sexual objectification
- Sexual orientation
- Sexual orientation and gender identity at the United Nations
- Sexual orientation and military service
- Sexual orientation and the Canadian military
- Sexual orientation and the military of the Netherlands
- Sexual orientation and the military of the United Kingdom
- Sexual orientation and the United States military
- Sexual orientation change efforts
- Sexual orientation hypothesis
- Sexual partner
- Sexual penetration
- Sexual Personae
- Sexual practices between men
- Sexual practices between women
- Sexual repression
- Sexual reproduction
- Sexual revolution
- Sexual ritual
- Sexual roleplay
- Sexual script
- Sexual selection in human evolution
- Sexual slang
- Sexual stigma
- Sexual stimulation
- Sexual sublimation
- Sexual tension
- Sexual violence
- Sexual Violence: Opposing Viewpoints
- Sexuality and disability
- Sexuality and The Church of Jesus Christ of Latter-day Saints
- Sexuality in ancient Rome
- Sexuality in Ancient Rome
- Sexuality in Christian demonology
- Sexuality in Islam
- Sexuality in Japan
- Sexuality in music videos
- Sexuality in older age
- Sexuality in South Korea
- Sexuality in Star Trek
- Sexuality in China
- Sexuality in the Philippines
- Sexuality Information and Education Council of the United States
- Sexuality of Abraham Lincoln
- Sexuality of Adolf Hitler
- Sexuality of David and Jonathan
- Sexuality of Jesus
- Sexuality of William Shakespeare
- Sexualization
- Sexually active life expectancy
- Sexually suggestive
- Sexually transmitted infection
- Shalom bayit
- Shelf (organization)
- Shemale
- Shettles Method
- Shidduch
- Shoe fetishism
- Short-arm inspection
- Sikhism and sexual orientation
- Sima Qian
- Simone de Beauvoir
- Singles Awareness Day
- Singles event
- Sinthome
- Situational sexual behavior
- Skoptic syndrome
- Sleep sex
- Slut
- Smirting
- Smoking fetishism
- Snowballing (sexual practice)
- Social impact of thong underwear
- Society for the Scientific Study of Sexuality
- Sociobiological theories of rape
- Sociosexual orientation
- Sodomy
- Sodomy law
- Soggy biscuit
- Somnophilia
- Soulmate
- Spandex fetishism
- Spectatoring
- Sperm
- Sperm heteromorphism
- Sperm motility
- Sperm Wars
- Spermalege
- Spermarche
- Spermatheca
- Spermatid
- Spermatogenesis
- Spermatogenesis arrest
- Spermatorrhea
- Spermatozoon
- Spermicide
- Spin the bottle
- Spinster
- Spiritual marriage
- Spirituality
- Spooning (cuddling)
- Sporogenesis
- Stag film
- Stalag fiction
- Star-crossed
- State v. Limon
- Statutory rape
- Stigma (1972 film)
- Stillbirth
- Stimulation of nipples
- Strap-on dildo
- Strip club
- Strip poker
- Stripper
- Sub-replacement fertility
- Sublimation (psychology)
- Sumata
- Surrogate partner
- Survivors Healing Center
- Survivors of Incest Anonymous
- Suzanne Lilar
- Swedish Association for Sexuality Education
- Swing club
- Swinging
- Sybian
- Syphilis

== T ==
- Tamakeri
- Tanner scale
- Tantric sex
- Taoist sexual practices
- Teabagging
- Teenage pregnancy
- Teenage pregnancy and sexual health in the United Kingdom
- Teledildonics
- Testicle
- The ABC of Sex Education for Trainables
- The Abortion Pill (film)
- The birds and the bees
- The Chapman Report
- The Education of Shelby Knox
- The Enchanter
- The Encyclopœdia of Sexual Knowledge
- The Erotic Review
- The Ethical Slut
- The Family Doctor
- The Four Loves
- The G Spot and Other Recent Discoveries About Human Sexuality
- The History of Sexuality
- The Imaginary (psychoanalysis)
- The Little Red Schoolbook
- The Man Who Would Be Queen
- The Seminars of Jacques Lacan
- The Sexual Life of Savages in North-Western Melanesia
- The Symbolic
- The Theory of Flight
- The Trouble With Normal (book)
- Thelarche
- Theology
- Therapeutic abortion
- Threesome
- Thy Neighbor's Wife (book)
- Tickling game
- Timeline of sexual orientation and medicine
- Title X
- Toothing
- Top, bottom and versatile
- Torture Garden (fetish club)
- Total fertility rate
- Total fertility rates by federal subjects of Russia
- Tough love
- Trans woman
- Transactional sex
- Transgender
- Transgender pornography
- Transgender Pride flag
- Transgender sexuality
- Transition nuclear protein
- Transsexualism
- Transvestic fetishism
- Transvestism
- Tribadism
- Tunica albuginea
- Turkey slap
- Twenty Five Years of an Artist
- Two-spirit

== U ==
- UK Adult Film and Television Awards
- Unconditional love
- Unisex
- Unitarian Universalism and sexual orientation
- Unrequited love
- Unsimulated sex in film
- Upskirt
- Urethral intercourse
- Urethral sounding
- Urogenital triangle
- Urolagnia
- Urology
- Urophagia
- Uterine serpin
- Uterus

== V ==
- Vagina
- Vaginal lubrication
- Vaginismus
- Valentine's Day
- Vanilla sex
- Venous leak
- Venus 2000
- Venus Butterfly
- Vibrator
- Violet Blue (author)
- Virginity
- Virginity pledge
- Virginity test
- Virility
- Virtual sex
- Voltaire
- Voluntary Parenthood League
- Vorarephilia
- Voulez-vous coucher avec moi?
- Voyeurism
- Vulnerability and Care Theory of Love
- Vulva

== W ==
- Wakashū
- Walk of shame
- Wanker
- War rape
- Warming lubricant
- Wax play
- Wayne DuMond
- Westermarck effect
- Wet and messy fetishism
- Wet Lubricants
- Wetlook
- Where Do Teenagers Come From?
- Why Is Sex Fun?
- Wildlife contraceptive
- Windmill Theatre
- Womb veil
- Women who have sex with women
- World Association for Sexual Health
- Wreath money

== X ==
- XBIZ
- XBIZ Award
- XRCO Award
- XXXchurch.com

== Y ==
- Yoni
- Youth Internet Safety Survey

== Z ==
- Zestra
- Zina
- Zona pellucida
- Zooerasty
- Zoophilia
- Zoosadism
- Zoroastrianism and sexual orientation
- Zygote
- Zygote intrafallopian transfer

== See also ==
- Outline of human sexuality
