= Sex after pregnancy =

Sex after pregnancy is often delayed for several weeks or months, and may be difficult and painful for women. Painful intercourse is the most common sexual activity-related complication after childbirth. Since there are no guidelines on resuming sexual intercourse after childbirth, the postpartum patients are generally advised to resume sex when they feel comfortable to do so. Injury to the perineum or surgical cuts (episiotomy) to the vagina during childbirth can cause sexual dysfunction. Sexual activity in the postpartum period other than sexual intercourse is possible sooner, but some women experience a prolonged loss of sexual desire after giving birth, which may be associated with postnatal depression. Common issues that may last more than a year after birth are greater desire by the man than the woman, and a worsening of the woman's body image.

== Birth method and injuries ==
Women with damage or tears to their perineum resume sex later than women with an intact perineum, and women who needed perineal sutures report poorer sexual relations. Perineal damage is also associated with painful sex. Not all lacerations or trauma during childbirth cause decreased sexual function, but certain types of lacerations are associated with increased risk of sexual dysfunction. Women who have an anal tear are less likely to have resumed sex after six months and one year, but they have normal sexual function 18 months later.

Assisted vaginal delivery using suction or forceps is correlated with increases in the frequency or severity of painful sex, the delay in resuming sex, and sexual problems. Cesarean section may result in less painful sex during the first 3 months, and there is no difference in sexual function or symptoms by six months. Also, the women who delivered by cesarean section report greater sexual satisfaction relating to vaginal tone six years on.

== Delay before resuming sex ==
Many doctors recommend waiting four to six weeks before resuming sex, to allow the cervix to close, bleeding (known as lochia) to stop, and tears to heal.

A study of women in Turkey found that 42% resumed sexual intercourse within six weeks of giving birth. American and British studies found that at six weeks, 57% of women had resumed sexual intercourse, 82–85% had by three months, and 89–90% had by six months. Another American survey found that masturbation (74%) and oral sex (58%) were begun much more frequently within six weeks than vaginal penetration (34%). Sexual intercourse was resumed by two-thirds of Ugandan women within six months of childbirth, and among Chinese women 52% had resumed sex by two months and 95% had by six months.

== Sexual dysfunction ==
About half the men and women questioned eight months after childbirth in one British study described their sex life as ‘poor’ or ‘not very good’, though another found that 70% of British women and 89% of Taiwanese women were satisfied with their sex life during the postnatal period. Six months after giving birth, one quarter of American women said they had lower sexual sensation, satisfaction, and ability to reach orgasm, and 22% said that sex was painful. More than 80% of British women experienced sexual problems three months after giving birth, and nearly two-thirds at six months, compared to pre-pregnancy levels of 38%. Of Ugandan women who had resumed sex within six months of giving birth, nearly two-thirds experienced vaginal pain and about a third had discharge or bleeding.

Vaginal dryness may occur following giving birth for about three months due to hormonal changes, and breastfeeding women resume sexual intercourse later than those who do not breastfeed. Women who breast-feed are much more likely to report painful sex as well as reduced libido, both due to hormonal changes such as a reduction in levels of estrogen. Women with major trauma reported less desire to be held, touched, or stroked by their partner.

The risk of postpartum sexual dysfunction is increased in those with history of sexual dysfunction prior to pregnancy.

=== Reduced libido ===
Having given birth within the previous year is associated with persistent low sexual desire. More than a third of first-time mothers report a loss of libido at eight months, though only 1 in 7 of experienced mothers have a loss of libido. Women often have a poor body image after giving birth. Women are often uncomfortable with their physical changes after birth, and often want sleep or to have time for themselves, which leads to a changed sexual pattern. Discordance of sexual desire with their partner is frequent. Another potential cause of low libido is postpartum depression; depressed women are less likely to have resumed sex at six months and more likely to report more sexual health problems. Also, those with trauma during pregnancy are more likely to report reduced libido.

Dissatisfaction with the sexual relationship a year after childbirth is associated with a lack of sex early in pregnancy as well as older ages of women, but not with factors relating to pregnancy or birth.

==== In partners ====
A study of found that the sexual desire of partners is often low following the birth. Feelings of intimacy and sexual interest increased sexual desire in co-parents during postpartum period. In contrast, fatigue, stress, partner disinterest, and breastfeeding status decreased the sexual desire in this period.

== Risks ==
A fatal air embolism, when air enters the bloodstream, can occur due to sex shortly after childbirth before the placental bed has healed, particularly if the woman's knees are pressed against her chest, but this is rare. More common complications of having sex early after pregnancy are tears to incisions and infection of the uterus.

Also, early resumption of sexual intercourse after childbirth may predispose patients to the risks associated with short interval pregnancy. The patients who became pregnant within 18 months from the last childbirth are at an increased risk of adverse pregnancy outcomes. To prevent such risks associated with short interval pregnancy, contraception is offered after childbirth.

== Treatment ==
Only 15% of London women who had a postnatal sexual problem reported discussing it with a health professional. In contrast, 59.4% of Ugandan women who had resumed sex and had a sexual problem sought medical assistance. Performing pelvic floor muscle exercise appears to improve sexual function, and painful sex and vaginal dryness can be reduced using different sexual positions and lubricants. 83% of British and 60% of Taiwanese women thought they had sufficient information about sex during the postnatal period.

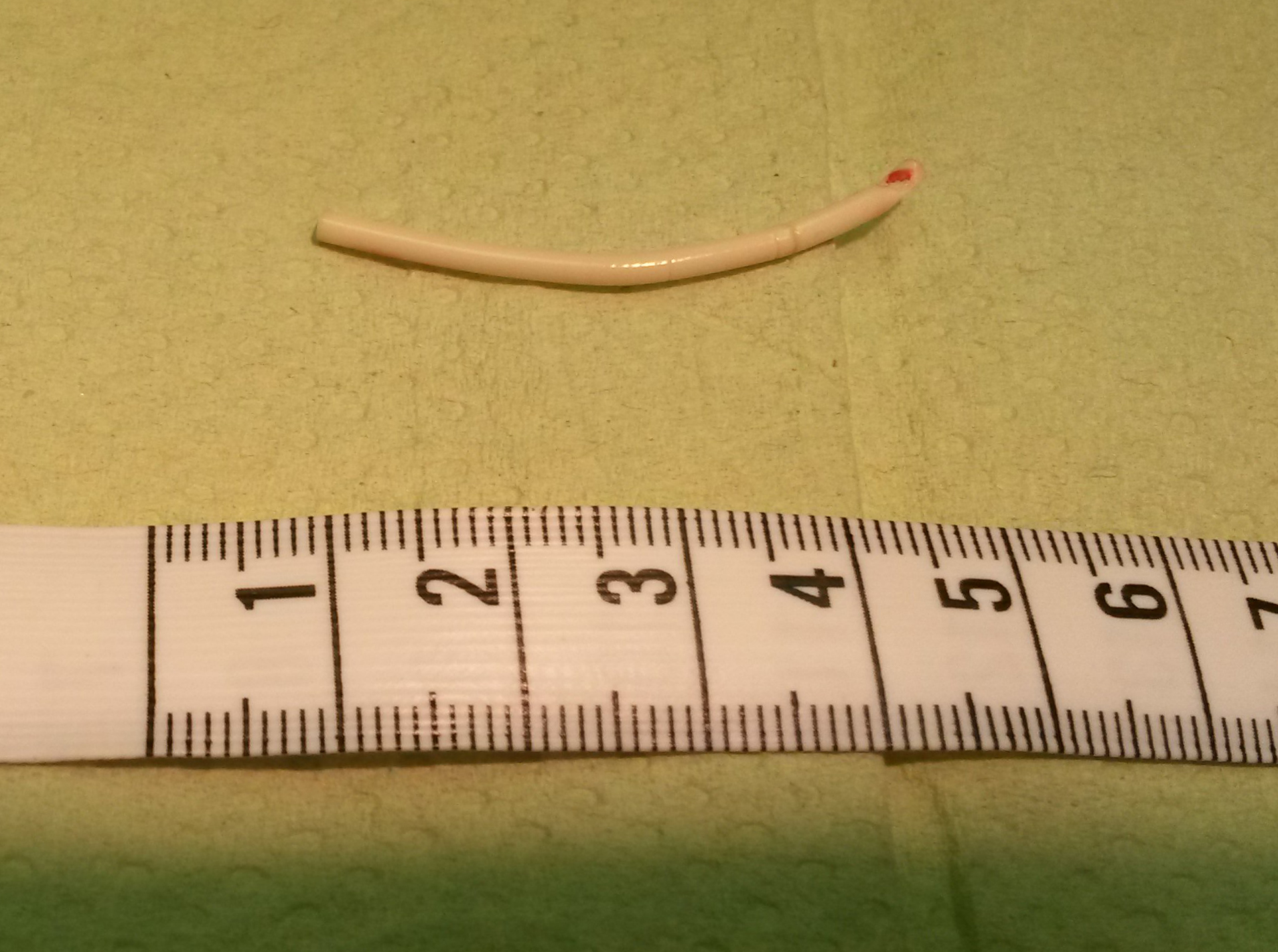
An example of Implant (Implanon)

Contraceptives are often offered immediately after childbirth. This is to prevent unintended pregnancy and reduce the risk of abortion and short-interval pregnancy, which may increase the risk of preterm delivery and neonatal complications.

Of the many reversible contraceptive measures, the Long-Acting Reversible Contraception (LARC) is the most effective with greater compliance by the patients. It can be easily placed by a physician in a short period of time, and no additional maintenance measures are required.

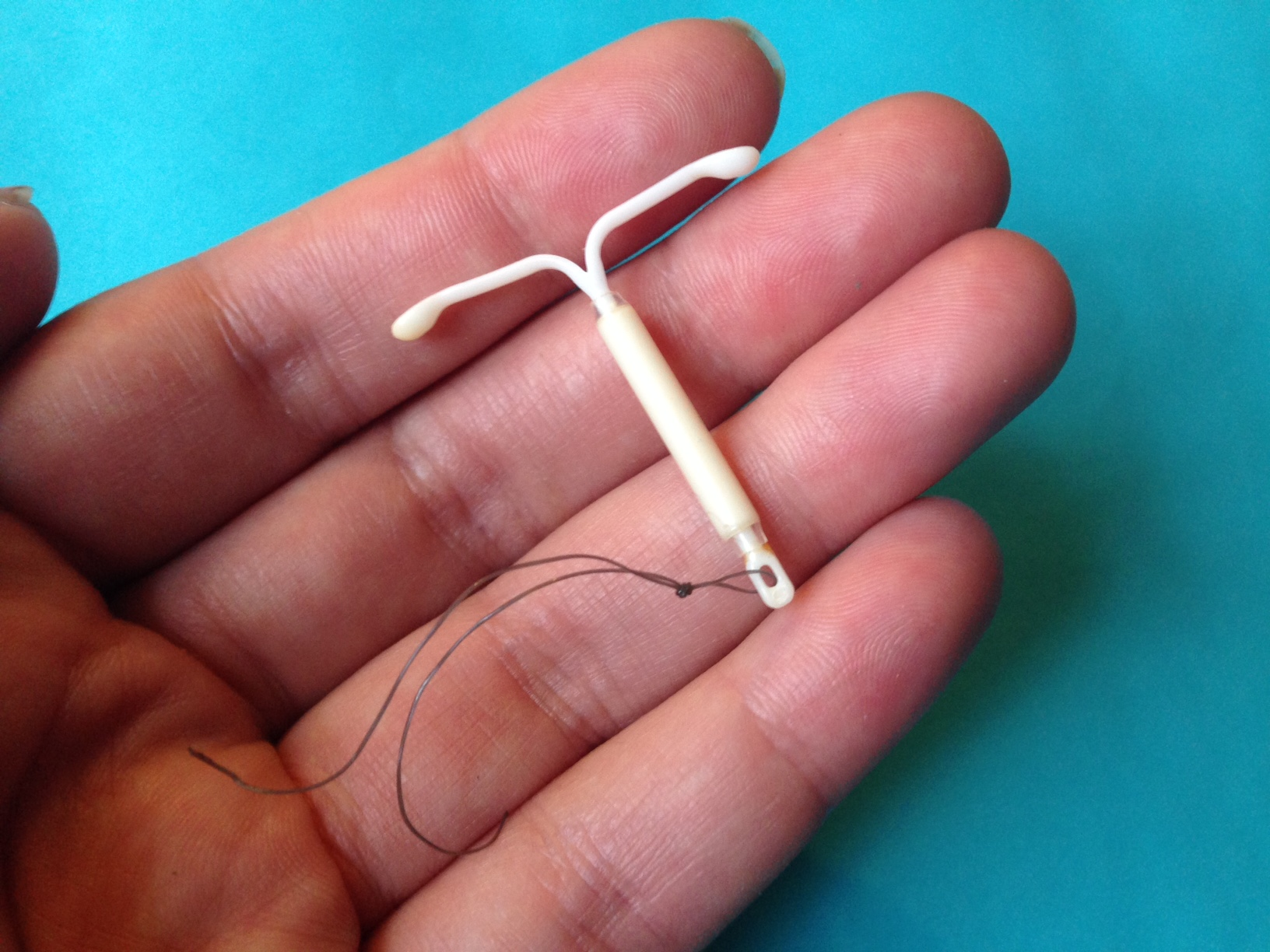
An example of IUD (Mirena)

LARC can be broken down into two different categories: Implant and Intrauterine device (IUD). Implant is a small rod containing the progestin hormone. It is placed in the upper arm and can be effective for 3 or more years. No significant risks are associated with the use of implants during postpartum period, except for its theoretical effect on breastfeeding. The progesterone released from the implants are hypothesized to reduce the breast milk production, but such effect of exogenous progesterone during the postpartum period is yet to be proven. IUD is a device that is placed within the uterus. IUD placement during postpartum period does not carry any significant risks if the patient does not have infection or hemorrhage at the time of delivery. The two common forms of IUDs are copper IUD and Levonorgestrel (LNG) IUD. LNG IUD works by releasing progestin hormone, while the copper IUD does not involve hormone in its effect. As LNG IUD involves progesterone hormone, it carries the theoretical risk of reducing breastfeeding, like the implants.

Combined hormonal contraceptives, including the birth control pills, increase the risk of blood clotting in postpartum patients. Moreover, it can also interfere with breastmilk production. Thus, the patients are advised to avoid combined hormonal contraceptives for the first 3 weeks after childbirth if not breastfeeding and for 4 to 6 weeks if breastfeeding.

Another possible contraceptive measure after childbirth is depot-medroxyprogesterone acetate (DMPA), which is also commonly known as Depo Provera. It is a progestin injection that inhibits ovulation and thickens cervical mucus. The shot is safe to be administered immediately after childbirth. However, the shot must be re-administered every 12 weeks. Also, a backup contraception is recommended in the first 7 days of its use if the patient has started using it after 21 days from the childbirth or if the patient resumed menstrual cycle.

== After abortion ==
Sex after abortion is generally safe according to the National Health Service.

== See also ==
- Sexual activity during pregnancy
- Postpartum pelvic floor dysfunction
