= Fur massage =

Form of massage

Fur massage is a form of touch that is used in partner massage. It involves using a fur glove to touch one's partner in an attempt to arouse. In therapeutic usage, professional boundaries do not permit that the therapist (giver) be emotionally involved in a massage. Fur massage mitts are sometimes recommended by professionals as a sensual toy rather than sexual toy. Use of fur gloves for massage is considered a safe sex practice by the Institute for Advanced Study of Human Sexuality.

Couples employ fur massage to focus their attention on the importance of touch and to sensitize specific areas of the skin. Couples use fur massage to stimulate the lymphatic system by exciting the skin. While traditional massage requires strong tissue rubs and technical expertise, fur massage stirs the imagination and highlights the erotic nature of touch. Special mitts are available.

== See also ==
- Massage
- Dog massage
- Cat massage
- Human sexuality
- Tantra
- Erotic massage
- Fur fetishism
