= R v Stevens =

- Supreme Court of Canada

Hearing: February 2, 1988 Judgment: June 30, 1988
- Full case name: Glenn Brian Stevens (aka Glenn Brian Villeneuve) v Her Majesty The Queen
- Citations: [1988] 1 S.C.R. 1153
- Ruling: Appeal dismissed

Court membership
- Chief Justice: Brian Dickson; Puisne Justices: Jean Beetz, Willard Estey, William McIntyre, Antonio Lamer, Bertha Wilson, Gerald Le Dain, Gérard La Forest, Claire L'Heureux-Dubé

Reasons given
- Majority: Le Dain J., joined by Dickson C.J., Beetz, McIntyre, Le Dain and La Forest JJ.
- Dissent: Wilson J., joined by Lamer and L'Heureux-Dubé JJ.

Laws applied
- R v James, [1988] 1 S.C.R. 669

R v Stevens, [1988] 1 S.C.R. 1153, was a decision of the Supreme Court of Canada rendered on June 30, 1988, concerning the retrospective application of the Canadian Charter of Rights and Freedoms.

== Background ==
Stevens was alleged to have committed an offence a few months before April 17, 1982, when the Charter came into effect. The offence was sexual intercourse by a male person with a female person under the age of fourteen years. The Criminal Code provision defining the offence specified that the accused is guilty "whether or not he believes that she is fourteen years of age or more". Counsel for the accused argued that this part of the offence contravened section 7 of the Charter, by denying a mens rea aspect to an essential element of the offence. In essence, the argument parallels that made successfully in Re BC Motor Vehicle Act (1985).

== Decision ==
In a 5:3 decision, the Court found that the accused could not rely on the Charter, in challenging the Criminal Code provision under which he was charged, because he committed the offence prior to the Charter entering into force. The majority relied on R v James, [1988] 1 S.C.R. 669.

== Dissent ==
Writing for the minority, in dissent, Justice Bertha Wilson argued that since the Charter had entered into effect at the time of Stevens's trial, he was entitled to its benefit. She distinguished the James case, which held that a search or seizure that took place prior to the Charter coming into force could not constitute a violation of section 8 of the Charter. Wilson wrote that in considering section 7 of the Charter, one must ask whether, at the time of the projected deprivation of the accused's right to liberty, that deprivation would be in accordance with the principles of fundamental justice or not (paragraph 20). She reasoned that since the Charter was in full force and effect at the time of the accused's trial, no issue of retrospectivity was raised. She went on to find that the Criminal Code provision contravened section 7 of the Charter by creating an absolute liability offence with the possibility of imprisonment. Wilson further found that the contravention was not saved by section 1 of the Charter. On this issue, Wilson gave extensive consideration to the majority decision of the British Columbia Court of Appeal in R v Ferguson, [1987] 6 W.W.R. 481. That decision was written by Justice Beverley McLachlin, who would later join the Supreme Court of Canada as Wilson's colleague. McLachlin had found that the denial of the mistake-of-age defence in the Criminal Code provision was justified under section 1 because it created a strong deterrent against having sexual intercourse with girls, even if they appear to have attained the statutory age. Wilson disagreed with this analysis. She argued that it ascribed an unrealistically high degree of legal sophistication to the average accused (paragraph 48). She further held that a mechanism was available which would constitute a smaller impairment on the rights of the accused: a due-diligence defence.

== Aftermath ==
Two years later, in the case of R v Hess; R v Nguyen, Wilson considered the same provision, this time writing for the majority, and found it unconstitutional as a violation of section 7, not saved by section 1. Retrospectivity was not an issue in that case because the alleged offences occurred after the Charter entered into effect.
