= Child sex =

Child sex may refer to:

- Child sexuality
- Child sexual abuse
  - Child-on-child sexual abuse
