= International Fetish Day =

Day supporting the fetish and BDSM community

- Also called: National Fetish Day (Original name)
- Observed by: Fetish and BDSM community
- Type: International
- Date: Third Friday in January
- 2025 date: January 17
- 2026 date: January 16
- 2027 date: January 15
- 2028 date: January 21
- Frequency: annual

International Fetish Day is a day supporting the fetish and BDSM community. It originated in the United Kingdom as National Fetish Day and was first held on 18 January 2008. The first International Fetish Day was held on 16 January 2009 (the third Friday of the year). The main purpose of International Fetish Day is to increase awareness and support of the fetish community, whilst also opposing the UK law criminalizing possession of "extreme pornography". It is also designed to encourage members of the community to be more open about their sexuality.

== National Fetish Day ==
National Fetish Day was first celebrated in the United Kingdom on 4 September 2008. However, International Fetish Day has taken over from it.

=== Perverts Wear Purple ===
On National Fetish Day, one of the main aspects is that members of the community wear an item of purple clothing as a sign that they are a member, in an event known which was initially known as "Perverts Wear Purple". The main benefit of this act is that it indicates that someone is a member of the community whilst being "Vanilla" at the same time. Purple is a colour widely used in BDSM circles. The main website says that, "By joining this fun 'National Fetish Day – Perverts Wear Purple' event, you as an individual will be joined by fellow community people all over the country in saying 'It's ok to enjoy what I enjoy' without damaging your 'vanilla' identity or integrity." There has been contention around the slogan 'Perverts Wear Purple' primarily to do with the fact that many in the BDSM community distance themselves from the 'pervert' label. Others in the community feel that using the word 'Pervert' is a useful reclaiming.. Another two slogans which don't contain the word "perverts" are "Enjoy and be proud" and "It's OK to be you".

=== MP Ronnie Campbell ===
The Labour Member of Parliament for Blyth Valley, Ronnie Campbell, accidentally gave his support to National Fetish Day, because he misunderstood the word "Fetish" and was not aware of the "Perverts Wear Purple" slogan. A local newspaper, the Sunday Sun interviewed Campbell about his supposed support for the event by wearing purple. Campbell said, "I thought a fetish was a worry, like worrying about backing the right horse."

One of the people who publicised National Fetish Day, known as "Pierced Knight", claimed that,

I received an email from Carol Delaney, the secretary to Ronnie Campbell, Labour MP for Blyth Valley. She confirmed that Mr Campbell will be supporting this national day of awareness on 21st January. Using the tag line of 'Perverts Wear Purple' those that support this day will be wearing about their person something that is purple, like a shirt, a tie, a skirt, a hair band.

Campbell wrote a letter of complaint to the Sunday Sun, claiming that they had been making him look stupid by "twisting and turning" the meaning of what he had been saying. He wrote that, "I would never have agreed to support anything that had the title 'Perverts wear Purple' and I do not imagine any other Member of Parliament would either."

The Sunday Sun published a response saying,

If you hadn't misunderstood the word 'fetish' and backed National Fetish Day in the first place, we wouldn't have had a story. We did not twist anything and contacted you four times to clarify certain points. In fact, you were still backing National Fetish Day — saying you would wear your purple tie or shirt — until our final call when we pointed out the event slogan was 'perverts wear purple'. Imagine the story we could have written if we hadn't done this? This paper respects you as a Labour MP with an independent voice. However, this doesn't stop us writing stories when you drop yourself in it.

The first International Fetish Day was held on 16 January 2009. In the United Kingdom, the day attracted some media coverage because of the forthcoming ban on extreme pornography, coming into force on 26 January 2009. Symon Hill wrote in The Guardian that:

People with certain fetishes now face the prospect of becoming victims of the government's sustained assault on civil liberties. In a knee-jerk piece of headline-grabbing, ministers have introduced a law on "extreme pornography" which comes into force this month. Rather than targeting the exploitative, abusive and bullying elements of the pornography industry, the law is aimed at sadomasochistic images regardless of the context. So low is the barrier that if taken literally it could lead to a couple who take a photo of their consensual (and legal) sexual activity being arrested for possession of that photo.

== See also ==
- Spirit Day
