= Love & Respect =

2004 book

- Author: Emerson Eggerichs
- Language: English
- Subject: Self-help, marriage, love, respect
- Publisher: Integrity Publishers
- Publication date: 2004
- Publication place: United States
- ISBN: 978-1-59145-187-7

Love & Respect: The Love She Most Desires; The Respect He Desperately Needs was written in 2004 by Emerson Eggerichs and first published by Integrity Publishers, Nashville, TN. The book was a national bestseller. In his book, Eggerichs argues that men value respect more highly than love.

In 1999 Eggerichs and his wife Sarah founded "Love & Respect Ministries. Their ministry resulted in the best-selling self-help book The Love She Most Desires; The Respect He Desperately Needs.

Eggerichs had been pastor of the Michigan's East Lansing Trinity Church for 19 years when he Love & Respect was published in 2004.

Eggerichs earned his master's in divinity from Dubuque Seminary, and earned the PhD in child and family ecology from Michigan State University.

Eggerichs continues to speak at marriage conferences. The ideas of the Love & Respect ministry have been taught at workshops and conferences held by other pastors. Conferences are also conducted via video. Since the 2020 publication of an open letter to Focus on the Family by the popular marriage author Sheila Wray Gregoire, the book has been the source of controversy within evangelical Christian circles.

== Summary ==
The book is built upon the theory that the "primary emotional needs" for men and women, respectively are that men need respect and women need love, like they need air to breathe.

Eggerichs argues that careless remarks and minor misunderstandings that leave a wife feeling unloved or a husband feeling that his wife doesn't respect him can snowball into major conflict unless couples work to stop destructive cycles.

Citing the Quran ( (Qur'an, 30:21) ) in its discussion of Eggerich's book, the Colombo, Daily News argues that women, to whom love for their husbands comes naturally, but who must learn to have "unconditional respect" for their husbands because both the Quran and "contemporary research" have proven that "The more respect a woman shows her husband, the more love and kindness he will show her."

According to British clinical psychologist Stephen Briers, Eggerichs commits the widespread psychological error of the self-help genre by writing as though "a relationship is some kind of romantic cooperative forged primarily to meet the emotional needs of the two people in it."

According to Christian author Glenn I. Miller, Eggerichs argues that it is important for a spouse to display love and respect even if the other spouse does not reciprocate, because one's relationship with a spouse is intended to model and reflect a Christian's relationship with Christ.

In Love & Respect Eggerichs argues that "1. Love is her deepest need and respect is his deepest need. I believe this based on the Bible. Ephesians 5:33: 'Nevertheless let each individual among you also love his own wife even as himself; and let the wife see to it that she respect her husband.' In other words, a wife needs to feel love and a husband needs to feel respect. Consequently ... 2. Without love she reacts without respect, and without respect he reacts without love. There is a love and respect connection."

Emerson Eggerichs claims to have scientific support for his theory of "Love & Respect" in the form of a study by psychologist John Gottman of the University of Washington, "I heard of a study he did using 2,000 couples on why marriages failed. And he found love and respect were the two major factors."

Although the L & R conferences promote "the assumption that the woman's place is in the home," and Sarah Eggerichs advises women to praise "their husband's commitment to bring home the bacon," she has had a career as a well-coifed, highly polished, full-time professional speaker. Sarah Eggerichs advises women to do things their husbands enjoy, even though "You may be bored, sitting in the back of a fishing boat or watching him do woodworking, but he will love it"; to welcome his sexual advances, "As a wise woman once asked, 'Why would you deprive him of something that takes such a short time and makes him soooo happy?'"; and to make certain always to be nicely-groomed and dressed when their husbands come home from work.

== Translations ==
(This list is most probably incomplete.)

Language	Title	Year of Translation
Turkish	Sevgi ve Saygı: Kadının İstediği Sevgi, Adamın Beklediği Saygı	2018
Spanish	Amor y Respeto	2010
German	Liebe und Respekt	2011
Afrikaans	Liefde en respek	
Italian	Amore e rispetto	
Polish	Milosc i szacunek	
Romanian	Dragoste şi respect	
Russian	Любовь и уважение	2013
Slovak	Láska a úcta	2016
Bangla	লাভ এন্ড রেসপেক্ট : দাম্পত্য সুখের অজানা রহস্য	2020

== Reception ==
Since at least 2016, "Love and Respect" has been accused of teaching messages that are dangerous, such as ignoring consent in sexual relationships. The publication of Sheila Wray Gregoire's 2020 open letter to Focus on the Family (which endorses the book "Love and Respect" and platforms its authors and teachings) opened up a broader conversation about the effects of the teachings of the book. In this letter, Gregoire states that the book is problematic in many ways, among which are its framing of sex as a male entitlement, and the way its messages protect and enable abusers. Gregoire has gone on to research and publicize the damage caused to women and marriages by messages such as those in "Love and Respect," publishing the book "The Great Sex Rescue," which widely references quotes and ideas found in "Love and Respect." Psychology Today also published an article outlining the lack of scientific plausibility to the central claims of the book about men's need for respect versus women's desire for love, stating instead that research shows that both love and respect are needed for both parties in a healthy relationship. The book has been allegedly promoted within the BDSM community as a tool for coercing an unwilling wife into participating in BDSM acts.
