= Kizzy: Mum at 14 =

British documentary

Kizzy: Mum at 14 was a BBC Three documentary about an underage mother, Kizzy Kay Neal. It was first shown on 11 December 2007 as part of the fourth and final part of the Born Survivor series on BBC Three. Kizzy had sex for the first time at the age of 13, and gave birth, at the age of 14 to a boy, whom she named Kaylib.

== Show and background ==
The 'fly-on-the-wall' documentary highlights the UK's high teenage pregnancy rate and follows Kizzy after she leaves school for the summer holidays in 2007. Kizzy was born in Leicester in 1992, but lives in Torbay. Kizzy claims she got pregnant in a one night stand with a boy named Louie, whom Kizzy wants to accept responsibility for Kaylib. Louie has moved to Essex since Kizzy became pregnant. Kizzy arranged to have herself and Kaylib baptised at Easter time, her reason being to give Kaylib a good start in life.

=== Reaction of friends ===
Kizzy tells the interviewers about mixed reactions from her friends. She says that when her friends found out she was pregnant they wanted babies too and, three weeks later, they were pregnant. Not all the reactions were positive. Her brothers talk about having abuse shouted at them and even being physically beaten on several occasions.

=== Meeting with Louie ===
At the end of documentary Kizzy, her mother, brothers and her boyfriend Michael travel up to Essex to see Louie. Louie would not allow Michael or her brothers at the meeting and would also not allow cameras. Kizzy stated that this was the first time Louie had met his son and it would probably be the last.

=== Kizzy's future ===
In September 2007, Kizzy was set to go back to school, but the school said that it would be better in all interests if she went to college. Kizzy aims to join the UK Youth Parliament, with her political focus being on youth and sex education. In August 2011 Kizzy gave birth to her second child, a boy named Taylor.
