= Zestra =

Arousal gel for women

Zestra is an arousal gel for women that claims to increase sexual pleasure. It contains borage seed oil, evening primrose oil, angelica root extract, Coleus forskohlii extract, ascorbyl palmitate, and dl-alpha tocopherol. The gel is intended to be applied topically to the outside of the female genitalia. After about five minutes, the woman experiences a "pleasant, tingly and/or warming sensation" that lasts for up to 45 minutes. Innovus Pharma, maker of the product, calls this feeling the "Zestra Rush".

While claims of aphrodisiac properties are common to many substances, the effectiveness of Zestra is supported by two clinical trials. However, both studies included subjects with various sexual disorders, making the product's efficiency on healthy women less well established.
