= Gay Kids =

2008 Norwegian non-fiction book

Gay Kids – Kule barn som også finnes
- Author: Lill-Ann Chepstow-Lusty, Bera Ullstein Moseng and Rolf Martin Angeltvedt
- Language: Norwegian Bokmål
- Subject: Childhood of gay people
- Publisher: Abstrakt forlag
- Publication date: November 6, 2008
- Publication place: Norway
- Media type: Print
- ISBN: 978-82-7935-262-4

Gay Kids – Kule barn som også finnes (2008) ("Gay Kids – Cool children who also exist") is a non-fiction Norwegian book that attempts to educate children about gay and lesbian identities.

Gay Kids was released on November 6, 2008, and an exhibition of the book's photographic material was on display outside the Museum of Cultural History in Oslo. Originally scheduled through January 2009, the exhibit remained through July, an extra six months. The exhibition was inaugurated by gay politician and former Finance Minister of Norway Per Kristian Foss who also has provided a photo of himself as a 9-year-old boy for the book. Other celebrities such as pioneering Norwegian gay activist Kim Friele, chairman of Oslo's city government, Erling Lae and chief editor of Dagbladet, Anne Aasheim have also contributed with photographs for the book, altogether more than 100 lesbian, bisexual and gay people have contributed with their childhood photos.

The book, in part based on the research done at the Norwegian Social Research institute, was originally intended to be an art project to describe the childhoods of gay men and women before their homosexual identities were in place, and it has been partially funded by grants from the Ministry of Children and Equality and the Fritt Ord foundation, and it is also sponsored by Gay & Lesbian Health Norway along with several other organizations. Coauthor Angeltvedt stated at the book's release that he would like to see it become a textbook in Norway's elementary schools. In a November 6, 2008, interview with Minister of Education Bård Vegard Solhjell it reads that the book will be made available in elementary schools and that "the book will be adapted to the teaching plan goals which address sexual orientation and diversity of family forms up and through the 7th grade."

Gay love still remains as one of the secrets of childhood. And keeping secrets in the love life isn't always so good. Because what we do in secrecy can be turned into something scary, shameful and a little bit dangerous. Children and adolescents must learn to speak openly about gay love. This goes for everyone of us – but particularly for youths and adults who fall in love with someone of the same sex.

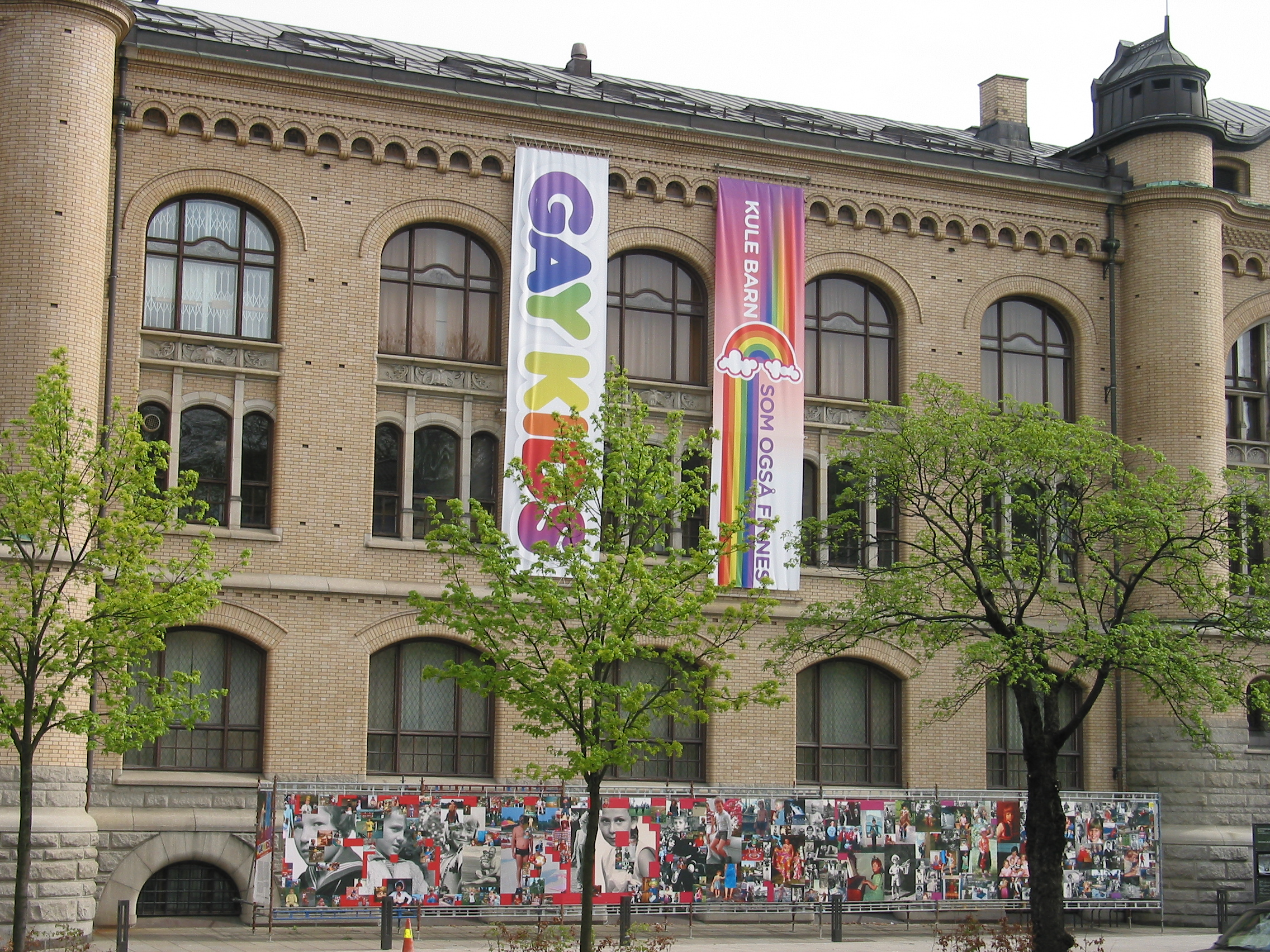
The display outside the Museum of Cultural History, Oslo, May 2009.
