= Outline of sexual ethics =

Overview of and topical guide to sexual ethics

The following outline is provided as an overview of and topical guide to sexual ethics:

Sexual ethics – branch of philosophy that explores the moral obligations, and permissibility, or impermissibility of sexual activities. Also deals with issues arising from all aspects of sexuality and human sexual behaviour relating to the community and personal standards regarding the conduct of interpersonal relationships, including issues of consent, sexual relations before marriage and/or while married, including the issues of marital fidelity and premarital and non-marital sex, sexual orientation, and more.

== What type of thing is sexual ethics? ==
Sexual ethics can be described as all of the following:

- A branch of philosophy –
  - A branch of ethics –
  - A branch of philosophy of sex – part of applied philosophy studying sex and love. It includes both ethics of phenomena such as prostitution, rape, sexual harassment, sexual identity, the age of consent, and homosexuality, and conceptual analysis of concepts such as "what is sex"?

== History of sexual ethics ==
- History of human sexuality
- Sexual Revolution

== Ethical issues involving sex ==
- Contraception; varieties of, technologies in
  - Contraceptive security
- Unintended pregnancy
- Abortion
- Safe sex
- Sexually transmitted infections (STIs)
- Reproductive rights
- Genital modification and mutilation
  - Circumcision
  - Female genital mutilation (FGM)
- Adoption
- Family
  - Incest
- Sexual harassment
- Sexual abuse—definitions of, statistics about, strategies for preventing, legal and moral questions about
  - Rape and consent

=== Issues pertaining to age groups ===
- Child sexuality
  - Child marriage
- Child pornography
- Child prostitution
- Adolescent sexuality: and all the other topics included on this list
  - Adolescent sexuality in the United States
  - Teenage pregnancy
- Sexuality in older age

=== Issues pertaining to love and sex ===
- Unrequited love
- Polyamory

=== Issues pertaining to religion and sex ===
- Religion and Sexuality
  - Catholicism and sexuality
- Chastity
- Homosexuality and religion
- Tantrism
- Religious views on birth control
  - Christian views on contraception

== Sexual ethics concepts ==
=== Dating and marriage ===
- Marriage—how the love described above is or is not related to the permissibility or forbiddenness of sex; what kind of commitment it is that is central to marriage.
  - Polygamy
    - Polygyny
    - Polyandry
  - Extramarital sex
    - Adultery
  - Divorce
- Infidelity

=== Homosexuality ===
Homosexuality

- Gays and Gay sex
- Lesbians and Lesbian sex
- Bisexuals
- Transgender individuals and Transsexualism

=== Paraphilias ===
- Paraphilias
  - List of paraphilias
  - Fetishism
  - Coprophilia
  - Exhibitionism
  - Necrophilia
  - Pedophilia - sexual attraction to children.
  - Zoophilia - sexual attraction to animals.

=== Sex acts ===
- Various sex methods
  - BDSM
  - Sexual positions
  - Swinging
  - Various combinations of people having sex
    - Threesome
    - Orgy
    - Group sex
    - Gang Bang
  - Types of sex and sex-like acts
    - Oral sex
    - Anal sex
    - Double penetration
    - Coitus
    - Kiss
    - Masturbation—frequency of; techniques of

== Sexual ethics publications ==
=== Books on sexual ethics ===
- Primoratz, Igor. Ethics and Sex. New York: Routledge, 1999.

== See also ==
- Virginity
- Casual sex or "Hooking up"; one night stand
- Frequency of sex and cooperation between sexual partners
- Libido/sex drive, sexual desire, lust
- Sexism
- Feminism and sex: has influenced many aspects of (particularly western) cultural views about sex
- Gender roles
- Animal sexual behaviour, including masturbation and the majority of other topics on this list: the implications for the obligatoriness, permissibility, or forbiddenness of such behaviors in humans
- Sodomy
- Indecent exposure
- Pornography
