= Canine massage =

Massage therapy for dogs

Canine massage is a branch of massage therapy that promotes health in dogs. Specifically, canine massage therapy is a form of alternative therapy, the benefits of which may include relaxation, increased oxygenation, relief from pain, improved joint flexibility, and miscellaneous benefits to the immune system. It uses touch to maintain or improve both physical and emotional well-being. However, an owner should consult with a veterinarian before attempting to massage their dog themselves.

== History ==
The history of canine massage dates back to ancient times. In India during the development of varmalogy, not only human but animal bodies were charted, resulting in what we refer to as trigger points. Julius Caesar travelled with a personal massotherapist. This masseuse also worked on Caesar's war dogs. The first known documentation of massage was in 2700 BC in China. Massage techniques continued to develop throughout history and are mentioned in the early writings of the Greeks, Romans, Egyptians, Turks, Persians, and Japanese. Early Egyptian hieroglyphics even depicted “animal healers” using massage techniques, and horse massage was practiced in ancient China and Rome.

The most common form of massage used in the west is known as Swedish massage which was first developed by Per Henrik Ling. The practice of Swedish massage was first brought to the U.S. by Dr. Weir Mitchell in 1877. However, it was not until World War I and World War II that the benefits were truly recognized in that country. With the formation of the American Massage Therapy Association, state-by-state efforts were made to pass laws that licensed and, thereby, legitimized massage as a medical treatment.

In terms of animal massage, although people had been performing some form of massage on animals throughout history, modern massage was used primarily for horses until the late 20th century. As long as horse racing has existed, equine massage has been an integral part of caring for the valuable animals. In the 1970s the U.S. Equestrian Team formalized their use of massage, no longer referring to it as a "rub down" but calling it therapy. Jack Meagher, who coined the term "sports massage" began working with racing and show horses, including the U.S. Three Day Event Team and the Olympic Team. Canine massage grew in popularity shortly after as the public began to recognize the benefits of equine massage.

== Benefits ==
Canine massage can be offered for relaxation, rehabilitation, or competition – “sports massage” – purposes. The benefit of massage to dogs is equivalent to the benefit experienced by humans.

Canine massage therapy should not be used as a substitute for veterinary medical care. However, when used in combination with medical care, it can help enhance the recovery process in many medical cases. In particular, canine massage used for rehabilitation purposes can include the following benefits:

- Help to relieve age related problems
- Reverse muscle atrophy from inactivity or disuse
- Provide relief from muscle tension, soreness, spasms, and weaknesses
- Provide relief from chronic pain and discomfort from arthritis, hip dysplasia, etc. through the release of endorphins
- Treatment of myofascial pain

In addition, canine massage can provide emotional well-being for the animal. Massage therapists often work with animals to calm hyperactivity, anxiousness, and nervousness.

== Techniques ==
Several strokes and techniques used in human massage are practiced in canine massage for similar reasons. These techniques include Swedish Massage, Myofascial Release, Positional Release, Reflexology, Watsu, Trigger Point Therapy, Orthobionomy, various Osteopathic techniques or Acupressure, to name a few.

Many of the multitude of massage techniques share some of the same basic strokes but the application of these strokes may vary slightly depending on the intent of the stroke and the practitioners skill level.

== Therapist Charting Techniques ==
Although there are many different ways in which a canine massage therapist will conduct a session, all will use some method to assess the needs of the dog and develop an improvement plan for the animal. One of the most common methods is referred to as SOAP – Subjective, Objective, Assessment, and Plan.

The therapist first records any Subjective information that is given to them by the dog's owner. They will then record any Objective information that they observed about the dog during the treatment session. Objective information could include gait and postural analysis and levels of muscle tension. The third item that the canine massage therapist needs to consider is the Assessment information. The therapist will consider what massage techniques worked best for the dog and will often note any changes in gait or posture after the treatment session is complete. Finally, after the therapist has carefully considered all of the information, they will suggest a Plan to the owner to help the dog. Recommendations can include veterinary visits and owner homework, as well as follow-up massage sessions.

== Legal status ==
Laws relating to animal massage vary widely by municipality, state and country. In the U.S., for example, state laws vary widely. The IAAMB provides a reasonably up-to-date chart of state veterinary scope of practice laws as they pertain to animal massage. Some states have no restrictions, and some require that only veterinarians can perform canine massage. As another example, in the UK, all canine massage therapists can only practice under direct supervision of a veterinarian while in the Netherlands, animal massage is part of the curriculum for animal physiotherapists (dierenfysiotherapie). There are, however, organizations that exist to try to self regulate the industry and provide information to practitioners and clients.

The International Association of Animal Massage & Bodywork (IAAMB) is a professional organization that provides support for animal massage therapists. In addition to being a prominent voice in the animal massage community, IAAMB supports national competency assurance testing and accreditation. The International Association of Animal Massage Therapists is another group. Both of these organizations share physical addresses with specific schools. There is, as of this writing, no truly independent trade association for animal massage therapists.

The Nation Board of Certification for Animal Accupressure and Massage is an independent organization which offers a standardized test that Certifies those who can pass the test. This test is offered in the United States via the Consortium of College Testing Centers.
