= Sexual meanings =

Sexual meanings are the meanings that are attributed, by a particular cultural-social-historical context, to sexual acts and broadly to all the aspects of the erotic dimension of squares human sexual experience. This also includes the beliefs on what is considered sexual and what is not. Sexual meanings are social and cultural constructs, and they are metabolized and subjectivized by the individual only after cultural and social mediation.

In the first systematic study on this issue, Michel Foucault, with his 1976 History of Sexuality, was the first to study this issue with a systematic approach. He argued that the concept of what activities and sensations are "sexual" is historically determined, and it is therefore part of a changing "discourse".

Being the main force conditioning human relationship, sex is essentially political. In any social context, the construction of a "sexual universe" is fundamentally linked to the structures of power. The construction of sexual meanings, is an instrument by which social institutions (religion, marketing, the educational system, psychiatry, etc.) control and shape human relationships.

According to Foucault, sexuality began to be regarded as a concept part of human nature since the 19th century; so sexuality began to be used as a mean to define normality and its boundaries, and to conceive everything outside those boundaries in the realm of psychopathology. In the 20th century, with the theories of Freud and of sexology, the "not-normal" was seen more as a "discontent of civilization".
