= Porn Sunday =

Anti-pornography event

Porn Sunday was an event organized by several hundred churches in the United States and around the world to feature the issues of pornography and sexual addiction. It was scheduled for February 6, 2011, in order to coincide with Super Bowl XLV.

== Description ==
The event was conceived by Craig Gross, leader of XXXchurch.com, a Christian group that both advocates against pornography, ministering both to professionals and consumers. In the mid and late 2000s Gross and xxxchurch co-founder Mike Foster featured Porn Sunday events as guest minister in several well-known churches in the United States, calling the consumption of pornography among Christians the "elephant in the pews".

The 2011 event drew the participation of a number of National Football League officials and players, who produced a video for distribution at prayer services before that year's Super Bowl championship event.
