= A Mind of Its Own: A Cultural History of the Penis =

2001 book by David M. Friedman

- Author: David M. Friedman
- Language: English
- Subject: Human sexuality
- Publisher: Simon & Schuster
- Publication date: 2001
- Publication place: United States
- Pages: 358
- ISBN: 978-0-684-85320-8

A Mind of Its Own: A Cultural History of the Penis is a non-fiction book by New York-based columnist and author David M. Friedman that details the history of the human penis.

== Format ==
The book is set up in different time periods, beginning with Mesopotamia and ending with modern Western beliefs about the male sex organ, ranging from being considered divine to being hidden. Two of the major focuses of the book are Sigmund Freud's sexual theories and the erection industry, such as Viagra. In the descriptions of how different religions have treated human penises, Friedman says that Christians started the trend of not liking the portrayal of the male sex organ. There is a chapter about pseudoscientists who try to link penis size to race, while the last chapter of the book focuses on the erection industry.

== Reception ==
In The BMJ, Birte Twisselmann wrote that the book is "educational and entertaining by virtue of an amazing amount of information gathered from a wide range of mythical and medical, cultural and scientific, historical and humorous sources. It is the casually presented details and conclusions that provide food for thought." A book review in the Journal of the History of Sexuality by Jeffrey M. Dickeman described it as "high journalism, neither acceptably historical nor cultural." Wisam Mansour of the Journal of Men, Masculinities and Spirituality said that it is written "in a scholarly manner coupled with a sense of humor."

Ian Sansom of The Guardian described the book as a work of philosophy in its own way. Writing for the New Statesman, Marcelle D'Argy Smith commented that "Friedman's book reads like a Hollywood epic" as a mix of "sex, death, torture, self-destruction, heroes, villains, love, drugs, money and high-tech machinery." A Seattle Times review said the book is "embarrassingly europhallocentric."
