= Boston Medical Group =

- Type: Private
- Industry: Male impotence, Men's Sexual Health, Healthcare
- Founded: 1997
- Headquarters: La Mesa, California
- Number of employees: 150 (2008)

Boston Medical Group (doing business as Boston Medical) is a network of medical offices sharing research information and treatment methods for erectile dysfunction and premature ejaculation.

The company opened its first office in Mexico in Guadalajara, Jalisco on 4 July 1997. In 2006, due to differences in visions, the shareholders of Boston Medical Group decided to part ways. This decision resulted in the creation of two entirely separate entities, each with its own management, operations, marketing, advertising, and medical protocols, while both operating under the "Boston Medical Group" brand name.

As of 2023, The U.S. operations of Boston Medical Group primarily offer telemedicine services. In contrast, the international division operates in several countries, maintaining over 100 offices in locations such as Mexico, Argentina, Brazil, Colombia, Peru and Spain.

In December 2025, the company underwent a branding change and adopted the name Boston Medical, continuing its operations under the same corporate structure previously known as Boston Medical Group.

== Treatment for Erectile Dysfunction, Premature Ejaculation & Hormone Therapy ==
The office's primary treatment, called intracavernous pharmacotherapy (ICP), consists of administering an injection of a vasodilator drug by inserting a hypodermic needle directly into the penis, which increases blood flow, and causes an erection in minutes in many patients.

ICP treatment has been used to help create and maintain erections in patients who do not respond to more mainstream medications or are prohibited from taking these drugs because of a heart condition, diabetes or blood pressure since ICP treatments are localized and do not typically interact with other systemic medications.

Intracavernous pharmacotherapy can be used in patients with a wide variety of ailments wherein other medications might not be as effective. For example, a study showed that over seventy percent of patients with a spinal cord injury responded positively to intracavernous pharmacotherapy and were able to achieve an erection.

In addition to ICP, the company also offers treatments in hormone replacement therapy (HRT), specifically for low testosterone (Low T), a sublingual form of the well-known drug Viagra which is dissolved under the tongue and quickly enters the blood stream and a variety of treatment programs designed to specifically address low libido, ED, and premature ejaculation.

== Notable Physicians ==
Many of the physicians employed by Boston Medical Group themselves have won individual awards, including the Marie and Oscar Randolph award, the KCMS Robert H. Hume award for excellence in surgical research and the Physician's Recognition Award for Continuing Medical Education by the American Medical Association, among others. These awards were not won during their employment at Boston Medical Group.

== Advertising ==
Boston Medical Group has conducted marketing campaigns across various media, including billboards, print advertising, radio, and television. Past campaigns included radio advertisements aired between 2007 and 2009, as well as later radio advertising featuring professional voice actors.

== Coverage in Media ==
On April 7, 2011, the Los Angeles Times published an exposé about Boston Medical Group's sales and compensation practices. The article was titled "Clinic settles lawsuits but still faces scrutiny over erectile dysfunction injections" and subtitled "Boston Medical Group doctors get bonuses to promote the drug injections. Some patients say they suffered from priapism and permanent damage because they were not informed of the risks."

== Legal Cases ==
After admitting to not keeping proper records in 2001 and 2002, one doctor at an office location in Manhattan was placed on probation for five years by the New York state Health Department, and was no longer allowed to treat patients with erectile dysfunction, premature ejaculation and other sexual problems.

In the case of John Henry Howard v. Boston Medical Group, a 2009 trial court decision was overturned on appeal. On July 12, 2011, the Georgia Court of Appeals ruled in favor of Boston Medical Group, citing findings that the patient had not followed provided medical instructions and that the company had acted within appropriate standards of patient care.

Boston Men's Health Center Inc. which responsible for advertising and marketing of Boston Medical Group was incorrectly named in this lawsuit in the State of Georgia as is also pointed out by the Georgia Court of Appeals. Boston Men's Health Center operates as a management company for the network of individual clinics and collects a management fee from their client, Boston Medical Group, for their management services.
