= The ABC of Sex Education for Trainables =

1975 film

- Directed by: Max Brecher
- Written by: Medora Bass; Thomas Blair; Gail Hanson; Winifred Kempton
- Produced by: Max Brecher
- Narrated by: Richard Dix
- Cinematography: Thomas Blair
- Edited by: Thomas Blair
- Music by: The Lakesprings
- Production company: Hallmark Films, Inc.
- Distributed by: Hallmark Films and Recordings, Inc (1975 16mm film); Fantoma (2001 DVD release)
- Release date: 1975
- Running time: 20 minutes
- Country: United States
- Language: English

The ABC of Sex Education for Trainables is a 1975 short educational film hosted by Richard Dix. It was intended to inform people about the need to educate the mentally disabled ("trainables" as they are referred to in the film) about sex and sexuality. Reflecting the views held at the time, the film explains that "trainables" cannot learn in the same manner as those of normal intelligence, but must instead be trained through repetition.

== Background ==
The 20 minute video places a high priority on teaching the intellectually disabled about sex so that they will not make inappropriate sexual comments, expose parts of their bodies, masturbate in public, be involved in unplanned pregnancies, or become victims of rape or molestation. It also notes that the goal of teachers should be to explain sexuality in a factual manner, and that views of sexual morality vary between families and should therefore be left for parents to teach.

The movie is used in "Timmy and the Sex Lesson", an episode of The Residents' video series Timmy.

== Cast ==
The onscreen credits acknowledge that narration was provided by Richard Dix and that dramatic sequences were provided by William Block, M.D., Beverly Camp, Rick Fullerton, Peter Green, Michael Kowalski, Ellen Moats, George Murray, Aaron Orenstein, Christopher Reidy, Murray Zeligman, and members and staff of the Ronald Bruce Nippon Assoc., and Planned Parenthood of Southeastern Pennsylvania.

== Scenes from the movie ==
- The opening sequence is of a girl (presumably a mentally disabled person) walking down the street. She is approached by a man in a car who leans out of his window and plays with her hair. She then gets in the back seat of his car and rides away.
- A group of teachers are in a workshop together. The instructor encourages the teachers to yell out different slang terms for the penis while she writes them on a chalkboard. This is intended to make the teachers more comfortable with the words so that they will not be embarrassed to teach mentally disabled children about sex.
- A man sits with a mentally disabled young man and explains to him about how penises become erect using several drawings.
- A man comes into a boy's bedroom, asking him why he has not yet left his bed. The boy replies: "I'm all wet and sticky!". The man proceeds to explain to the boy what a wet dream is and says he will help him clean up.
- A woman comes into her son's bedroom unannounced and discovers him masturbating. She then explains to him that it is good that he is doing it in private, that it feels good, and that someday she and he will have to talk about it and then leaves the room.

== Reception ==
In 2001, DVD Talk reviewed the Fantoma Films "Educational Archives" series, Sex & Drugs, and noted The ABCs of Sex Education for Trainables as among those included, writing the film had the "impact of Freaks" and that it was intended to "guide teachers in mental institutions, who must try to train (not teach) those patients considered 'trainable', to know enough about their bodies and sex to neither be anti-social nor victimized in public". They commented upon the film addressing the issues directly by its showing "some very dedicated teachers taking on a really tough job". When they reviewed the DVD compilation "Educational Archives" School Locker in 2006, they made note that collections of educational films from Fantoma "included the best of the best in educational films", and that it was "hard to top marvels like The ABCs of Sex Education for Trainables", and that while this later compilation was not without merit, "it pales in comparison with the earlier releases".

DVD Verdict wrote that the film was "the flip side of all those sex education films directed at children", in how the "well-meaning short teaches teachers how to handle sex education for 'retardates,' or the developmentally disabled". They noted that the film tended to be more graphic when compared to the other films included on the "Educational Archives" series, Sex & Drugs, and though it tried "very hard to take its subject seriously[, n]evertheless, it comes across as very surreal".

Digitally Obsessed wrote that the ABC of Sex Education for Trainables was "produced by Planned Parenthood to train teachers of developmentally-challenged young adults (called 'trainables' here) about their bodies, reproduction, and the place of sexual relations in society". They noted that the film had a few scenes considered (in 2001) as humorous, but that the film "actually does the best job of dealing with the issues of sex in context with society," in how it dealt with such issues as anatomy, aspects of normal development and sexual maturity, the appropriateness of public masturbation, and being aware of exploitation, with the subjects "handled with tact and matter of factness". They concluded that stylistic problems aside, the film was "quite an interesting piece on what would present a real challenge to those caring for developmentally-challenged individuals, and their responsibilities as sexual beings", and that of the films making up the compilation, it was "the most educational, and least condescending sex education film of the lot."

== See also ==
- List of American films of 1975
