= Smirting =

Smoking outside of non-smoking areas

Smirting is the practice of smoking and flirting outside public places such as pubs, bars, cafés, restaurants, and office buildings where indoor smoking is prohibited.

== History ==
Smirting was first identified in New York in 2003, and spread to the Republic of Ireland in 2004 when an aggressive smoking ban in public places was enacted.

Smirting has been so successful that non-smokers try to mingle with the smirters. The non-smokers may then start to smoke too and so this is a health risk.

Sociologist and sexologist Pepper Schwartz states that the smirters are "defiant and angry, they don't buy the second-hand smoke argument, and want to share this grudge with someone else." When they are forced outside, smirters form strong bonds in what is essentially an exile community. But this exile community has its rewards. One study found that 25% of Irish couples who had started a relationship during 2007 or 2008 had met while smoking outside.
