= Sexually active life expectancy =

Expected time remaining while sexually active

Sexually active life expectancy is the average number of years remaining for a person to be sexually active. This population-based indicator extends the concept of health expectancy to the measure of sexuality (via sexual activity). Calculation of sexually active life expectancy uses the age-specific prevalence data on sexual activity in conjunction with life table data on survival probabilities to partition the number of person-years into years with and without sexual activity, which is based on the Sullivan method. The Sullivan method's objective is to understand the change of health in a given population over time.

== Studies ==
The measure of sexually active life expectancy was introduced by Lindau and Gavrilova. Through their study of two cohorts, researchers Lindau and Gavrilova found that sexual activity, a good quality sex life, and interest in sex were associated with self rated health in a positive way. Their research focused on midlife and later life health. This included ages 27 to 74 years and 57 to 85 years. In their findings, they concluded that a gender difference was present with increasing age. Evidence proved that men were more likely than women to be engaging in sexual activity. Men were also more likely to report that they were even interested in having sex and that they were having good quality sex. In addition, the research demonstrated that only 51.8% of women in a later stage of life reported being satisfied by their sexual life compared to 71.1% of men. Furthermore, their research showed that men in good or excellent health who participated in regular sexual activity lived an extra five to seven years, and women in substantially good health lived three to six years longer. Even though the gender gap is evident, the research provides a clear association between health and sexual activity.

A study of two large population-based U.S. surveys found that, on average, women expect fewer years of sexual activity, mainly due to prevalent widowhood among older women. This gender disparity is attenuated for people with a spouse or other intimate partner. The study also found that men tend to lose more years of sexually active life due to poor health.

Sexually active life expectancy is associated with self-reports of good health in both men and women. Sexuality has been identified as an important attribute to overall health and a marker of quality of life. Sexual desire has also been attributed to good health, good sexual functioning, positive sexual self-esteem, and a skillful partner. Physicians may find that sexually active life expectancy can be used as an incentive for patients to become (and stay) healthy. Institutional settings such as residential care facilities should focus on offering an accepting environment for sexually active older people.

== Barriers preventing sex ==
Although some people generalize that older adults do not participate in sex often, research shows that many older people enjoy participating in a variety of sexual activities. Barriers, both physically and mentally, is an important factor that influences older adults' sexual activities. These barriers can be seen at the individual, societal, and structural level. Some barriers include: lack of privacy, availability of sexual partner, mental health, and the impact of prescriptions on sexual desires.

=== Age-related barriers ===
Age-related factors can be identified through the decline of health. This can include declining fitness and mobility levels. Biological changes, such as menopause for women, can cause an unpleasant experience during sex. This can include painful intercourse and a lack of sex drive, however, many women have reported that not having to worry about becoming pregnant made them enjoy sexual activity more. The presence of diseases such as arthritis, can also greatly affect a person's sexual activities, however, this is evident for any age range. Factors such as a decrease in self esteem, confidence, and cognitive function can prohibit an older person from participating in sex or romantic partnerships. Having to live in an assisted living home has also created a physical barrier. People are less likely to have the privacy that they want when they are surrounded by other elderly people and nurses.

== Intimate relationships within institutional settings (residential care) ==
Despite the known benefits of continued sexual activity on physical, mental, and emotional health, nursing home residents often face barriers to sexual expression. These barriers rob them of fundamental aspects of self-worth, emphasizing the need for societal and institutional changes to support the sexual rights of the elderly. A study conducted in Wisconsin nursing homes found that elderly residents believe sexual activity is appropriate for their peers but often do not engage in it themselves, mainly due to lack of opportunity. This study also highlighted the reluctance of medical and behavioral personnel to discuss the topic, indicating a need for more open and supportive environments.

=== Legal and ethical issues ===
One of the main reasons residential homes do not care to facilitate intimate relationships is because employees may have a hard time distinguishing a desired sexual partnership from an undesired one. The residential care faces possible issues if a resident is being taken advantage of, especially if they are physically or mentally incapable to protect themselves. Facilities usually have a safeguarding and protection policy which monitors any relationship to prevent abuse.

Addressing inappropriate sexual behaviors in nursing homes can be challenging for staff. Strategies for managing such behaviors include improving privacy, educating staff, allowing conjugal or home visits, and assessing the decision-making capacity of cognitively impaired residents. Physicians can play a key role in removing barriers to sexual expression.
