= Formicophilia =

Form of zoophilia

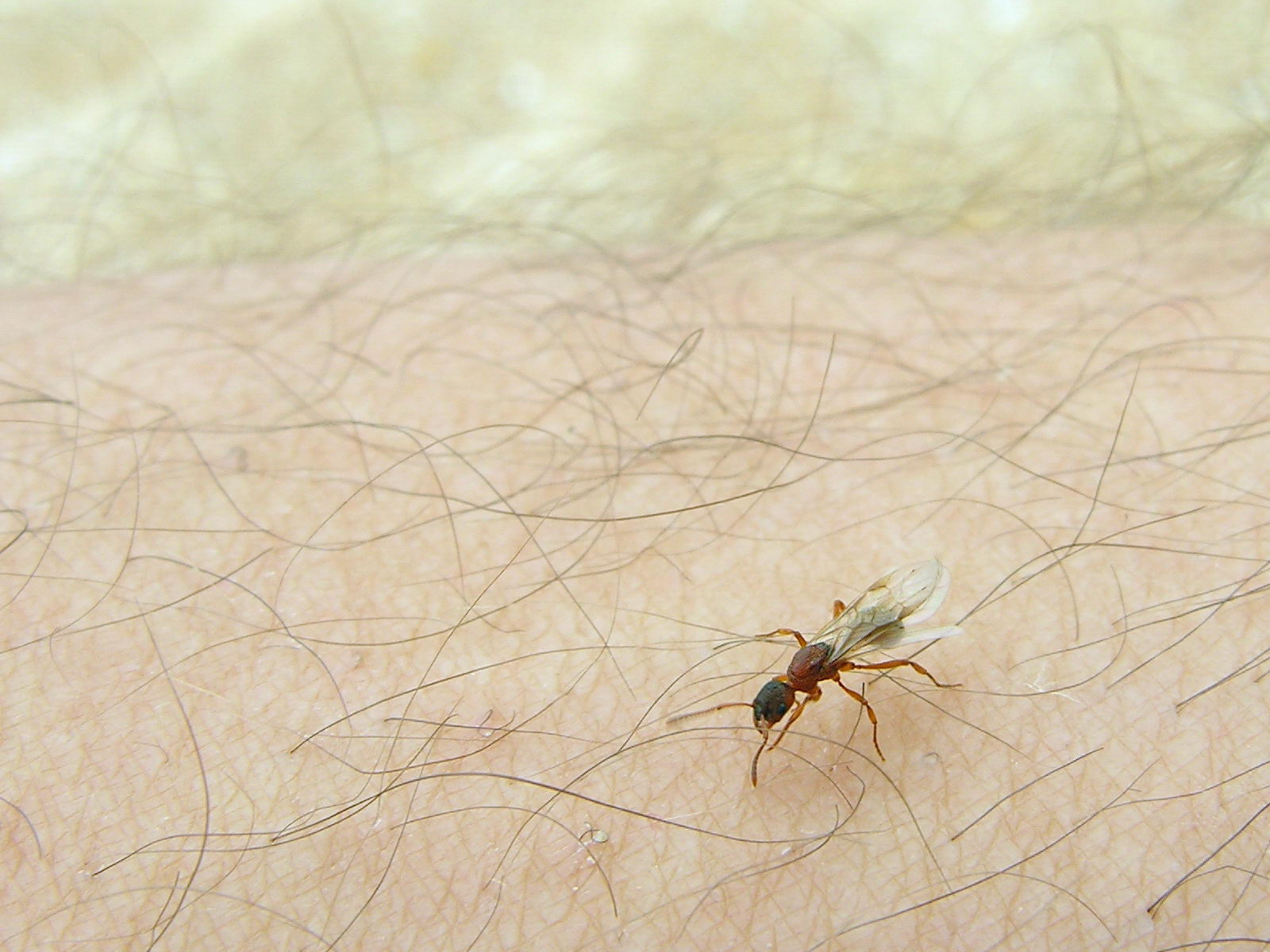
Ant on human flesh

Formicophilia is the sexual interest in being crawled upon or nibbled by insects, such as ants, or other small creatures. This paraphilia often involves the application of insects to the genitals, but other areas of the body may also be the focus. The desired effect may be a tickling, stinging, or in the case of slugs, slimy sensation, or the infliction of psychological distress on another person. The term was coined by Ratnin Dewaraja and John Money, a now commonly-discredited sexologist, in 1986 from the Latin formica (ant) + the Greek philia (love).

== Case studies ==
In the first reported case study, the patient had started keeping ants in a cupboard of his room as a hobby when he was nine. At this age, he enjoyed "the ticklish feeling" of the ants crawling on his legs and thighs. At age ten, he had a sexual relationship with another boy, and was beaten when his father discovered this. By the age of 13 or 14, he had added snails and cockroaches to his collection, and was becoming increasingly preoccupied with it. He had begun masturbating while the ants crawled on his legs. At age 28, he was masturbating several times a week while cockroaches crawled on his thighs and testicles, and snails crawled over his nipples and penis. Sometimes, he would hold a frog against his penis and enjoy the vibrations as it tried to escape. The patient was disgusted by his habit, but derived no pleasure from normal sexual activities. John Money suggested that the paraphilia developed as an alternative outlet after his normal sexual expression became associated with the trauma of his father's punishment.

Another case was described in 2012. At the age of 14, the patient saw an ice-cream stick covered with ants, and wondered how it would feel if his penis was in place of the stick. He began letting ants crawl on his genitals, especially fire ants, a practice he found sexually exciting and that continued into adulthood. The patient was socially and intellectually competent. He was also attracted to dogs and goats.

== See also ==
- Human parasite – Parasites which use humans as a host
