= Rusty trombone =

Sex act

Simple illustration of a rusty trombone

Rusty trombone is a sexual act in which a man stands with his knees and back slightly torqued with feet at least shoulder width apart to expose his anus. A person typically kneels behind the man and performs anilingus - more specifically, by pursing their lips and 'blowing a raspberry' on the anus - whilst reaching up beneath the scrotum or around the body to manually apply rapid back-and-forth motions on the penis, mimicking the techniques of a trombone player. The act is defined primarily by the physical orientation of the partners, the combination of anilingus with manual sexual stimulation and the resemblance of the anal sphincter to a trombone mouthpiece; however, other positions and variations are possible.

== Usage history ==
In 2003, the Detroit talk radio show Deminski & Doyle began an educational hour discussion of urban-legendary sex acts with the statement, "Try to describe carefully what a 'Cleveland steamer' would be..." and then went into details of the blumpkin and the rusty trombone. Fifteen months later, the Federal Communications Commission proposed a fine of $27,500 to the station's owner, Infinity Broadcasting, through a Notice of Apparent Liability (NAL) that specifically referenced rusty trombone.

Rusty trombone (dirty trombone) gained wider use in entertainment projects developed for release in 2005. For example, comedian Andy Dick used the term in the 2005 documentary film The Aristocrats as part of the infamous dirty joke of the same name. In seeming recognition of the phrase being a part of the filthiest of filthy language, news sources such as The Daily Telegraph, Slant Magazine, New Statesman, and The Globe and Mail highlighted rusty trombone in their review of The Aristocrats. In addition, in the 2005 movie The 40-Year-Old Virgin. the character Mooj stated, "It's not about these rusty trombones, and these dirty sanchez." In the film Tenacious D in The Pick of Destiny, actor Jack Black is seen walking around the Venice Beach, California boardwalk in a Rusty Trombone T-shirt. In the Late Late Show with Craig Ferguson, host Craig Ferguson kept an actual rusty trombone under his desk, which he would occasionally mention and reveal for comedic effect.

Rusty trombone is part of the 2006 party game PervArtistry, where individuals draw sexual pictures on a board, and other players try to guess the sexual synonym for that image.

In 2007, Salt Lake City, Utah activist David Nelson started an online petition calling for the repeal of Utah's existing sodomy law. Reportedly, Utah's sodomy law then prohibited oral sex, anal sex, and the rusty trombone.

Also, in 2007, the rusty trombone was listed as one of 76 entries in The Contemporary Dictionary of Sexual Euphemisms (2007), with its literal definition and sexual corollary.
