= Oculolinctus =

Activity involving licking the eyeballs for sexual pleasure

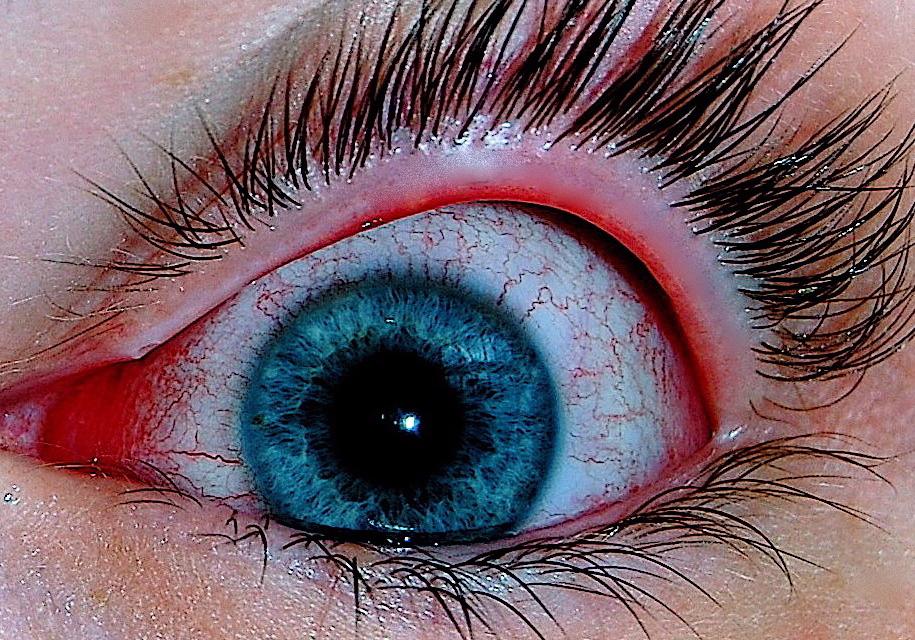
Licking eyeballs may cause viral conjunctivitis (pictured).

Oculolinctus, also known as "worming" or eyeball-licking, refers to the practice of licking eyeballs for erotic gratification. In mid-2013, English-language newspapers reported that this kink had allegedly become popular in Japan, where it was referred to as Gankyū name purei (眼球舐めプレイ; "eyeball licking play"). However, other media have reported that the existence of this practice is a hoax based on a story in a Japanese tabloid and many of the originally reporting articles were corrected or retracted as being possibly a hoax. The fetish for the eyes in particular is called oculophilia.

== Characteristics ==
In 2013, oculolinctus reportedly became popular among teenagers in Japan, causing a significant rise in eye infections. According to a retracted article by The Guardian, eyeball-licking was "seen as a new second-base; the thing you graduate to when kissing gets boring", possibly due to it being featured in a music video by the Japanese band Born. Further reports, e.g. in an article by the HuffPost later corrected as a possible hoax, showed an increase in Japanese schoolchildren wearing eyepatches due to eye infections arising from the act, with one school finding one third of 12-year-old students admitting to engaging in oculolinctus. There are also accounts of this practice in the U.S. Virgin Islands.

== Risks ==
The practice is associated with significant health risks, as tongues are coated with a film of microorganisms and saliva has enzymes that can break down. These microorganisms may cause infections in the eye such as conjunctivitis, herpes, chlamydia, corneal abrasions and corneal ulcers. Oral bacteria on the tongue can potentially enter corneal scratches caused by licking the eye, which then lead to infection.

Furthermore, there is also the risk of blindness from the resulting infections, as well as styes. The differing species in the microbiota of the eye and mouth is why it is no longer recommended to lick contact lenses before they are inserted into one's eye.

February 11, 2015 "CHIHIRO-chan no Gankyuuname" (チヒロちゃんの眼球舐め) - 黒百合と影
