= Michael Uebel =

American philosopher

Michael Uebel (born 1964), a pioneer in the application of psychological insights to the historical intersections of social, personal, and imaginative phenomena, is a psychotherapist and researcher in Austin, Texas. He has taught literature and critical theory at the University of Virginia, at Georgetown University, where he taught in the Communication, Culture, and Technology Program and the English Department, and at the University of Kentucky, where he held a faculty position in the Department of English, and was affiliated with the Committee on Social Theory and Women's Studies. From 2012-2015, Uebel was appointed Lecturer in the School of Social Work at the University of Texas at Austin. He served as Field Instructor in Social Work with the U.S. Department of Veterans Affairs from 2012-2020. Since 2016, he has been a Research Affiliate with the Office of the Assistant Dean for Research at the Steve Hicks School of Social Work (University of Texas at Austin). He is the author and/or editor of four major studies and the author of over 50 journal essays and encyclopedia articles. Uebel lectures nationally and internationally on issues concerning social history, mental health, and the challenges of humanism. In 2009, he co-founded the Interdependence Project-Austin, a branch of the New York city-based nonprofit organization (IDP) dedicated to fostering the intersection of the arts, activism, and contemplative traditions. Uebel served as Director of Contemplative Studies. He is an International Scholar of the British Psychoanalytic Council.

== Education ==
From the University of Wisconsin–Madison, Uebel received his B.A., with Distinction, in the fields of comparative literature and English literature. He completed both his M.A. and Ph.D. in literature at the University of Virginia, continuing his post-doctoral studies by earning the Master of Science in Social Work Degree from the University of Texas at Austin. He also studied psychotherapy at both the Houston-Galveston Psychoanalytic Institute and has been an instructor and student at the Austin Center for Relational Psychoanalysis and Psychotherapy.

== Research ==
Uebel's research is best situated within the field of intellectual history, and most broadly described as humanistic. Examining issues such as the formation of utopian thought, the ideology of gender relations, and the potentials of human existence, Uebel has urged a reconnaissance of disciplines as seemingly disparate as psychoanalysis, gerontology, philosophy, and the social sciences. Uebel is forging an approach to literary, philosophical, and social phenomena that eludes the narcissistic allegorization of history that mires much contemporary cultural studies work. Increasingly, Uebel's writing focuses on the currents of cultural analysis in the humanities.

== Major works ==
Uebel's major works to date include a work on the nature of equanimity from Eastern and Western philosophical perspectives (Seeds of Equanimity: Knowing and Being, 2025), a study of the legend of Prester John and utopian thought formation in the early Middle Ages (Ecstatic Transformation: On the Uses of Alterity in the Middle Ages, 2005), a volume of essays on the cultural intersections of race and masculinity (with Harry Stecopoulos, Race and the Subject of Masculinities, 1997), and a volume of essays on the significance of labor in the High Middle Ages (with Kellie Robertson, The Middle Ages at Work, 2004). He has also edited a volume of essays on medieval culture for New Literary History (1996).

== Selected articles and chapters ==
- "Irritability in Adult Depression and Anxiety: A Clinically Useful Signal amid an Imprecise Construct," The Canadian Journal of Psychiatry (2026): 1-3. doi: 10.1177/07067437261490170.
- "Authorship After Generative AI: Distributed Creativity and Relational Responsibility," with Bilal Hamamra, Philosophy & Technology (2026). doi: 10.1007/S13347-026-01170-W.
- "Generative AI and the Reconfiguration of Symbolic Authority: Implications of a Psychoanalytic View," with Bilal Hamamra, Human Arenas (2026). doi: 10.1007/s42087-026-00687-y.
- "Environmental and Embodied Knowledge: Luria for Psychiatry," The British Journal of Psychiatry 229 (2026): 68. doi: 10.1192/BJP.2026.10644.
- "The Virtue of a Purposeless Mind," Institute of Art and Ideas (IAI) News (2026). https://iai.tv/articles/equanimity-and-the-virtue-of-a-useless-mind-auid-3496
- "The Digital Unconscious in the Age of ChatGPT: Psychoanalytic Perspectives on Subjectivity, Desire, and Algorithmic Mediation," Psychodynamic Practice (2025): 1-9. doi: 10.1080/14753634.2025.2585997.
- "Equanimity is not stillness – it is a mobility of the mind," Psyche (Aeon), 14 April 2025. https://psyche.co/ideas/equanimity-is-not-stillness-it-is-a-mobility-of-the-mind
- "Anger in the Therapeutic Space: Healing through the Attitude of Equanimity," Psychodynamic Psychiatry, 53.1 (2025): 39–44. doi: 10.1521/pdps.2025.53.1.39.
- "Equanimity in Psychiatric Medicine: The Mind in the Middle," The British Journal of Psychiatry, 225 (2024): 413. doi: 10.1192/bjp.2024.63.
- "Architecture as Cause: Outlines for a Psychoanalytic Approach to Atmosphere via Film Noir," International Journal of Applied Psychoanalytic Studies, 21.3 (2024): e1886. doi: 10.1002/aps.1886.
- "Temporality and Apprey’s Hauntology for Psychoanalysis," in Transgenerational Haunting in Psychoanalysis: Toxic Errands by Maurice Apprey. New York: Routledge, 2023. 222–32. doi: 10.4324/9781003389026-16.
- "Equanimity for Anger: Creating Space for Difficult Emotions," The British Journal of Psychiatry, 223 (2023): 503. doi: 10.1192/bjp.2023.88.
- "'Man, the Prisoner of Logic': Toward an Optics of Equanimity" in Economics and Art Theory, Ed. Myrogiannis Efstratios & Constantinos Repapis. New York: Routledge, 2022. 175–94.
- "On the Use of Profane Language in Psychotherapy and Counseling: A Brief Summary of Studies over the Last Seven Decades," European Journal of Psychotherapy & Counselling, (2022). doi: 10.1080/13642537.2021.2001025
- "Technologies of Shame: Agency, Identity, Visibility," in Shame 4.0: Investigating an Emotion in Digital Worlds and the Fourth Industrial Revolution, Ed. Elisabeth Vanderheiden, Claude-Hélène Mayer & Paul Wong. New York: Springer, 2021. 575–91.
- "Empty Curriculum, Empty Mind: Teaching Mindfulness with Military Veterans," Journal of Humanistic Psychology, (2019): 1-20. doi: 10.1177/0022167819834737.
- "Positive and Negative Valences of the Human Body in Schizophrenia: A Pilot Study of Emotional Narrative Regarding the Front and Back," with Alfonso Santarpia, Giuseppe Alessandro Veltri, Herve Berreby, & Armando Amos Menicacci, New Ideas in Psychology, 54 (2019): 27–34. doi: 10.1016/j.newideapsych.2019.01.002.
- "Corpus Delicti: Frances Glessner Lee and the Art of Suspicion," Epidemiology and Psychiatric Sciences, (2017): 1–3. doi: 10.1017/S2045796017000543.
- "Dirty Rotten Shame? The Value and Ethical Functions of Shame," Journal of Humanistic Psychology, (2016): 1-20. doi: 10.1177/0022167816631398.
- "Pain Control," in Encyclopedia of Pharmacology and Society. Ed. Sarah E. Boslaugh. Thousand Oaks, CA: Sage 2016.
- "Taoism (Daoism)," in Encyclopedia of Alcohol: Social, Cultural, and Historical Perspectives. Ed. Scott C. Martin. Thousand Oaks, CA: Sage, 2015.
- "Mindfulness and Engaged Buddhism: Implications for a Generalist Macro Social Work Practice," with Clayton Shorkey, in Mindfulness and Acceptance in Social Work: Evidence-Based Interventions and Emerging Applications, Ed. Matthew S. Boone. Oakland, CA: New Harbinger Publications, 2014. 215–234.
- "History and Development of Instructional Technology and Media in Social Work Education," with Clayton Shorkey, The Journal of Social Work Education, 50.2 (2014): 247–261.
- "Psychoanalysis and the Question of Violence: From Masochism to Shame," American Imago, 69.4 (2012): 473–505.
- "Defense Analysis," "Lay Analysis," Psychoanalytic Terms and Concepts. Ed. Elizabeth Auchincloss and Eslee Samberg. New York/New Haven: American Psychoanalytic Association and Yale University Press, 2012.
- "Ecocentrism," in Green Ethics and Philosophy, vol. 8 of the Green Society series. Eds. Julie Newman & J. Geoffrey Golson. Thousand Oaks, CA, 2011.
- "Grassroots Moral Panics," in Encyclopedia of Drug Policy. Eds. Mark Kleiman, James Hawdon, J. Geoffrey Golson. Thousand Oaks, CA: Sage, 2011.
- "We Have Never Been Schreber: Paranoia, Medieval and Modern," with Erin Labbie, in The Legitimacy of the Middle Ages: On the Unwritten History of Theory. Ed. Andrew Cole & D. Vance Smith. Durham, NC: Duke University Press, 2010. 127–58.
- "Assessing Spiritual Dimensions of Chemical Dependence Treatment and Recovery: Research and Practice," with Shorkey, C., & Windsor, L., International Journal of Mental Health and Addiction, 6.3 (2008): 286–305.
- "Classical Psychoanalytic Thought, Contemporary Developments, and Clinical Social Work," with Roberta R. Greene, in Human Behavior Theory and Social Work Practice, ed. Roberta R Greene, 3rd Ed. New York: Haworth Press, 2008.
- "Minnesota Model," "Rational Recovery," "Secular Organization for Sobriety," with Clayton Shorkey, Encyclopedia of Substance Abuse Prevention, Treatment, and Recovery. Ed. Gary L. Fisher. Thousand Oaks, CA: Sage, 2008.
- "Gestalt Therapy," with Clayton Shorkey, Encyclopedia of Social Work, 20th Edition. Ed. Terry Mizrahi and Larry Davis. New York: Oxford University Press, 2008.
- "Gerontological Social Workers," with Roberta R. Greene, The Encyclopedia of Elder Care: The Comprehensive Resource on Geriatric and Social Care. 2nd Edition. Ed. Elizabeth Capezuti, Eugenia L. Siegler, & Mathy D. Mezey. New York: Springer, 2007.
- "Racism" and "Social Construction (Theoretical Perspectives)," Routledge International Encyclopedia of Men and Masculinities. Ed. Michael Flood, Judith Kegan Gardiner, Bob Pease, and Keith Pringle. New York: Routledge, 2007.
- "Sadomasochism," The Historical Encyclopedia of Prostitution and Sex Work. Ed. Melissa Hope Ditmore. New York: Greenwood Press, 2006.
- "Intervention Continued: Providing Care through Case Management," with Roberta R. Greene, Journal of Human Behavior in the Social Environment 14.1/2 (2007): 31–50. Also published in Contemporary Issues of Care, ed. Roberta R. Greene. New York: Routledge, 2007.
- "B(eing)-Students," Journal of Narrative Theory 37.2 (2007): 326–48.
- "Opening Time: Psychoanalysis and Medieval Culture," Cultural Studies of the Modern Middle Ages. Ed. Eileen Joy, Myra Seaman, Mary K. Ramsey, & Kimberly Bell. New York: Palgrave/Macmillan, 2007. 269–94.
- "Acoustical Alterity," Exemplaria 16.2 (2004): 349–65.
- "Striptopia?" Social Semiotics 14.2 (2004): 3–19.
- "Conceptualizing Labor in the Middle Ages," The Middle Ages at Work: Practicing Labor in Late Medieval England. Ed. Kellie Robertson & Michael Uebel. New York: Palgrave/Macmillan, 2004. 1–15.
