= Dacryphilia =

Paraphilia involving arousal from tears or crying

Dacryphilia (also known as dacrylagnia) is a form of paraphilia in which one is sexually aroused by tears or sobbing.

== Etymology ==
The term comes from the Greek words dacry- meaning "tears", and philia meaning "love".

== Research ==
Dacryphilia is an underexplored aspect of non-normative sexual interests. Psychologists Richard Greenhill and Mark D. Griffiths from Nottingham Trent University conducted the first empirical study on dacryphilia, published in March 2015. The study, comprising online interviews, included six females and two males, three of whom were also involved in BDSM. The researchers identified three themes: compassion, curled lips, and dominance/submission. The paraphilia may be experienced by those who do not consider themselves a dominant or submissive, and are motivated by compassion. Half of the participants, all women, associated dacryphilia with the arousal from comforting a crier due to compassion and shared a fantasy of meeting someone who has faced hardships and providing them comfort. Individuals with dacryphilia may find arousal when their partner cries during a movie or from the normal emotional vulnerability and strong feelings of love that may make a partner cry during intercourse.
