= Spermatogenesis arrest =

Medical condition affecting sperm cell production

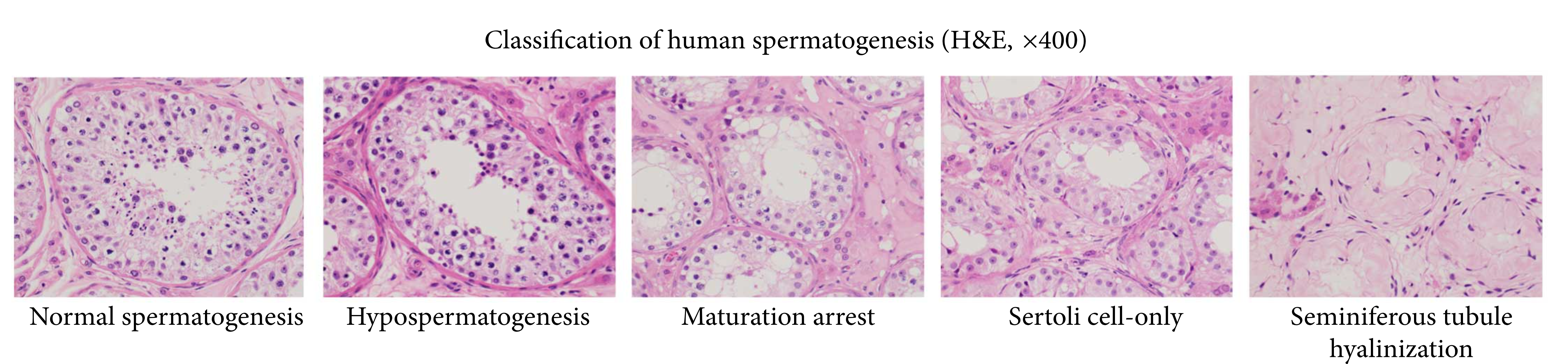
Histopathology of various spermatogenesis disorders.

Spermatogenesis arrest is known as the interruption of germinal cells of specific cellular type, which elicits an altered spermatozoa formation. Spermatogenic arrest is usually due to genetic factors resulting in irreversible azoospermia. However some cases may be consecutive to hormonal, thermic, or toxic factors and may be reversible either spontaneously or after a specific treatment. Spermatogenic arrest results in either oligospermia or azoospermia in men. It is quite a difficult condition to proactively diagnose as it tends to affect those who have normal testicular volumes; a diagnosis can be made however through a testicular biopsy.

== Effects ==
Spermatogenic arrest results in either oligospermia or azoospermia as mentioned above. Oligospermia is when extremely low concentrations of fertile sperm are found in semen or ejaculate, while azoospermia is when no fertile sperm are found in the semen or ejaculate.

== Causes ==
Spermatogenesis is controlled by androgens, namely testosterone and follicle-stimulating hormone (FSH), these are the most important androgens that control the process. FSH uses very specific G-coupled receptors that can be found only on Sertoli cells, this hormone is secreted by the pituitary gland, located in the brain. While testosterone, is produced within the testicles by Leydig cells. This hormone is the main androgenic steroid in the process of spermatogenesis and is regulated by a hormone known as luteinizing hormone. FSH plays a role in the spermatogenic capacity of the adult male as it controls the proliferation of Sertoli cells during either the perinatal or pubertal period, or both. However, testosterone has been found to be the most important hormone that is responsible for both the initiation and the maintenance of spermatogenesis. It is known that spermatogenesis is under the control of androgens, but germ cells (that will become gametes), do not express a functional androgen receptor, which are activated by the binding of androgenic hormones. It has been found through studies that spermatogenetic arrest tends to occur in the late spermatocyte/spermatid stage when the androgen receptor activation in Sertoli cells is interrupted or affected in some way. However, other studies have found that the condition can be due to either genetic factors or a variety of secondary factors.

=== Chemotherapy ===
When using chemotherapy treatments, the possibility of azoospermia is dependent on the dose, duration, number and type of drugs used; the male's fertility status before the treatment occurred is also taken into consideration.

=== Radiotherapy ===
The use of radiotherapy can cause a temporary bout of azoospermia, this however, is dependant solely on the nature of the dose that are delivered to the testes. Those who experience less than 100 rads will recover in 9–18 months, doses of 200-300 rads will recover in 30 months and doses of 400-600 rads will recover in less than or equal to five years. An irreversible sterility may occur however, for those experiencing a single dose field with 600-800 rads.

=== Nutritional Factors ===
Studies have shown that Vitamin A deficiencies in rats , as well as zinc deficiencies in human males may prevent the normal functioning of spermatogenesis.

=== Heat ===
Heat may also be the cause of oligozoospermia which can lead to both partial and reversible spermatogenic arrest.

=== Infections ===
After the occurrence of an infectious disease in humans, such as hypothermia and/or the presence of toxic or infectious factors spermatogenic arrest is likely to follow, however, the condition may be normalized once antibiotic and anti-inflammatory treatments have been put into effect.

== Treatment ==
Various treatments have been discovered in order to aid those with spermatogenesis arrest, one of these being through the use of arginine. A study done by Jungling and Bunge in 1976 had a small breakthrough in the field by orally distributing arginine, daily to a group of infertile men. Of the eighteen men in the test group only one experienced an increase in sperm count, while others saw no improvement; these men also experienced a decreased sperm motility. However, one of the patients in the group successfully impregnated his wife while taking part in the study. More recently, more successful treatments have been developed, such as through the use of gonadotropin treatment. A study conducted by Selman and El-Danasouri in 2006 proved that using long-term gonadotropin therapy on infertile men can improve sperm production quantitatively and increase sperm population in some patients and can in turn provide a successful in-vitro fertilization treatment. These results were found using men that had normal hormone levels but had spermatogenic arrest. These men were treated using FSH treatments and had testicular biopsy's performed on them before and after the treatment had been administered in order to track progress.
