= Legal objections to pornography in the United States =

In the United States, distribution of "obscene, lewd, lascivious, or filthy" materials is a federal crime. The determination of what is "obscene, lewd, lascivious, or filthy" is up to a jury in a trial, which must apply the Miller test; however, due to the prominence of pornography in most communities most pornographic materials are not considered "patently offensive" in the Miller test.

In 1967, Denmark decriminalized pornography, and the following year, the United States Supreme Court held that people could view whatever they wished in the privacy of their own homes. These two developments contributed in part to Congress creating the President's Commission on Obscenity and Pornography in 1968 to investigate the effects of obscenity and pornography on the people of the United States. Each member of the Commission was appointed by President Lyndon B. Johnson. In what became the most detailed and comprehensive investigation into pornography to date, the Commission in its final report found that pornography could not be shown to do harm to individuals or to society, and recommended the repeal of obscenity and pornography legislation as it related to adults. Released during the presidency of Richard Nixon, the report generated a brief bout of controversy but was ultimately ignored by the administration.

Attorney General for Ronald Reagan Edwin Meese also courted controversy when he appointed the "Meese Commission" to investigate pornography in the United States; their report, released in July 1986, was highly critical of pornography and itself became a target of widespread criticism. That year, Meese Commission chairman Alan E. Sears sent letters on Commission letterhead to the heads of 23 convenience store chains and other companies, declaring that the Commission would find that they were distributors of pornography and threatening that they would be listed as such in the final Report. In fact, the list of purported distributors had been identified by Donald Wildmon, the head of the conservative Christian advocacy organization that later became the American Family Association. The letters triggered several companies to remove common soft-core pornography magazines as Playboy and Penthouse from store shelves. The American Booksellers Association, the Council for Periodical Distributors Associations, the Magazine Publishers of America, and the publishers of Playboy and Penthouse sued, arguing that the letters constituted prior restraint and were forbidden under the First Amendment. The U.S. District Court for the District of Columbia agreed, leading it to admonish the Commission order it to withdraw the letter, and forbid it to issue any list of retailers in the report.

In the United States in 2005, George W. Bush's Attorney General Alberto Gonzales made obscenity and pornography a top prosecutorial priority of the Department of Justice.

The conservative religious organization Concerned Women for America polled every U.S. attorney's office to find out what they planned to do about obscenity. Except for a handful of offices that did not return calls, not one said it had any inclination to pursue anything other than child obscenity cases.

== See also ==
- Miller v. California
