= Interracial personals =

Interracial personals or interracial personal ads are personal advertisements intended to find romantic partners or friends of other races.

== Overview ==
Interracial personals are a fast-growing niche among internet dating sites. A recent survey found that most users of social network services thought these sites were mildly offensive, although some felt that they are representative of the diversity of the human race and found nothing objectionable about it.

Surveys indicate that many people are interested in dating or marrying people of other races. An online survey conducted in October 2001 found that 49% of students said they had dated someone of a different race. Thirty-eight percent said they had not, but might. According to one news report, there were 117,000 black wife-white husband couples in the United States in 2006, an increase from 95,000 such couples in 2000. In 1960, before the U.S. Supreme Court overturned laws against mixed marriages, there were only 26,000 black wife-white husband couples.

Online interracial dating services assist such people by making it easier for them to find other people interested in interracial relationships. The use of a site with interracial personals, as opposed to a general internet dating site, can save a person considerable time and effort. A recent study of Google AdSense ads that appeared on interracial dating sites indicated that many of the larger dating sites are trying to cater to this market as well, and some even claim to be interracial dating sites, but users often find themselves sifting through profiles on the major sites such as Match.com or Yahoo! Personals trying to find people who are looking to date outside their race.

Some online dating services allow people to register for free, but making full use of the services available on the site often requires a monthly fee. Some users have complained that the rules concerning fees are not clear, or that employees of the services fraudulently "flirt" with users as their subscriptions are about to end, encouraging them to renew.
