= Desire discrepancy =

Difference between a desired sexual intercourse frequency and the actual frequency

Sexual desire disorder (SDD) is the difference between one's desired frequency of sexual intercourse and the actual frequency of sexual intercourse within a relationship. Among couples seeking sex therapy, problems of sexual desire are the most commonly reported dysfunctions, yet have historically been the most difficult to treat successfully. Sexual satisfaction in a relationship has a direct relationship with overall relationship satisfaction and relationship well-being. Sexual desire and sexual frequency do not stem from the same domains, sexual desire characterizes an underlying aspect of sexual motivation and is associated with romantic feelings while actual sexual activity and intercourse is associated with the development and advancement of a given relationship. Thus together, sexual desire and sexual frequency can successfully predict the stability of a relationship. While higher individual sexual desire discrepancies among married individuals may undermine overall relationship well-being, higher SDD scores for females may be beneficial for romantic relationships, because those females have high levels of passionate love and attachment to their partner. Studies suggest that women with higher levels of desire relative to that of their partners' may experience fewer relationship adjustment problems than women with lower levels of desire relative to their partners'. Empirical evidence has shown that sexual desire is a factor that heavily influences couple satisfaction and relationship continuity which has been one of the main reasons for the interest in this research domain of human sexuality.

== Heterosexual couples ==
=== Marital couples ===
In married couples, husbands have been found to experience higher sexual desire discrepancies than their wives. Those who individually experience higher rates of sexual desire discrepancy during their marriage exhibit lower levels of satisfaction in the relationship. This high discrepancy has also been found to impair other aspects of the relationship. For example, an increase in relationship instability, more negative communication within the relationship and an increase in conflict all result from high desire discrepancies.

It has also been established that sexual desire and frequency of sex decreased as the length of marriage increased. Further investigation has revealed that this attenuation occurs within the first 2 years of marriage. In heterosexual couples, women's low sexual desire is often pathologized. However, researchers propose that low desire in women partnered with men may be influenced by heteronormative structures and gender inequities. These structures result in an inequitable distribution of household and caregiving labor, which can reduce sexual desire. Additionally, heteronormativity often assigns women caregiver roles for their male partners, positioning them more as mothers or caregivers than sexual partners. Furthermore, the objectification of women emphasizes the importance of being desired over experiencing desire.

=== Non-marital couples ===
High desire discrepancies affect men differently to women in a relationship. Men experience reduced sexual satisfaction while women experience reduced relationship satisfaction. Other studies have found men also experience lower relationship satisfaction when desire discrepancy is high. Furthermore, research by Davies, Katz and Jackson (1999) shows that of the individuals studied, approximately 25% reported believing their personal level of sexual desire to be different from that of their partner's, implying that not all couples who experience SDD label it as such.

== Same-sex couples ==
=== Lesbian couples ===
Low sexual desire discrepancies (low sexual desire and low sexual frequency) are common amongst lesbian couples, similar to heterosexual women in a relationship. The sexual frequency between lesbian couples are reported as less frequent in comparison to gay male, heterosexual, married and unmarried couples. To support this notion, a study looked at 1,500 lesbian women who were in a relationship where 78% were initially uninvolved in sexual activities. Blumstein and Schwartz reported in ‘American Couples’ that in a sample of lesbian women in a relationship, half of the lesbian sample had low levels of sexual contact and stated that they were dissatisfied with their sexuality suggesting low sexual desire, therefore low SDD. As well as this, the lesbian sample had reported high sexual desire and frequency at the beginning of their relationship and a pattern appeared with a decrease of sexual activity within long-term relationships. However, this study comes with various criticisms. (see Lesbian bed death:criticisms).

Studies show that homosexual women are particularly prone to internalizing negative homophobic societal attitudes which has detrimental affects on their self-esteem and identity. It has been proposed that homosexual women sometimes show a tendency of using defenses in an attempt to deny their homosexuality in a homophobic society. Lesbian women may thus manifest strong emotional connections to their partners but repress any sexual desires due to an unconscious internalization of society's homophobic attitudes which ultimately manifests itself in a reduced sexual desire and sexual intercourse frequency.

In same-sex relationships for women, those with low sexual desire discrepancies mean that women experience low sexual activity and low satisfaction for their sexual relationship. Although, at early stages of their relationship, it is common to find high relationship satisfaction and no issues with low desire discrepancy, meaning that a good sexual satisfaction should exist. As well as lesbian women commonly reporting low sexual desire in their relationship, they also report low arousal, more issues with lubrication, low sexual satisfaction and low sexual frequency as the relationship length increases. However, research suggests that given the fact that lesbian couples in a relationship are seen to have lower sexual activity, they are likely to be satisfied with their sexual frequency similar to heterosexual women in their relationship highlighting the fact that low desire discrepancies may not necessarily be an issue for women.

An explanation for low desire discrepancies for lesbian couples can be explained by the “lesbian bed death” myth, which argues that sexual activity will significantly reduce in same-sex relationships as the length of the relationship increases, which supports the idea that lesbian couples experience high SDD at early stages in their relationships compared to later on. Another explanation for SDD in lesbian couples could be that women are more "sensual rather than sexual" and so are less likely to participate in overtly sexual activities.

==== Treatment ====
It has been proposed that among lesbian couples, SDD or Inhibited Sexual Desire (ISD) masks other underlying emotions, namely anger. Thus, exercises targeting underlying anger such as creating lists of "grievances" and encouraging the couple to pretend argue during a treatment session can be used to address the issues of underlying feelings of anger in an attempt to alleviate sexual dysfunction.

When the believed cause for sexual desire discrepancy is believed to be a form of internalized homophobia, it is recommended to begin a treatment session with a questionnaire inquiring about the individuals' feelings towards being homosexual ("How do you feel about being lesbian?", "Have you ever felt suicidal as a result of your homosexuality?", "In what way do you think homosexual people are different from heterosexual people?"). The following suggested treatment is referrals to lesbian social and education groups for an exposure to positive homosexual role models.

=== Gay couples ===
To date, there is only a limited hand of research on gay couples sexual desire and sexual frequency.

Gay males' desire for a sexual partner stems from a male's physical attractiveness and features and signs of youth. They also favour sexual activities as the fundamental component of a gay relationship. Research by Blumstein and Schwartz depicts that gay men had higher levels of sexual frequencies in comparison to lesbian women throughout all stages of their relationship.

Given that there is a lack of research on sexual desire amongst homosexual male couples, it is difficult to make definitive assumptions. However, there is research on sexual satisfaction amongst gay couples. Sexual satisfaction and sexual frequency are correlated amongst gay couples. A study showed that most gay couples were sexually satisfied with their partner, with 83% of men reporting "satisfied" and 7% "very satisfied". Amongst young gay male couples in (average length was 15 months), the median rating for sexual satisfaction on a 7-point scale was 5.8 and Black gay male couples reported 5.5 on the 7 point scale. As well as this, males have higher testosterone levels in comparison to females. Testosterone is able to fuel sex drive amongst men and women. Gay couples, therefore together obtain more testosterone thus, ultimately could be a suggestion as to why gay couples have more sexual encounters than lesbian and heterosexual couples. Thus, suggesting that gay couples desire discrepancy involves high sexual desire and high sexual frequency (however, research is needed to confirm this). Despite such reports, literature states that gay men can vary between sexual desire and sexual frequencies, conveying that gay male couples may not always obtain high sexual desires and high sexual frequencies. Even so, sexual frequency amongst gay couples can also reduce over time, similar to lesbian couples and heterosexual couples. This conveys that currently, there is no definitive conclusion on desire discrepancy amongst gay couples. However, when gay men are clinically diagnosed with Male Hypoactive Sexual Desire Disorder (see Desire Discrepancy Disorders below), clinicians take self-inflicted homophobia, interpersonal issues, attitude, lack of appropriate sex education and early life experience trauma into account as possible predisposition factors for the onset of the disorder.

==== Treatment ====
Re-labeling internal cues is one path of SDD treatment in gay couples. Zilbergeld and Ellison (1980) proposed that sometime when an individual believes they feel a desire for sexual intercourse, what they actually feel is a desire for interpersonal closeness and reassurance. In such cases, treatment focuses on teaching individuals how to differentiate desires for closeness from desires for sexual intercourse and express them in a more appropriate manner.

Sometimes, desire discrepancy may arise when partner A feels repeatedly rejected after their attempts at initiating sex. This may be because partner B is simply not interested or not in the mood but may also be because partner B just happens to be more passive in nature and thus relies on partner A to do the initiating. In such cases, it is suggested that feelings of both partners should be discussed and their patterns of initiating and rejecting explored.

== Desire discrepancy disorders ==
In one of the previous editions of the Diagnostic and Statistical Manual (DSM-4), a particularly low degree of sexual desire would have been the main diagnostic criteria for hypoactive sexual desire disorder (HSDD). However, since the release of the DSM-5 in 2013, the disorder has been redefined and distinguished by gender differences being female sexual interest/arousal disorder and male hypoactive sexual desire disorder.

Research has found for both men and women suffering from low sexual desire on a clinical level, significantly lower levels of sexual satisfaction as well as lower levels of overall relationship adjustment are reported. Due to its adverse effects on an individual's sexual satisfaction, it has been shown to negatively affect a relationship overall.

=== Female sexual interest/arousal disorder (FSIAD) ===
According to the DSM-5, females who have experienced a lack of sexual interest/arousal for a period of at least 6 months can be diagnosed with FSIAD. This condition is specified by a lessened desire for, and pleasure from, sexual activity in the absence of other non-sexual mental disorders, medical conditions or relationship distress (e.g. domestic violence). It is also characteristic for the individual to experience clinical distress as a result of the condition which can be further classified as either mild, moderate or severe distress.

The DSM-5 notes that low desire discrepancy, whereby a woman has a lower desire for sex than her partner, is not sufficient for the diagnosis of FSIAD but rather a reduction or absence in:

- sexual activity
- sexual fantasies
- receptivity to partner's initiation of sexual activity
- receptivity to internal or external cues for sexual activity
- sensations in genital or non-genital regions during sexual activity

The disorder can be further subdivided as either:

- Lifelong: apparent since the woman became sexually active.
- Acquired: onset occurred after normal sexual functioning.
- Generalised: present across different partners, contexts or type of stimulations.
- Situational: limited to certain partners, contexts or type of stimulations.

It is associated with dyspareunia, mood disorders, problems orgasming and dysfunctional relationships. The DSM also states that women who experience FSIAD may also hold unconventional expectations of what a 'normal' level of sexual interest is and a lack of knowledge of sexuality.

==== Risk factors ====
Problems with relationships and social development history (e.g. relationship with caregiver or childhood stressors) and a history with mental disorders have been shown to be influencing factors. Certain medical conditions such as diabetes mellitus and thyroid dysfunction are clinically known to predispose women to FSIAD.

==== Assessment tool ====
The Sexual Interest and Desire Inventory–Female (SIDI-F) was created as a tool for clinicians to assess FSIAD in female patients. It is a 13 item scale is reportedly holds high internal consistency and high internal validity. It is the most credible measurement tool to date and is the most specified tool for assessing FSIAD (formerly known and referred to HSDD in women in the original paper).

=== Male hypoactive sexual desire disorder (MHSDD) ===
The DSM 5 has characterised the diagnostic features of MHSDD as males experiencing deficient or no erotic fantasies and desire for sexual activity for a period of at least 6 months. The level of deficiency in patients is determined by clinicians who take factors such as age and socio-cultural environment of the individual into account which may affect the individual's sexual functioning. The manifestation of personal distress due to the disorder in the absence of non-sexual disorders, significant relationship stress, other forms of stress and other medical conditions distinguishes MHSDD. As with FSIAD, it can also be subdivided into the subtypes: lifelong, acquired, generalised, situational and distress severity can be classified as either: mild, moderate or severe.

Aspects that differentiate MHSDD from FSIAD include associative features such as erectile or ejaculatory problems and a particularly low sex desire manifested in a lack of sex initiation which is usually led by the male.

==== Risk factors ====
Mood symptoms of anxiety are seemingly strong indicators of low desire in men. Approximately half of the men who have experienced psychiatric symptoms in the past are more likely to experience a significant loss in sexual desire relative to those without this history (15%). The use of alcohol may be a resultant outcome of this disorder. Hyperprolactinemia (a disorder of the endocrine system) and hypogonadism has also been associated with affecting men's sexual desire.

==== Prevalence ====
This disorder is more prevalent in older men aged between 66 and 74 years old (41%) and fewer young men aged between 18 and 24 (6%). Overall, however, this condition only affects a small proportion of the male population (1.8%) for men aged between 16 and 44. Prevalence also varies cross culturally with higher rates experienced in men from Southeast Asia (28%) compared to Northern European men (12.5%).

== Desire discrepancy and gender ==
=== Gender differences ===
Gender differences exist in the frequency of experiencing sexual desire, with men showing a higher frequency than women in all stages of relationships. Furthermore, there are gender differences in the causes attributed to sexual desire. Men are more likely to consider their sexual desire to stem from erotic environmental factors whereas women are more likely to view interpersonal factors and intimacy as playing a greater role in their sexual desire. Men are known to desire the same frequency of sexual intercourse in their current relationship and this is persistent one year later. However women have low sexual desires as the relationship length continues. This is thought to be in part due to inequitable household labor in domestic relationships. More equitable household labor distribution is associated with higher dyadic desire in women in heterosexual relationships.

Between both men and women, it has been found that vaginal sex, kissing and sexually stimulating caressing have been positively associated with no discrepancy between desired and actual frequency of sexual intercourse (otherwise referred to as sexual satisfaction).

=== Reasons for gender differences ===
Women's sexual desire has historically been seen to be much weaker than men's, with sexual urges portrayed to be less strong than men's sexual urges. Reasons for women's low sexual desire may be due to the understanding that sexual intercourse leads to pregnancy. Engaging in sexual intercourse requires a woman to invest 9 months in pregnancy, whereas a male's investment is based solely on how much time he wishes to commit to the partner. Thus, there are differential costs to engage in sexual activity which can affect a woman's sexual desire.

Another reason why women are more likely to have low sexual desire and less sexual activity compared to men may be because when enduring in copulation with a male, women's experience of achieving an orgasm is low. Therefore, a females gratification for sexual intercourse may be lower than a males, where a male is able to enjoy sex consistently compared to a female, signifying why average sexual desire is usually higher.

Another reason for this difference may be due to differences in levels of testosterone between men and women. Males possess significantly higher levels of testosterone levels in comparison to females. Studies have shown the importance of testosterone levels and its effect on sexual desire. For example, female-to-male transgender individuals were administered testosterone and reportedly experienced higher levels of sexual arousal and desire. The opposite occurred for male-to-female transgender people who received androgen deprivation (antiandrogens), who reportedly experienced a decrease in sexual desire. Even so, a study looked at women who had their ovaries removed. The females received high doses of testosterone as a treatment therapy. There were increased levels of sexual motivation, sexual fantasies, masturbation, as well as reports of increased sexual intercourse with the testosterone treatment. Nevertheless, studies do not find a clear link between testosterone concentration and sexual desire in premenopausal females with normal ovarian function.

A consistent finding across culture, religions, relationship status and sexual orientations is that men tend to experience higher sexual desire discrepancy than women. Men value giving and receiving sex orally more than women and men report higher rates of intercourse than women do. Therefore, the higher value placed on sexual acts and the greater desired frequency of sex in men may be another contributing reason as to why their sexual desire discrepancy is higher than women's overall.

Evolutionary perspectives suggest that partners' sexual desire are usually high during the start of the relationship. This high sexual drive can instigate individuals to become closely connected to one another. This sexual desire is ultimately reduced throughout the course of the relationship in order to focus on producing and rearing children. Women ultimately may incur decreases of sexual desire once they feel they have achieved a connection with their partner. However, with men this is not the case and will continually wish to participate in sexual activity. Men can experience decreases in sexual desires but due to the expectations of male sexual principles, it may not be reasonable for a man to confess to this matter as they should invariably possess high sexual desires.

McCarthy and McDonald highlighted that there are variations in men's sex drive signifying that solid conclusions should not be made. As well as this, both males and females have reported in engaging in sexual activities with the low sexual desire levels therefore highlighting that sexual desire and sexual behaviour are not always intertwined.

== Age ==
Age is an important factor in understanding human sexuality. From adolescence, to adults, to old age, an individual experiences changes in sexual desires and sexual frequencies. This is predominantly due to biological changes, such as testosterone levels and environmental factors, such as cultural influences.

To date, there is little research on SDD amongst adolescents.

=== Old age ===
Sexual desire discrepancy (SDD) declines from adolescence into older age, where sexual desire and sexual frequency both decrease. Data suggests that female sexual desire is not affected by age, however, the majority of data shows that sexual desire is affected by age and decreases as age increases. For older women, sexual desire can be determined by one's relationship context, i.e. whether she has a partner or not, but a man's sexual desire is not determined by this. With men between the ages 40 and 70 years old, sexual desire, sexual thoughts and sexual dreams gradually decline with age. However, Diokono and researchers showed that almost 74% of married men above the age of 60 were sexually active, and 63% of men aged between 80 and 102 years were also sexually active.

There are several reasons for the changes in sexual desire discrepancies, that is low sexual desire and low sexual frequencies. From a biological perspective, as an individual ages, sex hormones change. For men, levels of testosterone reduce with age and by the time a man is 80, testosterone levels are likely to be one sixth of a young man. However, testosterone level has not been regarded to correlate with sexual drive/desire, but bioavailable testosterone levels were correlated with sexual desire and erectile functions (total testosterone level is the sum of bioavailable testosterone and sex hormone binding globulin (SHBG)). In women ovaries create 95% of estradiol (a sex hormone), but during menopause estradiol is terminated by the ovaries. This means estrogen levels decline as a woman becomes older, which creates changes to a woman's hormone levels and can ultimately reduce vaginal lubrication. This signifies that a reduction in the frequency of sexual intercourse among older women may be because sexual intercourse can become uncomfortable.

Other factors for low SDD in older individuals may be illness. The effects on sexual ability and partaking in sexual intercourse can be influenced by illnesses such as arthritis, cardiovascular disease and diabetes, where these are co-morbid with age.

Attitudes towards an individual's self and towards their sexual partner can too affect sexual behaviour and sexual desire. A negative view of sex in older men and women are common attitudes held. With regards to "attitudes" in culture, sex appeal factors in America tend to be placed on youthful appearances such as smooth clear skin, rather than aged skin. There is also a stereotype that older people are physically unattractive, unable to achieve sexual arousal and have a lack of sexual interest. Another cultural attitude is that sexual acts amongst older women who are post-menopausal are deemed to be inappropriate due to the fact that sexual intercourse is for reproduction and women can no longer reproduce therefore they should not be sexually active.

== Theoretical considerations ==
Given the subjective nature of human sexuality, it is important that the findings from the various studies within this field are taken tentatively. The most prevalent limitation to most of the research conducted on desire discrepancy comes from the low diversity samples. Most research in this domain, and Psychology generally, tends to be conducted on university students and the samples also remain unrepresentative.

Further limitations can be found in the definitions used to define sexual desire which can be misconstrued for sexual arousal which then affects the psychometric testing taking place. Different definitions of the same concepts can lead to contradictory findings of a given study with studies of the past and can thereby lead to circular, as opposed to progressive, debates in the literature.

Although research has been able to establish that throughout the duration of a relationship, there is a decrease in sexual desire but increase in intimacy there has been a lack of research investigating these specific two factors.

== See also ==
- Sexual frustration
- Human sexual activity

== Sources ==
- https://web.archive.org/web/20080726170958/http://www.womhealth.org.au/healthjourney/lowlibido.htm
- https://www.abc.net.au/health/features/stories/2006/10/25/1836146.htm
- http://www.sexualityandu.ca/adults/sex-6.aspx
- http://living.health.com/2008/02/08/synchronized-sex/
