= R v Hess; R v Nguyen =

- Supreme Court of Canada

Hearing: February 1, 1990 Judgment: October 4, 1990
- Full case name: Victor John Hess v Her Majesty The Queen; Van Hung Nguyen v Her Majesty The Queen
- Citations: [1990] 2 S.C.R. 906
- Ruling: Appeal allowed.

Court membership
- Chief Justice: Brian Dickson; Puisne Justices: Antonio Lamer, Bertha Wilson, Gérard La Forest, Claire L'Heureux-Dubé, John Sopinka, Charles Gonthier, Peter Cory, Beverley McLachlin

Reasons given
- Majority: Wilson J., joined by Lamer C.J.(*) and La Forest and L'Heureux-Dubé JJ. (*)Chief Justice at time of judgment
- Dissent: McLachlin J., joined by Gonthier J.
- Dickson C.J., Cory and Sopinka JJ. took no part in the consideration or decision of the case.

R v Hess; R v Nguyen, [1990] 2 S.C.R. 906 is a decision of the Supreme Court of Canada where the Court struck down part of the Criminal Code offence of having sexual intercourse with a female under the age of fourteen as a violation of section 7 of the Canadian Charter of Rights and Freedoms.

== Background ==
Victor Hess and Van Nguyen were both charged in two separate incidents with having sexual intercourse with a female under the age of fourteen contrary to section 146(1) of the Criminal Code. The provision specifically prohibited a male from having sex with a female under the age of fourteen "whether or not he believes that she is fourteen years of age or more".

In Hess's trial, the conviction was quashed on the basis that the offence violated section 15 of the Charter. The verdict was overturned at the Court of Appeal and a new trial was ordered.

In Nguyen's trial, he was convicted, which was upheld on appeal. The court did not find a violation of section 15, but there was a violation of section 7, which was saved under section 1.

The question before the Supreme Court was whether the criminal provision violated sections 7 or 15 of the Charter.

== Opinion of the Court ==
Justice Wilson, writing for the majority, found a violation of section 7 as the provision did not require a mens rea element in establishing the offence as the accused did not need to know the girl's age. Wilson noted that a provision that convicts morally innocent individuals as a means to control a certain area of crime is inconsistent with the principles of fundamental justice. She further noted that this form of constructive culpability was not proportional and so it could not be justified through judicial discretion.

As a remedy, the Court severed the infringing words from the text so that to secure a conviction, it must be proved that the accused knew the girl was under fourteen (or was wilfully blind to that fact).
