= Sexual activity during pregnancy =

Overview of sexual activity while expecting a child

Four positions for vaginal sex which are easier during pregnancy than the missionary position

Most women can continue to engage in sexual activity during pregnancy, including sexual intercourse. Most research suggests that during pregnancy both sexual desire and frequency of sexual relations decrease. In the context of this overall decrease in desire, some studies indicate a second-trimester increase, preceding a decrease during the third trimester.

Sex during pregnancy is a low-risk behavior except when the healthcare provider advises that sexual intercourse be avoided for particular medical reasons. For a healthy pregnant woman, there are a variety of safe ways to have sex during pregnancy.

== Desire and frequency ==
Most research suggests that, during pregnancy, sexual desire and frequency of sexual relations decrease. In the context of this overall decrease in desire, some studies indicate a second-trimester increase, preceding a decrease. However, these decreases are not universal: a significant number of women report greater sexual satisfaction throughout their pregnancies.

== Safety ==
Sex during pregnancy is a low-risk behaviour except when the physician advises that sexual intercourse be avoided, because it may, in some pregnancies, lead to serious pregnancy complications or health issues such as a high risk for premature labour or a ruptured uterus. Such a decision may be based upon a history of difficulties in a previous childbirth. However, it has been observed that evidence in this area is lacking and physicians' advice is more likely to be based on supposition than scientific knowledge.

During pregnancy, the fetus is protected from sexual thrusting and unwanted semen by the amniotic fluid in the womb and by the cervical mucus plug in the woman's cervix, which forms shortly after conception.

== Benefits ==
=== Psychological usefulness ===
Some studies in the 1980s and 1990s contend that it is useful for pregnant women to continue to be sexually active, specifically noting that overall sexual satisfaction was correlated with feeling happy about being pregnant, feeling more attractive in late pregnancy than before pregnancy, and experiencing orgasm. Sexual activity has also been suggested as a way to prepare for induced labor; some believe the natural prostaglandin content of seminal fluid can favor the maturation process of the cervix, making it more flexible, allowing for easier and faster dilation and effacement of the cervix. However, the efficacy of using sexual intercourse as an induction agent "remains uncertain".

=== Prevention of pre-eclampsia ===
There is tentative evidence for exposure to partner's semen as prevention for pre-eclampsia, largely due to the absorption of several immune modulating factors present in seminal fluid.

== Risks ==
It is commonly hypothesized that nipple and genital stimulation may lead to oxytocin release, and thus uterine contractions. It is also hypothesized that both mechanical stimulation of the cervix and semen may induce cervical ripening by prostaglandins. Both are suggested to lead to labor induction. However, there is no evidence of sexual activity being correlated with preterm births in low-risk populations and in those who has previously had a pre-term delivery. There is however an association in those with Mycoplasma hominis or Trichomonas vaginalis colonization. In general, those at risk of pre-term birth are advised to avoid intercourse even though there is no evidence for any benefit from this avoidance. Sexual intercourse is also not effective for labor induction at or beyond term.

Although the mucus plug helps reduce risks of pelvic inflammatory disease (PID), it does not fully prevent it. Physicians should not rule out a possibility of PID when a pregnant person presents with abdominal pain.

Those with placenta previa are generally advised to avoid intercourse due to fear of antepartum hemorrhage triggered by penile contact with cervix. However, this appears to be physically impossible due to the angle of the cervix.

Venous air embolism, a dangerous condition in which air enters and clogs the veins, have been very rarely reported (22 cases as of 2011) in pregnancy in connection with orogenital and penile–vaginal sex. The distended uteroplacental vasculature can potentially allow the influx of air if there is a source of pressure pushing air in. As a result, orogenital sex in which the partner blows into the vagina should be avoided.

== After pregnancy ==
Sexual intercourse after giving birth can begin when the couple is both ready. However, most American couples wait six weeks. Ovulation and thus pregnancy can begin before a return to regular menses.

== See also ==
- Pregnancy fetishism
