= Environment and sexual orientation =

Field of sexual orientation research

The relationship between the environment and sexual orientation is a subject of research. In the study of sexual orientation, some researchers distinguish environmental influences from hormonal influences, while other researchers include biological influences such as prenatal hormones as part of environmental influences.

Scientists do not know the exact cause of sexual orientation, but they theorize that it is the result of a complex interplay of genetic, hormonal, and environmental influences. They do not view sexual orientation as a choice.

Evidence for the impact of the post-natal social environment on sexual orientation is weak, especially for males. There is no substantial evidence which suggests parenting or early childhood experiences influence sexual orientation, but research has linked childhood gender nonconformity and homosexuality.

== Sexual orientation compared with sexual orientation identity ==
Often, sexual orientation and sexual orientation identity are not distinguished, which can impact accurately assessing sexual identity and whether or not sexual orientation is able to change; sexual orientation identity can change throughout an individual's life, and may or may not align with biological sex, sexual behavior or actual sexual orientation. Sexual orientation is stable and unlikely to change for the vast majority of people, but some research indicates that some people may experience change in their sexual orientation, and this is more likely for women than for men. The American Psychological Association distinguishes between sexual orientation (an enduring attraction) and sexual orientation identity (which may change at any point in a person's life). Scientists and mental health professionals generally do not believe that sexual orientation is a choice.

The American Psychological Association states that "sexual orientation is not a choice that can be changed at will, and that sexual orientation is most likely the result of a complex interaction of environmental, cognitive and biological factors...is shaped at an early age...[and evidence suggests] biological, including genetic or inborn hormonal factors, play a significant role in a person's sexuality". They say that "sexual orientation identity—not sexual orientation—appears to change via psychotherapy, support groups, and life events". The American Psychiatric Association says that individuals may "become aware at different points in their lives that they are heterosexual, gay, lesbian, or bisexual" and "opposes any psychiatric treatment, such as 'reparative' or 'conversion' therapy, which is based upon the assumption that homosexuality per se is a mental disorder, or based upon a prior assumption that the patient should change his/her homosexual orientation". They do, however, encourage gay affirmative psychotherapy.

== Prenatal environment ==
The influence of hormones on the developing fetus has been the most influential causal hypothesis of the development of sexual orientation. In simple terms, the developing fetal brain begins in a "female" typical state. The presence of the Y-chromosome in males prompts the development of testes, which release testosterone, the primary androgen receptor-activating hormone, to masculinize the fetal brain. This masculinizing effect pushes males towards male typical brain structures, and most of the time, attraction to females. It has been hypothesized that gay men may have been exposed to lower levels of testosterone in key regions of the brain, or had different levels of receptivity to its masculinizing effects, or experienced fluctuations at critical times. In women, it is hypothesized that high levels of exposure to testosterone in key regions may increase likelihood of same sex attraction.

Supporting this are studies of the finger digit ratio of the right hand, a supposed marker of prenatal testosterone exposure (however subsequent research has been critical of using digit ratios as a marker). Lesbians on average were found to have significantly more masculine digit ratios, a finding which has been replicated numerous times in studies cross-culturally, but sometimes contradicted, such as when ethnicity is taken into account. While direct effects are hard to measure for ethical reasons, animal experiments where scientists manipulate exposure to sex hormones during gestation can also induce life long male-typical behavior and mounting in female animals, and female-typical behavior in male animals.

Maternal immune responses during fetal development are strongly demonstrated as causing male homosexuality and bisexuality. Research since the 1990s has demonstrated that the more male sons a woman has, there is a higher chance of later born sons being gay. During pregnancy, male cells enter a mother's bloodstream, which are foreign to her immune system. In response, she develops antibodies to neutralize them. These antibodies are then released on future male fetuses and may neutralize Y-linked antigens, which play a role in brain masculinization, leaving areas of the brain responsible for sexual attraction in the female-typical position, or attracted to men. The more sons a mother has will increase the levels of these antibodies, thus creating the observed fraternal birth order effect. Biochemical evidence to support this effect was confirmed in a lab study in 2017, finding that mothers with a gay son, particularly those with older brothers, had heightened levels of antibodies to the NLGN4Y Y-protein than mothers with heterosexual sons. J. Michael Bailey has described maternal immune responses as "causal" of male homosexuality. This effect is estimated to account for between 15-29% of gay men, while other gay and bisexual men are thought to owe sexual orientation to genetic and hormonal interactions.

Socialization theories, which were dominant in the 1900s, favored the idea that children were born "undifferentiated" and were socialized into gender roles and sexual orientation. This led to medical experiments in which newborn and infant boys were surgically reassigned into girls after accidents such as botched circumcisions. These males were then reared and raised as females without telling the boys, which, contrary to expectations, did not make them feminine nor attracted to men. All published cases providing sexual orientation grew up to be strongly attracted to women. The failure of these experiments demonstrate that socialization effects does not induce feminine type behavior in males, nor make them attracted to men, and that the organizational effects of hormones on the fetal brain prior to birth have permanent effects. These are indicative of 'nature', not nurture, at least with regards to male sexual orientation.

Raw data
Average volumes of INAH3 in straight and gay men and in women.

The sexually dimorphic nucleus of the preoptic area (SDN-POA) is a key region of the brain which differs between males and females in humans and a number of mammals (e.g., sheep/rams, mice, rats), and is caused by sex differences in hormone exposure. The INAH-3 region is bigger in males than in females, and is thought to be a critical region in sexual behavior. Dissection studies found that gay men had smaller sized INAH-3 than heterosexual males, shifted in the female typical direction, a finding first demonstrated by neuroscientist Simon LeVay, which has been partially replicated by William Byne, who found gay men had intermediate sized INAH-3. Dissection studies are rare, however, due to lack of funding and brain samples.

Raw data
Average volumes of the equivalent cell group in sheep (oSDN) for heterosexual and homosexual rams and for ewes. Sex differences are formed under the influence of prenatal hormones in utero, rather than acquired after birth.

Long-term studies of domesticated sheep have found that 6-8% of rams have a homosexual preference through their life. Dissection of ram brains also found a similar smaller (feminized) structure in homosexually oriented rams compared to heterosexually oriented rams in the equivalent brain region to the human SDN, the ovine sexually dimorphic nucleus (oSDN). The size of the sheep oSDN has also been demonstrated to be formed in utero, rather than postnatally, underscoring the role of prenatal hormones in masculinization of the brain for sexual attraction.

Other studies in humans have relied on brain imaging technology, such as research led by Ivanka Savic which compared hemispheres of the brain. This research found that straight men had right hemispheres 2% larger than the left, described as a modest but "highly significant difference" by LeVay. In heterosexual women, the two hemispheres were the same size. In gay men, the two hemispheres were also the same size, or sex atypical, while in lesbians, the right hemispheres were slightly larger than the left, indicating a small shift in the male direction.

A model proposed by evolutionary geneticist William R. Rice argues that a misexpressed epigenetic modifier of testosterone sensitivity or insensitivity that affected development of the brain can explain homosexuality, and can best explain twin discordance. Rice et al. propose that these epimarks normally canalize sexual development, preventing intersex conditions in most of the population, but sometimes failing to erase across generations and causing reversed sexual preference. On grounds of evolutionary plausibility, Gavrilets, Friberg and Rice argue that all mechanisms for exclusive homosexual orientations likely trace back to their epigenetic model. Testing this hypothesis is possible with current stem cell technology.

There is evidence that mutations in NLGN4X and NLGN4Y are linked to autism spectrum conditions and such conditions may be elevated in asexual people. Thus, NLGN4X/Y may affect neurological functioning associated with, broadly, the forming of social connections to others, including sexual/romantic ones.

== Childhood gender nonconformity ==
Researchers have found childhood gender nonconformity (CGN) to be the largest predictor of homosexuality in adulthood. Gay men often report being feminine boys, and lesbian women often report being masculine girls. In men, CGN is a strong predictor of sexual orientation in adulthood, but this relationship is not as well understood in women. Women with congenital adrenal hyperplasia (CAH), which effects production of sex steroids, report more male typical play behaviors and show less heterosexual interest. Bailey believes childhood gender nonconformity to be a clear indicator that male homosexuality is an inborn trait – the result of hormones, genes and other prenatal developmental factors. Bailey says boys are "punished much more than rewarded" for their gender nonconformity, and that such behavior "emerges with no encouragement, and despite opposition", making it "the sine qua non of innateness". Bailey describes gender nonconforming boys as the "poster children for biological influences on gender and sexuality, and this is true whether or not we measure a single biological marker".

Daryl Bem proposed the "exotic becomes erotic" theory (EBE) in 1996. Bem argues that biological factors, such as prenatal hormones, genes and neuroanatomy, predispose children to behave in ways that do not conform to their sex assigned at birth. Gender nonconforming children will often prefer opposite-sex playmates and activities. These become alienated from their same-sex peer group. As children enter adolescence "the exotic becomes erotic" where dissimilar and unfamiliar same-sex peers produces arousal, and the general arousal become eroticized over time. Wetherell et al. state that Bem "does not intend his model as an absolute prescription for all individuals, but rather as a modal or average explanation."

Two critiques of Bem's theory in the journal Psychological Review concluded that "studies cited by Bem and additional research show that Exotic Becomes Erotic theory is not supported by scientific evidence." Bem was criticized for relying on a non-random sample of gay men from the 1970s and for drawing conclusions that appear to contradict the original data. An "examination of the original data showed virtually all respondents were familiar with children of both sexes", and that only 9% of gay men said that "none or only a few" of their friends were male, and most gay men (74%) reported having "an especially close friend of the same sex" during grade school. Further, "71% of gay men reported feeling different from other boys, but so did 38% of heterosexual men. The difference for gay men is larger, but still indicates that feeling different from same-sex peers was common for heterosexual men." Bem also acknowledged that gay men were more likely to have older brothers (the fraternal birth order effect), which appeared to contradict an unfamiliarity with males. Bem cited cross-cultural studies which also "appear to contradict the EBE theory assertion", such as the Sambia tribe in Papua New Guinea, who segregate boys from females during adolescence and ritually enforce homosexual acts among teenagers (they believe this is important for male growth potential), yet once these boys reached adulthood, only a small proportion of men continued to engage in homosexual behaviour - similar to levels observed in the United States. LeVay has said while the theory was ordered in a "believable order", the theory "lacks empirical support". Social psychologist Justin Lehmiller stated that Bem's theory has received praise "for the way it seamlessly links biological and environmental influences" and that there "is also some support for the model in the sense that childhood gender nonconformity is indeed one of the strongest predicators of adult homosexuality", but that the validity of the model "has been questioned on numerous grounds and scientists have largely rejected it."

In 2003, Lorene Gottschalk, a self-described radical feminist suggested there may be a reporting bias within the links between gender nonconformity to homosexuality in literature. Researchers have explored the possibility of bias by comparing childhood home videos with self-reports of gender nonconformity, finding that the presence of gender nonconformity was highly consistent with self-reporting, emerged early and carried into adulthood.

== Family and upbringing ==
=== General ===
Hypotheses for the impact of the post-natal social environment on sexual orientation are weak, especially for males. There is no substantial evidence which suggests parenting or early childhood experiences influence sexual orientation. Research has linked early childhood gender nonconformity and homosexuality; gay men, on average, have been observed to be significantly more feminine from early childhood while lesbians are significantly more masculine. Bisexuals also report childhood gender nonconformity, but the difference is not as large as it is for gay men and lesbians. Early gender nonconformity is suggestive evidence that non-heterosexual orientations are dependent on early biological factors (genetic influence, prenatal hormones, or other factors during fetal development), since this sex atypical behavior emerges despite no encouragement from the social environment or parents. Parents and adults may react negatively to this gender nonconformity in their children, resulting in higher rates of maltreatment. Early hypotheses presumed that childhood maltreatment experienced by some non-heterosexuals was the cause of non-heterosexual orientations, a theory which has not been supported by more thorough examination.

=== Fraternal birth order ===
External videos
- Ray Blanchard explains the fraternal birth order effect, YouTube video

Since the 1990s, a large volume of research has demonstrated that each younger biological brother from the same mother has a 28–48% greater chance of being gay. This phenomenon is known as the fraternal birth order effect. The correlation is not found in those with older adoptive or step brothers, leading scientists to attribute this to a maternal immune response to developing male fetuses, rather than a social effect. It has been estimated that between 15% and 29% of gay men owe their orientation to this effect, although this may be higher when factoring in miscarriages of male fetuses (which are unable to be factored into calculations). In 2017, biochemical evidence for the effect was found which demonstrated that mothers of sons, particularly those with gay sons, had significantly higher levels of antibodies to male NLGN4Y proteins than mothers with no sons. Biologist Jacques Balthazart said that the finding "adds a significant chapter to growing evidence indicating that sexual orientation is heavily influenced by prenatal biological mechanisms rather than by unidentified factors in socialization". The effect is an example of a non-genetic influence on male sexual orientation occurring in the prenatal environment. The effect does not mean that all or most sons will be gay after several male pregnancies, but rather, the odds of having a gay son increase from approximately 2% for the first born son, to 3% for the second, 5% for the third (and becomes stronger with each successive male fetus).

== Boys who were surgically reassigned and raised as females ==
Between the 1960s and 2000, many newborn and infant boys were surgically reassigned as females if they were born with malformed penises, or if they lost their penises in accidents. Many surgeons believed such males would be happier being socially and surgically reassigned female. In all seven published cases that have provided sexual orientation information, the subjects grew up to be strongly attracted to females. In Psychological Science in the Public Interest, six scientists including J. Michael Bailey state this establishes a strong case that male sexual orientation is partly established before birth:

This is the result we would expect if male sexual orientation were entirely due to nature, and it is opposite of the result expected if it were due to nurture, in which case we would expect that none of these individuals would be predominantly attracted to women. They show how difficult it is to derail the development of male sexual orientation by psychosocial means.

They further argue that this raises questions about the significance of the social environment on sexual orientation, stating, "If one cannot reliably make a male human become attracted to other males by cutting off his penis in infancy and rearing him as a girl, then what other psychosocial intervention could plausibly have that effect?" It is further stated that neither cloacal exstrophy (resulting in a malformed penis), nor surgical accidents, are associated with abnormalities of prenatal androgens, thus, the brains of these individuals were male-organized at birth. Six of the seven identified as heterosexual males at follow up, despite being surgically altered and reared as females, with researchers adding: "available evidence indicates that in such instances, parents are deeply committed to raising these children as girls and in as gender-typical a manner as possible." Bailey et al. describe the occurrence of these sex reassignments as "the near-perfect quasi-experiment" in measuring the impact of 'nature' versus 'nurture' with regards to male homosexuality.

== Childhood sexual abuse, molestation or early experiences ==
The hypothesis that sexual abuse, molestation or early sexual experience, causes homosexuality has been a subject of speculation but does not have scientific support. Instead, research has demonstrated that non-heterosexuals, especially men, are more likely to be targeted for childhood sexual abuse due to their gender nonconforming behavior, which is visible from a young age and is a strong predictor of adult homosexuality. As this gender nonconformity often makes them identifiable, they may be especially susceptible to same-sex experiences even at young ages as they may be recognized by older opportunistic individuals, or they may be victimized by others who dislike gender nonconformity. Childhood sexual abuse often includes a variety of different experiences typically before age 18, not simply early childhood. Gay males are more likely to engage in age discrepant relationships during teenage years due to hiding their sexual orientation and a lack of available partners, which may be qualified as sexual abuse, but is not evidence of a "cause" of their sexual orientation.

Cross-cultural evidence also speaks against the notion that a first sex encounter influences a person's ultimate sexual orientation. Among the Sambia of New Guinea, beginning between age 7 and 10, all boys are required to engage in ritual sexual contacts with older male youths for several years before they have any access to females, yet the vast majority of these boys become heterosexual men, while only a small number of males have homosexual orientations, at a similar level as found in Western cultures.

Additionally, long term studies of British students who attended single-sex boarding schools, where early homosexual behavior occurs at elevated rates, found that such students were no more likely to be gay in adulthood than the general population.

There is stronger support for the idea that female sexual orientation may be affected by external or social influences. However, there are numerous other confounders that that prevent any strong conclusions being made. These include personality traits such as one's level of agreeableness or propensity to risk taking, which have been found to be heightened in studies of lesbians; this may make them more susceptible to being abused. A 2016 review authored by six experts in the fields of genetics, psychology, biology, neuroscience and endocrinology concluded that they favored biological theories for explaining sexual orientation, and that, compared to males, "it would also be less surprising to us (and to others) to discover that social environment affects female sexual orientation and related behavior", but "that possibility must be scientifically supported rather than assumed".

A 2013 study "Does Childhood Maltreatment Effect Sexual Orientation?" by Roberts et al. reported that sexual abuse may affect men and not women. According to neuroscientist Simon LeVay, a controversy arose because the conclusion relied on an unusual statistical technique and it is argued she did not apply this correctly. A critique by J. Michael Bailey and Drew Bailey states that "Not only do Roberts et al.'s results fail to provide support for the idea that childhood maltreatment causes adult homosexuality, the pattern of differences between males and females is opposite what should be expected based on better evidence." Bailey states that Robert's instrumental regression and analysis were "almost certainly violated" by the confounding factor of genes shared between parents and children. When controlling for genetic confounders, the link between sexual abuse and adult non-heterosexuality in men can be reduced to zero. Bailey concludes that Roberts' conclusion poorly fits the experience of gay men, who usually experience same-sex attraction long before their first sexual experience, that there is "compelling evidence that male sexual orientation is fixed early in development, probably before birth and certainly before childhood adversity could plausibly affect it", and that "previous research is inconsistent with the hypothesis that childhood experiences play a significant causal role in adult sexual orientation, especially in men".

In 2016, LeVay reported that another research group found evidence "supporting the original idea" that an increased rate of childhood sexual abuse among gay men is entirely due to being targeted for their childhood gender-nonconformist behaviour. This research found that gay, bisexual, and straight men who were gender nonconforming in childhood were equally as likely to report experiencing childhood sexual abuse, while gay, bi and straight men who were typically masculine in childhood were significantly less likely to report experiencing sexual abuse. Additionally, significant numbers of heterosexuals experience childhood sexual abuse, and yet grew up to be heterosexual. LeVay concludes that "the weight of the evidence does not support the notion that childhood abuse is a causal factor in the development of homosexuality".

Other confounding factors also distort research, including heterosexuals underreporting abuse, which is a particularly common issue among heterosexual men, while non-heterosexuals may be more likely to be honest about having experienced abuse in coming to terms with their same-sex attraction. Sexual minorities can also be victims of corrective rape (or homophobic rape), a hate crime in which someone is sexually assaulted because of their perceived sexual orientation or gender identity. The common intended consequence of the rape, as seen by the perpetrator, is to turn the victim heterosexual or to enforce conformity with gender stereotypes. Additionally, studies relying on convenience samples can result in higher rates of abuse, which have limited validity describing rates of abuse in the wider population.

Childhood sexual abuse, when defined as "sexual experiences with an adult or any other person younger than 18 years when the individual did not want the sexual experience or was too young to know what was happening", is combining a number of different experiences, likely to have different causes and effects. This may include sexual experiences of children too young to have understood what was happening, and the sexual experiences of late adolescents who understood those experiences but did not want them, as well as abusive experiences with the same sex and with the other sex.

The American Psychiatric Association states: "...no specific psychosocial or family dynamic cause for homosexuality has been identified, including histories of childhood sexual abuse". Scientists in sexual orientation research favour biological theories, for which evidence has been building after a long-term failure to demonstrate the influence of the postnatal social environment on sexual orientation, and this is especially so for males.

== Chemical disruptors ==
Environmental compounds such as plastic softeners (phthalate esters), which are pervasive environmental chemicals with anti-androgenic effects may interfere with sexual differentiation of the human brain during prenatal development. Researchers are investigating exposure to these endocrine disruptors during pregnancy and later sexual orientation of offspring, although scientists caution that no conclusions can be made yet. Historical records indicate homosexual people were present and recognized in many times, cultures and places prior to industrialisation.

Between 1939 and 1960, around two million expectant mothers in the United States and Europe were prescribed a synthetic estrogen known as diethylstilbestrol (DES) in the belief that it would prevent miscarriages. DES did not prevent miscarriage, but it reportedly increased the likelihood of bisexuality and homosexuality in the daughters of women given the drug.

== Other ==
Data scientist Seth Stephens-Davidowitz reported that the actual prevalence of gay men does not appear to vary between states in the U.S. because the percentage of Internet porn searches that are for gay male porn are nearly the same in all states, about 5%. On this basis he believes migration of gay men to cities is overstated, and says that in states where there is a social stigma against homosexuality so that "many more gay men are in the closet than are out".

== See also ==
- Biology and sexual orientation
- Demographics of sexual orientation
- Homosexuality and psychology
- Nature versus nurture
- Sexual fluidity
- Xenoestrogen
