= Human male sexuality =

Feelings and behaviors

Human male sexuality encompasses a wide variety of feelings and behaviors. Men's feelings of attraction may be caused by various physical and social traits of their potential partner. Men's sexual behavior can be affected by many factors, including evolved predispositions, individual personality, upbringing, and culture. While most men are heterosexual, and attracted only to women, there are significant minorities of homosexual men and varying degrees of bisexual men. Homosexual males are more common than homosexual females.

== Sexual attraction ==
=== Physical factors ===
Research indicates that men tend to be attracted to young women with bodily symmetry. Facial symmetry, femininity, and averageness are also linked with attractiveness. Men typically find female breasts attractive and this holds true for a variety of cultures. The pigmentation of nipples and breasts appears to be the most important quality of breast attractiveness. Men rated women with dark nipples and dark areola as significantly more attractive than those with light-colored nipples or areola. Breasts of medium cup size were found to be the most attractive, however authors noted that men focused primarily on the coloration of nipples and areola rather than breast size.

One study found a historical preference for lighter-skinned women. However, the accuracy of this research has been questioned by more recent research, which found a preference for women with darker skin tones. Experimental studies show that White men are more attracted to women with tanned and light-brown skin, rather than pale women. Women in the West believe that men are more attracted to women with tan skin, which likely explains why women are much more likely to tan than men, according to a 2017 study. There is a direct correlation between being tan and self-perceived attractiveness among young women.

Skin color contrast has been linked to male sexual preferences across many cultures. Women tend to have darker eyes and lips than men, especially relative to the rest of their facial features, and this attribute has been associated with female attractiveness and femininity, yet it also decreases male attractiveness according to one study. Women may use cosmetics such as lipstick and eye shadow to increase their facial color contrast, or to increase the apparent distance between their eyes and eyebrows. A 2009 study found that East Asian people had more facial skin contrast than White people, owing to their consistently darker eyes.

A comparison of a desirable waist-to-hip ratio (0.7) and an undesirable waist-to-hip ratio (0.9)

Women with a relatively low waist-to-hip ratio (WHR) are considered more attractive. The exact ratio varies among cultures, depending on the WHR of the women in the local culture. In Western cultures, a WHR of 0.70 is preferred.

Other physical factors of attraction include full lips, facial femininity, long, lustrous hair, low body mass index, and low waist circumference. Preference for a slim or a plump body build is culturally variable, but in a predictable manner. In cultures where food is scarce, plumpness is associated with higher status and is more attractive, but the reverse is true in wealthy cultures.

Men generally prefer their wives to be younger than they are, but by how much exactly varies between cultures. Older men prefer greater age differences, while teenage males prefer females slightly older than they are.

The exact degree to which physical appearance is considered important in selecting a long-term mate varies between cultures.

=== Non-physical factors ===
When choosing long-term partners, both men and women desire those who are intelligent, kind, understanding, and healthy. They also show a preference for partners who have similar values, attitudes, personality, and religious beliefs.

The importance of premarital chastity varies a great deal according to culture, as well as the religious beliefs and sexual orientation of the individual. In Western culture, the importance and value of chastity has generally declined among heterosexual individuals. Among 18 different attributes, chastity was rated 10th most valuable in 1939, but only 17th most valuable in 1990.

== Sexual behavior ==
Many factors influence men's sexual behavior. These include evolved tendencies, such as a greater interest in casual sex, as well as individual and social factors related to upbringing, personality, and relationship status.

=== Interest in casual sex ===
Compared to women, men have a greater interest in casual sex. On average, men express a greater desire for a variety of sex partners, let less time elapse before seeking sex, lower their standards dramatically when pursuing short-term mating, have more sexual fantasies and more fantasies involving a variety of sex partners, report having a higher sex drive, find cues to sexual exploitability to be attractive for short-term mating, experience more sexual regret over missed sexual opportunities, have a larger number of extramarital affairs and are more likely to seek hookups and friends with benefits, and visit prostitutes more often. This has been often attributed to safety and social concerns when it comes to casual sex for women, and differences disappear when risk is accounted for and pleasure is guaranteed.

=== Upbringing and personality ===
One study has several factors that influence the age of first sexual intercourse among youth aged 13–18. Those from families with both parents present, from high socioeconomic backgrounds, who performed better at school, were more religious, who had higher parental expectations, and felt like their parents care, showed much lower levels of sexual activity across all age groups in the study. In contrast, those with higher levels of body pride showed higher levels of sexual activity.

=== Sociosexuality ===
Males who are in a committed relationship have a restricted sociosexual orientation, and will have different sexual behavior compared to males who have an unrestricted sociosexual orientation. Males with a restricted sociosexual orientation will be less willing to have sex outside of their committed relationship and behave according to their desire for commitment and emotional closeness with their partner.

Sociosexually restricted males are less likely to approach females who have lower waist-to-hip ratios (0.68–0.72), generally rated as more physically attractive.

=== Expected parental investment ===
Elizabeth Cashdan proposed that mate strategies among both genders differ depending on how much parental investment is expected of the male, and provided research support for her hypotheses. When men expect to provide a high level of parental investment, they will attempt to attract women by emphasising their ability to invest. In addition, men who expect to invest will be more likely to highlight their chastity and fidelity than men who expect not to invest. Men with the expectation of low parental investment will flaunt their sexuality to women. Cashdan argues the fact the research supports the idea that men expecting to invest emphasise their chastity and fidelity, which is a high-cost strategy (because it lowers reproductive opportunities), suggests that that type of behaviour must be beneficial, or the behaviour would not have been selected.

=== Paternity certainty ===
Paternity certainty is the extent to which a male knows or believes that a woman's child is his.

In polygamous societies, men feel greater sexual jealousy when there is low paternity certainty. This is because they do not want to risk wasting time, energy and resources on a child that is not theirs.

Socio-economic differences between cultures also affect paternity certainty. In a "natural fertility" country such as Namibia, 96% of males show sexual jealousy.

Additionally, there is a greater likelihood of paternity loss and paternity uncertainty when there is a lack of contraceptives.

=== Sexual violence ===
Far more men than women commit rape. It may be that rape is a non-adaptive by-product of other evolved mechanisms, such as desire for sexual variety and for sex without investment, sensitivity to sexual opportunities, and a general capacity for physical aggression. Masculine gender roles and a sense of general and sexual entitlement, which are usually endorsed in patriarchal and heteronormative societies, predict rape-related attitudes and behaviors in men. However, it could be that evolutionary selection in the ancestral environment in some cases favored males who raped, resulting in rape itself being an adaptation. Scholars from several fields have criticized this idea. David Buss states that clear-cut evidence either way is lacking.

== Homosexuality ==
Gay man flag

=== Sexual orientation and sexual identity ===
Sexual orientation refers to one's relative attraction to men, to women, or to both. Most researchers studying sexual orientation focus on patterns of attraction rather than behavior or identity, because culture affects the expression of behavior or identity and it is attraction that motivates behavior and identity, not the other way around.

Aside from being heterosexual or homosexual, individuals can be any of varying degrees of bisexual. Bailey et al. stated that they expect that in all cultures the vast majority of people are sexually predisposed exclusively to the other sex, with a minority being sexually predisposed to the same sex, whether exclusively or not. In Western surveys, about 93% of men identify as completely heterosexual, 4% as mostly heterosexual, 0.5% as more evenly bisexual, 0.5% as mostly homosexual, and 2% as completely homosexual. An analysis of 67 studies found that the lifetime prevalence of sex between men (regardless of orientation) was 3–5% for East Asia, 6–12% for South and South East Asia, 6–15% for Eastern Europe, and 6–20% for Latin America. The World Health Organization estimates a worldwide prevalence of men who have sex with men between 3 and 16%.

Sexual orientation can be measured via self-report or physiologically. Multiple physiological methods exist, including measurement of penile erection, viewing time, FMRI, and pupil dilation. In men, these all show a high degree of correlation with self-report measures, including men who self report as "mostly straight" or "mostly gay".

What impact same-sex sexuality has upon one's social identity varies across cultures. The question of precisely how cultures through history conceptualized homosexual desire and behavior is a matter of some debate.

In much of the modern world, sexual identity is defined based on the sex of one's partner. In some parts of the world, however, sexuality is often socially defined based on sexual roles, whether one is a penetrator ("top") or is penetrated ("bottom").

=== Causes ===
Although no causal theory has yet gained widespread support, there is considerably more evidence supporting nonsocial causes of sexual orientation than social ones, especially for males. This evidence includes the cross-cultural correlation of homosexuality and childhood gender nonconformity, moderate genetic influences found in twin studies, evidence for prenatal hormonal effects on brain organization, the fraternal birth order effect, and the finding that in rare cases where infant males were raised as girls due to physical deformity, they nevertheless turned out attracted to females. Hypothesized social causes are supported by only weak evidence, distorted by numerous confounding factors. Cross-cultural evidence also leans more toward non-social causes. Cultures that are very tolerant of homosexuality do not have significantly higher rates of it. Homosexual behavior is relatively common among boys in British single-sex boarding schools, but adult Britons who attended such schools are no more likely to engage in homosexual behavior than those who did not. In an extreme case, the Sambia ritually require their boys to engage in homosexual behavior during adolescence before they have any access to females, yet most of these boys become heterosexual.

It is not fully understood why the genes for homosexuality, or allowing it to develop, whatever they may be, persist in the gene pool. One hypothesis involves kin selection, suggesting that homosexuals invest heavily enough in their relatives to offset the cost of not reproducing as much directly. This has not been supported by studies in Western cultures, but several studies in Samoa have found some support for this hypothesis. Another hypothesis involves sexually antagonistic genes, which cause homosexuality when expressed in males but increase reproduction when expressed in females. Studies in both Western and non-Western cultures have found support for this hypothesis.

It has been hypothesized that homosexual behavior may itself be an adaptation for same-sex affiliation or alliance formation, though this disposition would vary genetically among individuals and occur more often when competition for female partners is especially severe. Evolutionary psychologist David Buss criticized this hypothesis, stating that there is no evidence that most young men in most cultures use homoerotic behavior to establish alliances; instead, the norm is for same-sex alliances to not be accompanied by any sexual activity. Additionally, he states that there is no evidence that men who engage in homoerotic behavior do better than other men at forming alliances or ascending in status. Other researchers have also criticized it, commenting that the cross-cultural data on sexual practices are sketchy and uneven; that there is no need to assume that homosexual behavior, more than any other sexual behavior, is under direct selection rather than being a neutral byproduct; that the hypothesis ignores the existence of sexual orientation; that it contradicts findings that behaviorally homosexual or bisexual men have much lower rates of fatherhood; that primate homosexual behavior is not a uniform phenomenon and varies within and across species; and that since same-sex sexual partners are chosen on the basis of sexual emotion (in contrast to bonobos, for example), alliances of this kind would only occur as often as mutual sexual attraction, and such variability would seem to indicate a lack of design by natural selection.

== See also ==
- Androphilia and gynephilia
- Artificial vagina
- Cock ring
- Erectile dysfunction
- Erogenous zone § Male
- Glory hole
- Human sexuality
  - Human female sexuality
- Male appearance:
  - Bear
  - Beefcake
  - Bishōnen
  - Dandy
  - Kkonminam
  - Lad mag
  - Lumbersexual
  - Metrosexual
- Male dominance (BDSM)
- Male prostitution
- Male reproductive system
- Male submission
- Masculinity
- Men who have sex with men
  - Down-low
  - HIV and men who have sex with men
  - Sexual practices between men
- Sex doll
- Orgasm § Males
- Prostate massage
- P-spot vibrator
- Playboy lifestyle
- Promiscuity § Male promiscuity
- Sexual arousal § Male physiological response
