= Daryl Bem =

American psychologist (born 1938)

Daryl J. Bem
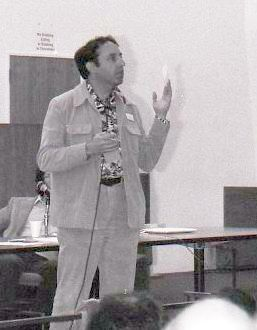
- Bem at a conference in 1983.
- Born: June 10, 1938 (age 88)
- Education: University of Michigan
- Occupations: Social psychologist, parapsychologist
- Known for: Self-perception theory
- Website: dbem.org

Daryl J. Bem (born June 10, 1938) is an American social psychologist and professor emeritus at Cornell University. He is the originator of the self-perception theory of attitude formation and change. He has also researched psi phenomena, group decision making, handwriting analysis, sexual orientation, and personality theory and assessment.

== Early life and education ==
Dayl Bem grew up in a Jewish family in Denver, Colorado. As a teenager, he performed mentalism. He received a BA in physics from Reed College in Portland, Oregon in 1960 and began graduate work in physics at the Massachusetts Institute of Technology. The civil rights movement had just begun, and he became so intrigued with the changing attitudes toward desegregation in the American South that he decided to switch fields and pursue a career as a social psychologist specializing in attitudes and public opinion. He obtained his PhD in social psychology from the University of Michigan in 1964.

== Career ==
Bem taught at Carnegie Mellon University, Stanford, Harvard, and Cornell University. He started at Cornell in 1978 and retired in 2007, becoming a professor emeritus.

Bem testified before a subcommittee of the United States Senate on the psychological effects of police interrogation and served as an expert witness in court cases involving sex discrimination.

=== Self-perception theory ===
In 1972, Bem proposed the self-perception theory of attitude change, which proposes a different mechanism of change than that of Leon Festinger's cognitive dissonance theory. The two theories appear contradictory. Dissonance theory explains how people change their attitudes when they find themselves acting in opposition to the attitudes they already hold, while self-perception theory explains how people create their attitudes in the first place.

According to self-perception theory, people infer their attitudes from their own behavior much as an outside observer might. For example, just as a person might watch someone else giving a pro-Fidel Castro speech and infer that the person is in favor of Castro, a person who is asked to give such a speech would consequently come to view themself as more in favor of Castro.

In 1970, Bem and Keith McConnell demonstrated that people are often unaware of attitude changes caused by their behavior. Instead, people believe that the views they currently hold are the views that they have always held. Bem and McConnell demonstrated this by measuring the change in Carnegie Mellon students' attitudes toward having control of their university curriculum. After an initial measurement of student attitudes, which were favorable toward student control, Bem and McConnel assigned students to write an essay opposing student control. By writing an essay proclaiming views different from the ones they held, students' views changed to become less favorable toward student control. When Bem and McConnell asked the students how they had felt at the beginning of the study, students insisted that they had always felt less favorable toward student control. The students believed that the experiment had not changed their opinions, even though it had changed their opinions significantly.

=== Exotic becomes erotic theory ===
Bem's exotic becomes erotic theory (EBE) presents one possible explanation as to what differentiates the etiology of homosexuality from heterosexuality. Bem theorized that the influence of biological factors on sexual orientation may be mediated by experiences in childhood, that the child's temperament predisposes the child to prefer certain activities over others. Bem noted that because of their temperament, which is influenced by biological variables such as genetic factors, some children will be attracted to activities that are commonly enjoyed by other children of the same gender, while others will prefer activities that are typical of the other gender. Bem theorized that this makes a gender-conforming child feel different from opposite-gender children, while gender-nonconforming children will feel different from children of their own gender. He believes that this feeling of difference evokes physiological arousal when the child is near members of the gender which the child considers as being "different". Bem theorizes that this physiological arousal is later transformed into sexual arousal: that is, as adults, people become sexually attracted to the gender which they came to see as different, or "exotic", while they were children.

Bem based this theory in part on the finding that a majority of gay men and lesbians report being gender-nonconforming during their childhood years. A meta-analysis of 48 studies showed childhood gender nonconformity to be the strongest predictor of a homosexual orientation for both men and women. Bem also noted that in a study by the Kinsey Institute of approximately 1000 gay men and lesbians (and a control group of 500 heterosexual men and women), 63% of both gay men and lesbians reported that they did not like activities typical of their sex in childhood, compared with only 10–15% of heterosexual men and women. Bem also drew from six prospective studies, longitudinal studies that began with gender-nonconforming boys around age 7 and followed them into adolescence and adulthood; a majority (63%) of the gender nonconforming boys become gay or bisexual as adults.

Two criticisms of Bem's theory in the journal Psychological Review concluded that "studies cited by Bem and additional research show that Exotic Becomes Erotic theory is not supported by scientific evidence." Bem was criticized for relying on a non-random sample of gay men from the 1970s (rather than collecting new data) and for drawing conclusions that appear to contradict the original data. An "examination of the original data showed virtually all respondents were familiar with children of both sexes", and that only 9% of gay men said that "none or only a few" of their friends were male, and most gay men (74%) reported having "an especially close friend of the same sex" during grade school. Further, "71% of gay men reported feeling different from other boys, but so did 38% of heterosexual men. The difference for gay men is larger, but still indicates that feeling different from same-sex peers was common for heterosexual men." Bem also acknowledged that gay men were more likely to have older brothers (the fraternal birth order effect), which appeared to contradict an unfamiliarity with males. Bem cited cross-cultural studies which also "appear to contradict the EBE theory assertion", such as the Sambia tribe in Papua New Guinea, which ritually enforced homosexual acts among teenagers, yet once these boys reached adulthood, only a small proportion of men continued to engage in homosexual behaviour - similar to levels observed in the United States. Additionally, Bem's model could be interpreted as implying that if one could change a child's behavior, one could change their sexual orientation, but most psychologists doubt this would be possible.

Neuroscientist Simon LeVay has said that while the theory was arranged in a "believable temporal order", that it ultimately "lacks empirical support". Social psychologist Justin LehMiller stated that "Bem's theory has received a lot of praise for the way it seamlessly links biological and environmental influences" and that there "is also some support for the model in the sense that childhood gender nonconformity is indeed one of the strongest predicators of adult homosexuality", but that the validity of the model "has been questioned on numerous grounds and scientists have largely rejected it."

=== Ganzfeld experiment ===
In parapsychology, Bem is known for his defense of the ganzfeld experiment as evidence of psi, more commonly known as extrasensory perception or psychic phenomena.

Bem and Charles Honorton (1994) reviewed the experimental arrangements of the autoganzfeld experiments, and concluded they provided excellent security against deception by subjects and sensory cues. However, Ray Hyman disagreed with Bem and Honorton as he claims to have discovered some interesting patterns in the data that implied visual cues may have taken place in the experiments. Hyman wrote that the autoganzfeld experiments were flawed because they did not preclude the possibility of sensory leakage. Bem and Honorton's review was criticized by the scientific community as it contained errors. Julie Milton and Richard Wiseman (1999) who discovered errors in Bem's research carried out a meta-analysis of ganzfeld experiments in other laboratories. They found no psi effect, the results showed no effect greater than chance from a database of 30 experiments and a non-significant Stouffer Z of 0.70.

Psychologist Susan Blackmore also criticized Bem's review of the Ganzfeld literature, noting that of the nine studies that were used for the review, five came from one laboratory (Chuck Honorton's). Blackmore also noted that Bem included experiments from Carl Sargent in the review, and Blackmore had previously found that Sargent had "deliberately violated his own protocols and in one trial had almost certainly cheated." According to Blackmore, psychologists reading Bem's review in Psychological Bulletin would "not have a clue that serious doubt had been cast on more than a quarter of the studies involved". Blackmore recounts having a discussion with Bem at a consciousness conference where she challenged him on his support of Sargent and Honorton's research; he replied "it did not matter". Writing for Skeptical Inquirer Blackmore states "But it does matter. ... It matters because Bem's continued claims mislead a willing public into believing that there is reputable scientific evidence for ESP in the Ganzfeld when there is not".

=== "Feeling the Future" controversy ===
In 2011, Bem published the article "Feeling the Future: Experimental Evidence for Anomalous Retroactive Influences on Cognition and Affect" in the Journal of Personality and Social Psychology that offered statistical evidence for psi. The article's findings challenged modern scientific conceptions about the unidirectional nature of time. Its presentation by a respected researcher, and its publication by an upper-tier journal, engendered much controversy. In addition to criticism of the paper itself, the paper's publication prompted a wider debate on the validity of peer review process for allowing such a paper to be published. Bem appeared on MSNBC and The Colbert Report to discuss the experiment. American author and researcher Mitch Horowitz has noted that Bem's experiments in precognition and retrocausality, which have been validated in a meta-analysis of 90 trials in 33 labs in 14 nations, comport not only with relativity but also with interpretations of quantum physics.

Wagenmakers et al. criticized Bem's statistical methodology, saying that he incorrectly provides one-sided p-value when he should have used a two-sided p-value. This could account for the marginally-significant results of his experiment. Bem and two statisticians subsequently published a rebuttal to this critique in the Journal of Personality and Social Psychology.

Jeffrey Rouder and Richard Morey, who applied a meta-analytical Bayes factor to Bem's data, concluded, "We remain unconvinced of the viability of ESP. There is no plausible mechanism for it, and it seems contradicted by well-substantiated theories in both physics and biology. Against this background, a change in odds of 40 is negligible.

After evaluating Bem's nine experiments, psychologist James Alcock said that he found metaphorical "dirty test tubes," or serious methodological flaws, such as changing the procedures partway through the experiments and combining results of tests with different chances of significance. It is unknown how many tests were actually performed, nor is there an explanation of how it was determined that participants had "settled down" after seeing erotic images. Alcock concludes that "Just about everything that could be done wrong in an experiment occurred here". Bem's response to Alcock's critique appeared online at the Skeptical Inquirer website, and Alcock replied to these comments in a third article at the same website.

One of the nine experiments in Bem's study ("Retroactive Facilitation of Recall") was repeated by scientists Stuart J. Ritchie, Chris French, and Richard Wiseman. Their attempt to replicate was published in PLoS ONE and found no evidence of precognition. Several failed attempts by the authors to publish their replication attempt highlighted difficulties in publishing replications, attracting media attention over concerns of publication bias. The Journal of Personality and Social Psychology, Science Brevia and Psychological Science each rejected the paper on the grounds that it was a replication. A fourth journal, the British Journal of Psychology, refused the paper after reservations from one referee, later confirmed to be Bem himself, who "might possibly have a conflict of interest with respect to [the] ... submission." Wiseman set up a register to keep track of other replicating efforts to avoid problems with publication bias, and planned to conduct a meta-analysis on registered replication efforts.

In 2012, two independent articles found that the number of rejections of the null hypothesis reported by Bem (nine out of ten tested) is abnormally high, given the properties of the experiments and reported effect sizes (Francis, 2012; Schimmack, 2012). Schimmack (2015) used a more powerful test to reveal selection for significance, the Test of Insufficient Variance, and found even stronger evidence that the reported studies are biased in favor of supporting ESP. These findings imply that studies with non-significant results are missing and the reported evidence overstates the strength of the effect and evidence. According to Francis, this suggests that Bem's experiments cannot be taken as a proper scientific study, as critical data is likely unavailable.

The publication of Bem's article and the resulting controversy prompted a wide-ranging commentary by Etienne LeBel and Kurt Peters. Using Bem's article as a case study, they discussed deficiencies in the accepted methodology most commonly used in experimental psychology. LeBel and Peters suggest that experimental psychology is systemically biased toward interpretations of data that favor the researcher's theory.

In 2012, the same journal that published Bem's original experiments, The Journal of Personality and Social Psychology (Vol. 103, No. 6), published "Correcting the Past: Failures to Replicate Psi" by Jeff Galak of Carnegie Mellon University, Robyn A. LeBoeuf of the University of Florida, Leif D. Nelson of the University of California at Berkeley, and Joseph P. Simmons of the University of Pennsylvania. The paper reported seven experiments testing for precognition that "found no evidence supporting its existence."

In a 2017 follow-up article in Slate magazine on the "Feeling the Future" experiments, Bem is quoted as saying, "I'm all for rigor, but I prefer other people do it. I see its importance—it's fun for some people—but I don't have the patience for it." The article continues: "It's been hard for him, he said, to move into a field where the data count for so much. "If you looked at all my past experiments, they were always rhetorical devices. I gathered data to show how my point would be made. I used data as a point of persuasion, and I never really worried about, 'Will this replicate or will this not?'"" While fellow psychologist Stuart Vyse sees this statement as coming "remarkably close to an outright admission of p-hacking", he also notes that Bem "has been given substantial credit for stimulating the movement to tighten the standards for research" such as that taking place in open science.

A large-scale pre-registered replication in 2023, which included Bem and other ESP proponents in its design, found no evidence for precognition.

== Family life ==
Bem married Sandra Bem (née Lipsitz), also a psychology professor, in 1965. Though still legally married, they were "amicably separated" from 1994 until her death in 2014. In 2015, he married his partner of twenty years, Ithaca College professor of communication studies, performance studies, and queer studies Bruce Henderson. They live in Ithaca, NY.

== Selected publications ==
- Bem, D. J. (1972). Self-Perception Theory. In L. Berkowitz (Ed.), Advances in Experimental Social Psychology (Vol. 6, pp. 1–62). New York: Academic Press, ISBN 978-0-12-015206-3
- Bem, D. J. (1970). Beliefs, Attitudes, and Human Affairs - Wadsworth Pub Co, ISBN 978-0-8185-8906-5
- R. L. Atkinson, R. C. Atkinson, E. E. Smith, D. J. Bem. Introduction to Psychology 1990 - Harcourt Brace Jovanovich
- Bem, D. J. An experimental analysis of self-persuasion. Attitude change: the competing views, 1971
- A. Caspi, G. H. Elder, D. J. Bem. Moving against the world: Life-course patterns of explosive children. Developmental Psychology, 1987
- A. Caspi, G. H. Elder, D. J. Bem. Moving away from the world: Life-course patterns of shy children. Developmental Psychology, 1988
- Bem, D. J.; Honorton, Charles (1994). "Does psi exist? Replicable evidence for an anomalous process of information transfer". Psychological Bulletin.
- D. J. Bem, H. K. McConnell. Testing the self-perception explanation of dissonance phenomena: On the salience of premanipulation attitudes. Journal of Personality and Social Psychology, 1970
- Bem, D. J. (December 2000). "Exotic becomes erotic: interpreting the biological correlates of sexual orientation". Arch Sex Behav. 29 (6): 531–48. doi:10.1023/A:1002050303320. PMID 11100261. S2CID 12078658.
- Bem, D. J. (April 1998). "Is EBE theory supported by the evidence? Is it androcentric? A reply to Peplau et al. (1998)". Psychol Rev. 105 (2): 395–8. doi:10.1037/0033-295X.105.2.395. PMID 9577244.
- Caspi, A; Bem, D. J.; Elder Jr, G. H. (June 1989). "Continuities and consequences of interactional styles across the life course". J Pers. 57 (2): 375–406. doi:10.1111/j.1467-6494.1989.tb00487.x. PMID 2769561.
- S. L. Bem, D. J. Bem Does Sex-biased Job Advertising" Aid and Abet" Sex Discrimination? Journal of Applied Social Psychology, 1973
- Bem, D. J. (1983). "Toward a response style theory of persons in situations". Nebr Symp Motiv: 201–31. PMID 6843717.
- Bem, D. J. (September 1977). "Predicting more of the people more of the time: some thoughts on the Allen-Potkay studies of intraindividual variability". J Pers. 45 (3): 327–33. doi:10.1111/j.1467-6494.1977.tb00155.x. PMID 894467.
- Bem, D. J. (March 1972). "Constructing cross-situational consistencies in behavior: some thoughts on Alker's critique of Mischel". J Pers. 40 (1): 17–26. doi:10.1111/j.1467-6494.1972.tb00645.x. PMID 5013145.
- Bem, D. J.; McConnell, H. K. (January 1970). "Testing the self-perception explanation of dissonance phenomena: on the salience of premanipulation attitudes". J Pers Soc Psychol. 14 (1): 23–31. doi:10.1037/h0020916. PMID 5435536. S2CID 26730816.
- Bem, D. J. (May 1967). "Self-perception: An alternative interpretation of cognitive dissonance phenomena". Psychol Rev. 74 (3): 183–200. doi:10.1037/h0024835. PMID 5342882.
- Bem, D. J. (June 1966). "Inducing belief in false confessions". J Pers Soc Psychol. 3 (6): 707–10. doi:10.1037/h0023226. PMID 5939010.
- Wallach, M. A.; Kogan, N.; Bem, D. J. (August 1962). "Group influence on individual risk taking" (PDF). J Abnorm Soc Psychol. 65 (2): 75–86. doi:10.1037/h0044376. hdl:2027.42/108371. PMID 14004673.
- Bem, DJ. (March 2011). "Feeling the future: experimental evidence for anomalous retroactive influences on cognition and affect". Journal of Personality and Social Psychology (100(3)): 407-25. doi:10.1037/a0021524. PMID 21280961.
