= Childhood gender nonconformity =

Prepubescent children not following their assigned gender roles

Childhood gender nonconformity (CGN) is a phenomenon in which prepubescent children do not conform to expected gender-related sociological or psychological patterns, or identify with the opposite sex/gender. Typical behavior among those who exhibit the phenomenon includes but is not limited to a propensity to cross-dress, refusal to take part in activities conventionally thought suitable for the gender and the exclusive choice of play-mates of the opposite sex.

Multiple studies have correlated childhood gender nonconformity with eventual homosexuality. In these studies, a majority of those who identify as gay or lesbian self-report being gender nonconforming as children. The therapeutic community is divided over the proper response to childhood gender nonconformity.

Gender nonconforming children face gender policing from both adults and peers, including bullying and violence based on their gender nonconformity. Gender policing at a young age can increase the risk of alcohol use, anxiety, and depression in adulthood.

== Manifestations ==
Gender nonconformity in children can have many forms, reflecting various ways in which a child relates to their gender. In literature, gender variance and gender atypicality are used synonymously with gender nonconformity.

- Cross-gender clothing preferences;
- Playing with toys generally associated with the opposite sex;
- Preference for playmates of the opposite sex;
- Identification with characters of the opposite sex in stories, cartoons or films;
- Affirmation of the desire to be a member of the opposite sex;
- Strong verbal affirmation of a cross-gender identity.

== Social and developmental theories of gender ==
The concept of childhood gender nonconformity assumes that there is a correct way to be a girl or a boy. There are a number of social and developmental perspectives that explore how children come to identify with a particular gender and engage in activities that are associated with this gender role.

Psychoanalytic theories of gender emphasize that children begin to identify with the parent, and that girls tend to identify with their mothers and boys with their fathers. The identification is often associated with the child's realization that they do not share the same genitals with both parents. According to Freud's theories, this discovery leads to penis envy in girls and castration anxiety in boys. Although there is not much empirical evidence to back up Freud, his theories sparked new conversations surrounding sexuality and gender, conversations his daughter Anna Freud continued in her research.

Social learning theory emphasizes the rewards and punishments that children receive for sex appropriate or inappropriate behaviors. One of the criticisms of social learning theory is that it assumes that children are passive, rather than active participants in their social environment.

Cognitive development theory argues that children are active in defining gender and behaving in ways that reflect their perceptions of gender roles. Children are in search of regularities and consistencies in their environment, and the pursuit of cognitive consistency motivates children to behave in ways that are congruent with the societal constructions of gender.

Gender schema theory is a hybrid model that combines social learning and cognitive development theories. Developed by Sandra Bem in 1981, her husband Daryl J. Bem argues that children have a cognitive readiness to learn about themselves and their surroundings. They build schemas to help them navigate their social world, and these schemas form a larger network of associations and beliefs about gender and gender roles.

== Influences of androgens ==
=== Toy preference studies ===
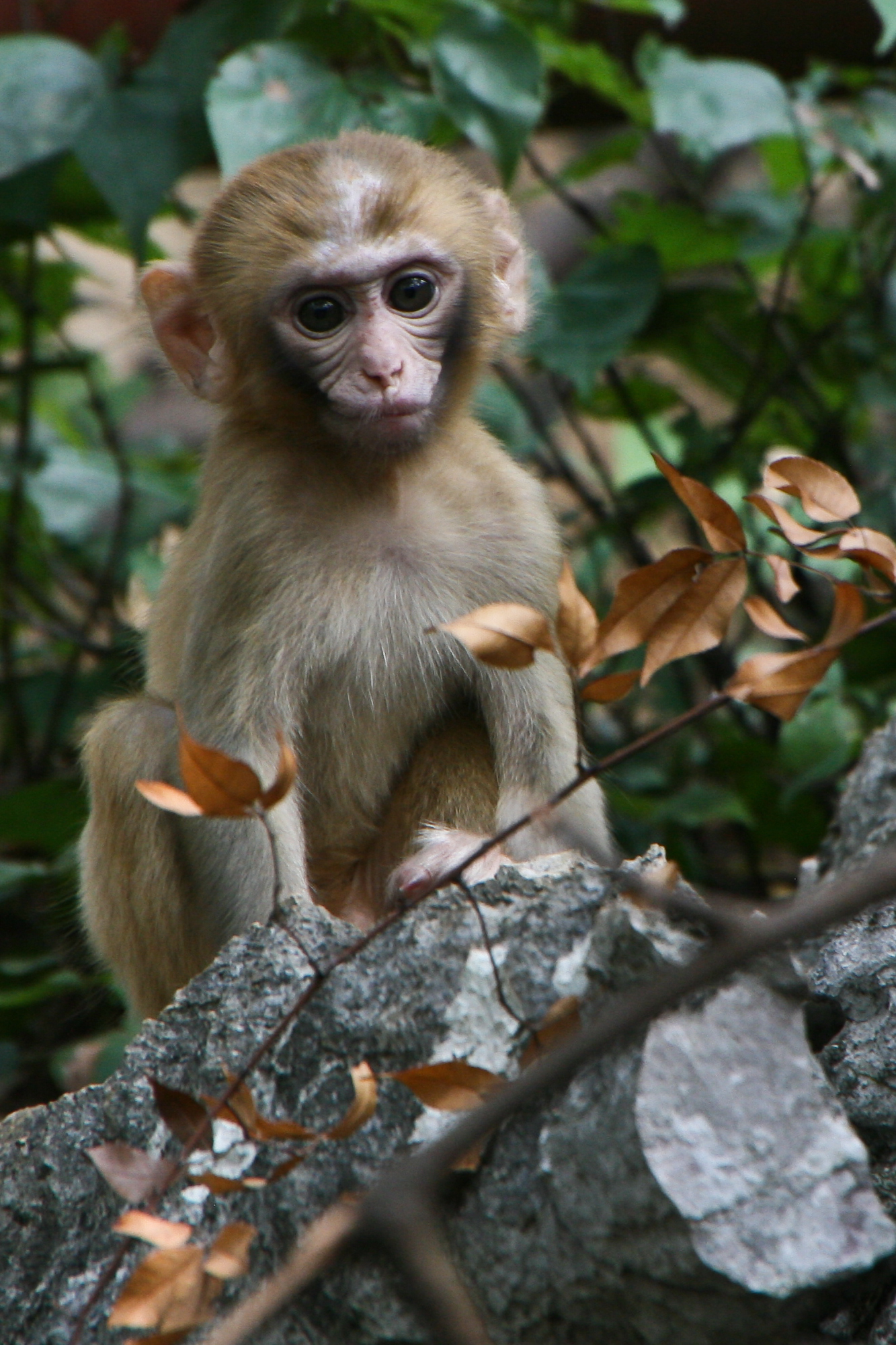
Studies with young rhesus macaques suggest that some gender-typical preferences may not only be caused by human socialization.

According to popular gender stereotypes toys for girls tend to be round and pink, while toys for boys tend to be angular and blue. The subtle characteristics of toys may differentially appeal to the developing brains of female and male children. In a study of toy preferences of twelve- to 24-month-old infants, males spent more time looking at cars than females and females spent more time looking at dolls than males. No preference for color was found, and within each sex, both boys and girls preferred dolls to cars at age 12 months. A study of preschool-aged children found that the cultural labeling of toys as "gender-appropriate" impacted toy preferences. In partial contrast to this view, certain animal studies have lent support for biologically determined gendered toy preferences. In a study of juvenile rhesus monkeys, when given the option between plush or wheeled toys, female monkeys gravitated toward both toys, while male monkeys mainly preferred toys with wheels. These findings suggest that gendered preferences for toys can occur without the complex socialization processes found in humans. Female rhesus monkeys also tend to engage in more nurturing play activities, while males tend to engage in more rough-and-tumble play. However, the co-author of the study warned about overinterpreting the results, stating "The plush and wheeled categories served as proxies for feminine and masculine, but other toy characteristics, such as size or colour, might explain the male's behaviour, or the male monkeys might seek out more physically active toys."

Girls with congenital adrenal hyperplasia (CAH) have atypically high blood concentrations of testosterone. In studies of toy preference, these girls show increased interest in male-typical toys, like trucks and balls. Overall, their play habits and preferences more closely resembled male-typical play than female-typical play. Even with children exposed to a normal range of prenatal androgens, increased testosterone was associated with increased preference for male-typical toys, and decreased prenatal testosterone was associated with a greater interest in female-typical toys.

Overall, the degree of androgen exposure during prenatal and postnatal development may bias males and females toward specific cognitive processes, which are further reinforced through processes of socialization. The male interest in balls and wheeled toys may relate to the androgenised brains preference for objects that move through space. The higher levels of androgens in the developing male brain could elicit greater attraction to cars and balls, while lower levels of androgens elicit a preference for dolls and nurturing activities in the female brain.

Cordelia Fine criticizes toy-preference studies in non-human primates. She explains the disparity across research and the labeling of toys, with the rhesus monkey study deeming stuffed animals as inherently feminine, all the while a study with vervet monkeys shows males displaying a preference for stuffed dogs. Moreover, the effects of hormonal treatment are deemed inconclusive and significant long-term effects on rhesus monkeys being nonexistent, with treated prenatal females showing no increase in aggression and still adopting "feminine" social roles into adulthood.

On the subject of congenital adrenal hyperplasia, Fine presents the argument of correlation being confused for causality; are females with CAH interested in typically masculine activities due to their having an innate quality or is this a result of their association with boys and men as a gender? If a visual and spatial value is deemed as a preeminent element in typically masculine toys (such as trucks), females with CAH and males in studies should consequently show a much higher interest for neutral toys such as puzzles and sketchpads (as opposed to non-CAH females), something which they do not.

=== Playmate and play-style preferences ===
Children's preference for same-sex playmates is a robust finding that has been observed in many human cultures and across a number of animal species. Preference for same-sex playmates is at least partially linked to socialization processes, but children may also gravitate toward peers with similar play styles. Girls generally engage in more nurturing-and-mothering-type behaviors, while boys show greater instances of rough-and-tumble play. For much of human history, people lived in small hunter-gatherer societies. Over time evolutionary forces may have selected for children's play activities related to adult survival skills.

However, it is not uncommon for girls and boys to prefer opposite-sex playmates and to engage in gender-atypical play styles. As with toy preferences, androgens may be involved in playmate and play style preferences. Girls who have congenital adrenal hyperplasia (CAH) typically engage in more rough-and-tumble play. Hines and Kaufman (1994) found that 50% of girls with CAH reported a preference for boys as playmates, while less than 10% of their non-CAH sisters preferred boys as playmates. Another study found that girls with CAH still preferred same-sex playmates, but their atypical play styles resulted in them spending more time alone engaging in their preferred activities. Girls with CAH are more likely to have masculinized genitalia, and it has been suggested that this could lead parents to treat them more like boys; however, this claim is unsubstantiated by parental reports.

=== Adult traits ===
There have been a number of studies correlating childhood gender nonconformity (CGN) and sexual orientation; however, the relationship between CGN and personality traits in adulthood has been largely overlooked. Lippa measured CGN, gender-related occupational preferences, self-ascribed masculinity-femininity and anxiety in heterosexual and homosexual women and men through self-report measures. Gay men showed a tendency toward more feminine self-concepts than heterosexual men. Similarly, lesbian women reported "higher self-ascribed masculinity, more masculine occupational preferences, and more CGN than heterosexual women." Lippa's study found stronger correlations in CGN and adult personality traits in men than in women. Overall, Lippa's study suggests that gender nonconforming behaviors are relatively stable across a person's life-time.

One of the advantages of Lippa's study is the relatively high sample size of 950 participants, which was diverse both in terms of representations of sexual orientation and ethnicity. Although there may be a tendency to want to generalize these findings to all heterosexual and homosexual men and women, an awareness that a tendency toward certain behaviors does not mean that they are a monolithic group is necessary; for some individuals, sexual orientation may be the only thing they have in common.

=== Measures of anxiety ===
CGN is associated with higher levels of psychological distress in gay men than in lesbian women. The findings were extended to heterosexual men and women, where "CGN [was] associated with psychological distress in heterosexual men but not in heterosexual women." In effect, "CGN impacts men more negatively than women, regardless of sexual orientation." The pattern of results may be derived from society's greater acceptance of typically masculine behaviors in girls, and discouragement of typically feminine behaviors in boys.

== Sexual orientation ==
A great deal of research has been conducted on the relationship between CGN and sexual orientation. Gay men often report being feminine boys, and lesbian women often report being masculine girls. In men, CGN is a strong predictor of sexual orientation in adulthood, but this relationship is not as well understood in women. Women with CAH reported more male typical play behaviours and showed less heterosexual interest.

The fraternal birth order effect is a well-documented phenomenon that predicts that a man's odds of being homosexual increase 33-48% with each older brother that the man has. Research has shown that the mother develops an immune response due to blood factor incompatibility with male fetuses. With each male fetus, the mother's immune system responds more strongly to what it perceives as a threat. The mother's immune response can disrupt typical prenatal hormones, like testosterone, which have been implicated in both childhood gender nonconformity and adult sexual orientation.

Bem proposed a theory on the relationship between childhood gender nonconformity, which he refers to as the "exotic become erotic" (EBE). Bem argues that biological factors, such as prenatal hormones, genes and neuroanatomy, predispose children to behave in ways that do not conform to their sex assigned at birth. Gender nonconforming children will often prefer opposite-sex playmates and activities. These become alienated from their same-sex peer group. As children enter adolescence "the exotic becomes erotic" where dissimilar and unfamiliar same-sex peers produce arousal, and the general arousal becomes eroticized over time. Critiques of Bem's theory in the journal Psychological Review concluded that "studies cited by Bem and additional research show that Exotic Becomes Erotic theory is not supported by scientific evidence." Bem was criticized for relying on a non-random sample of gay men from the 1970s and for drawing conclusions that appear to contradict the original data. An "examination of the original data showed virtually all respondents were familiar with children of both sexes", and that only 9% of gay men said that "none or only a few" of their friends were male, and most gay men (74%) reported having "an especially close friend of the same sex" during grade school. It is also noted that "71% of gay men reported feeling different from other boys, but so did 38% of heterosexual men. The difference for gay men is larger, but still indicates that feeling different from same-sex peers was common for heterosexual men." Bem also acknowledged that gay men were more likely to have older brothers (the fraternal birth order effect), which appeared to contradict an unfamiliarity with males. Bem cited cross-cultural studies which also "appear to contradict the EBE theory assertion", such as the Sambia tribe in Papua New Guinea, which ritually enforced homosexual acts among teenagers, yet once these boys reached adulthood, only a small proportion of men continued to engage in homosexual behaviour - similar to levels observed in the United States. Additionally, Bem's theory is criticized for misrepresenting common experiences of lesbians.

In 2003, Lorene Gottschalk, a self-described radical feminist suggested there may be a reporting bias linking gender nonconformity to homosexuality. Researchers have explored the possibility of bias by comparing childhood home videos with self-reports of gender nonconformity, finding that the presence of gender nonconformity was highly consistent with self-reporting, emerged early and carried on into adulthood.

== Gender dysphoria ==
Children with gender dysphoria, also known as gender identity disorder (GID), exhibit the typical gender-nonconforming patterns of behaviors, such as a preference for toys, playmates, clothing, and play-styles that are typically associated with the opposite sex. Children with GID will sometimes display disgust toward their own genitals or changes that occur in puberty (e.g. facial hair or menstruation). A diagnosis of GID in children requires evidence of discomfort, confusion, or aversion to the gender roles associated with the child's genetic sex. Children do not necessarily have to express a desire to be the opposite sex, but it is still taken into consideration when making a diagnosis. Since the DSM-5 was released in 2013, children must express a desire to be of a gender different to that assigned at birth for a diagnosis of gender dysphoria in childhood.

Some advocates have argued that a DSM-IV diagnosis legitimizes the experiences of these children, making it easier to rally around a medically defined disorder, in order to raise public awareness and garner funding for future research and therapies. Diagnoses of gender identity disorder in children (GIDC) remains controversial, as many argue that the label pathologizes behaviors and cognitions that fall within the normal variation within gender. The stigma associated with mental health disorders may do more harm than good. The DSM-5 renamed the condition gender dysphoria to avoid this stigma.

== Parental reactions ==
Parents with gender non-conforming children may not know where to turn to express their feelings. Many parents accept their child's behavior, but are more concerned about the overall well-being of the child. In some cases families are not accepting of their child's non-conformity, typically lashing out with punishment grounded on homophobia and sexism. Regardless of the stance a parent decides to take on gender non-conformity, it will affect the child and the child's relationship with the family.

Transphobia can occur when gender nonconforming children are met with others who do not understand or accept what they are going through. Diane Ehrensaft states that, "Transphobia is the anxieties, prejudices, aspersion, aggression, and hatred cast on individuals who do not accept the gender assigned to them at birth but instead play outside that definition of self or perhaps any binary categorizations of gender, possibly to the extent of altering their body." Transphobia can become a serious conflict within the family and can damage the relationship the child has with his or her family.

Parents who recognize that they have gender non-conforming children sometimes experience a feeling of loss, shock, denial, anger, and despair. These feelings typically subside as a parent learns more about gender nonconformity. However, there are families that remain unaccepting of gender nonconformity and correlate it to psychological or social problems. Licensed Marriage and Family Therapist Jean Malpas says, "Some react very negatively and the gender nonconformity can become a significant source of conflict between parents and a damaging source of disconnection between parent and child."

Diane Ehrensaft divides families into three types, affecting the outcome of a child's gender transition. "Transformers", in her system, are comfortable in supporting their child in their gender-variant journey and can easily identify their child as a separate person; Ehrensaft says they "will stand a good chance of overcoming whatever transphobic reactions may reside within them to evolve into parents who both meet their child where he or she is and become an advocate for their gender-nonconforming child in the outside world." "Transphobics" are not comfortable in their own gender, may not understand that gender is fluid, may feel their child is an extension of themselves, and respond negatively when their child is faced with adversity; Ehrensaft believes that these parents undermine the love they express for their children with excessive negativity and transphobic "reactivity", denying the child room for nonconformity. Finally, "transporters" appear to be completely accepting of their child's gender nonconformity, while privately doubting its authenticity, and may say things like "it's just a phase" or "they'll grow out of it."

== Peer reactions ==
Once children reach school age, girls who are considered "tomboys" and boys who are considered to be more "sensitive" than their gender-typical peers are more likely to face challenges during childhood than their gender-typical counterparts. It is possible that their nonconformity goes unnoticed, however, it is more likely that they fall victim to bullying and harassment when they reach school age. In a study on gender-atypical fifteen year olds, atypical males self-report being lonelier, bullied more, less likely to have male friends, and be in "greater distress" than gender-typical males in the same demographic.

== Needs of gender-nonconforming children and families ==
There is still controversy regarding the best approach for gender nonconforming children, but as gender nonconformity becomes more widely accepted many parents and professionals have identified things that gender variant or gender nonconforming children need to easily adjust to their transformation. Parents have suggested that their children need the ability to discuss their gender non-conformity freely with their parents, to be loved throughout their transformation, and to be permitted to make choices regarding their gender on their own. They have also suggested a peer support team and supportive counseling in addition to support from their school and schools administrators and authorities.

Parents must be mindful of a child's need for parent expressions of acceptance and validation. If not validated, a child may begin sharing less with their parent and more with friends, this could lead to the parent thinking the gender nonconformity was just a brief phase.

Disclosure is also very important to a family when raising a gender non-conforming child. Parents need to consider whom to talk to about their child and what type of information they decide to share. Other members of the family must also be prepared to make decisions regarding what to say and whom to say it to.

Regarding their own needs, parents have suggested that they need information regarding gender nonconforming children that can better assist them and their child in making their transition. Additionally, parents have stated they need increased education on gender-nonconforming children, and support from surrounding friends and family to help build parental confidence. Parents have also suggested they need counseling to help provide direction, support from medical professionals and peers, and access to transgender people to help provide them with a positive portrayal of transgender communities.

== See also ==
- Gender roles in childhood
- Gender variance
- Pinaforing
- Sissy
- Tomboy
- Gendered associations of pink and blue
