= Handedness and sexual orientation =

Research hypothesis

A relationship between handedness and sexual orientation has been suggested by a number of researchers, who report that heterosexual individuals are somewhat more likely to be right-handed than are homosexual individuals within both sexes.

The psychologist Chris McManus and a team of researchers weighed in on the relationship to homosexuality and concluded:

Many studies in the 1980s and 1990s had asked whether there was any relationship with handedness, and we, like others, had concluded that there was not. However, a meta-analysis of 20 studies, including our own, with a grand total of 6182 homosexual men altered that situation, male homosexuals having a significantly higher likelihood of being left-handed. The earlier studies had mostly failed through being too small, a typical study having about 300 homosexual men, and hence being under-powered. That was later confirmed in the large BBC Internet study of sex and sexuality, where 4616 male homosexuals showed a significant excess of left-handedness, with a similar effect found in the 2008 female homosexuals.

— McManus, Chris, "Half a century of handedness research: Myths, truths; fictions, facts; backwards, but mostly forwards", Brain and Neuroscience Advances (2019)

== Studies ==
=== Lalumière et al., 2000 meta-analysis ===
Lalumière et al. conducted a meta-analysis of 20 studies with a total of 6,987 homosexual and 16,423 heterosexual participants. They found that homosexual men had a 34% greater odds of not being right-handed, and homosexual women had a 91% greater odds (39% overall).

=== Williams et al., 2000 ===
In a study involving 382 men (278 homosexual and 104 heterosexual) no significant association emerged between handedness and sexual orientation.

=== Mustanski et al., 2002 study ===
Mustanski et al. examined sexual orientation and hand preference in a sample of 382 men (205 heterosexual; 177 homosexual) and 354 women (149 heterosexual; 205 homosexual). Although a significantly higher proportion of homosexual women was found to be left-handed compared to heterosexual women (18% vs. 10%), no significant differences were found between heterosexual and homosexual men with respect to hand preference.

=== Lippa, 2003 study ===
Lippa examined sexual orientation and handedness in a sample of 812 men (351 heterosexual; 461 homosexual) and 1,189 women (707 heterosexual; 472 homosexual). Homosexual men were 82% more likely to be non-right-handed than heterosexual men, but no significant differences were found between heterosexual and homosexual women in terms of handedness. When combining men and women into one large sample, homosexual individuals were 50% more likely to be non-right-handed than heterosexual individuals.

=== Blanchard et al., 2006 study ===
Blanchard et al. argued that the fraternal birth order effect (the probability that a boy will be homosexual increases with the number of older brothers who have the same biological mother) appears to be limited to right-handed men. Moreover, the same study indicates that left-handed men without older brothers are more likely to be homosexual than non-right-handed men who have older brothers. As Blanchard et al. said in their report,

The odds of homosexuality is higher for men who have a non-right hand preference or who have older brothers, relative to men with neither of these features, but the odds for men with both features are similar to the odds for men with neither.

=== BBC survey ===
In a multinational online survey, it was found that gay men and lesbians are more likely to be left-handed (13 and 11%, respectively) than heterosexual men and women (11% and 10%, respectively). Bisexuals of both sexes more often described themselves as ambidextrous than gay or heterosexual individuals of the same sex (bisexual men: 12%; gay and heterosexual men: 8%; bisexual women: 16%; lesbians: 12%; heterosexual women: 8%).

=== Blanchard, 2008 Archives of Sexual Behavior study ===
A subsequent study by Blanchard found that both right-handed homosexual men and left-handed heterosexual men had a statistically significant number of older male siblings, but that there was no significant observable effect either for right-handed heterosexual men or for left-handed homosexual men.

=== Blanchard, 2008 Laterality study ===
Blanchard discussed ways in which the fraternal birth order effect and handedness could be explained in terms of the maternal immune hypothesis. In this, the mother is assumed to grow more immune to male antigens with each pregnancy, and thus produce a greater number of "anti-male" antibodies. He suggests two possibilities: Either that non-right-handed fetuses are less sensitive to the antibodies, or that the mothers of left-handed fetuses do not, for some reason, produce them.

=== Schwartz et al., 2010 hair whorl study ===
In a sample including 694 gay men and 894 straight men, it was found that 13.9% of gay men and 15.9% of straight men were not right-handed, a non-significant difference. The study replicated the 'older brother effect' for homosexual men, but unlike Blanchard (2006) (see above), it found that the effect applied to both right-handed and left-handed gay men, being in effect stronger for the latter than for the former.

=== Kishida and Rahman, 2015 ===
In a sample of 478 heterosexual men and 425 homosexual men, gay men were found to show a significantly greater likelihood of extreme right-handedness and non-right-handedness compared to heterosexual men.

=== Lee Ellis et al., 2016 ===
Among a sample of university students in Malaysia and the United States, it was found that same-sex attraction was linked with left-handedness among women. Among men, no such correlation was found after controlling for ethnicity.

=== Asexuality ===
A 2014 Internet study attempted to analyze the relationship between self-identification as asexual, handedness and other biological markers, in comparison to individuals of other sexual orientation groups. A total of 325 asexuals (60 men and 265 women), 690 heterosexuals (190 men and 500 women), and 268 non-heterosexuals (64 men and 204 women) completed online questionnaires. The study asserts that asexual men and women were 2.4 and 2.5 times, respectively, more likely to not be right-handed than their heterosexual counterparts.

== See also ==
- Autism and LGBT identities
- Biology and sexual orientation
- Digit ratio
- Fraternal birth order and male sexual orientation
- Handedness § Sexuality and gender identity
- Laterality
- Prenatal hormones and sexual orientation
- Transgender
