= H-Y antigen =

Sex-specific cell surface antigen in mammals

anti-Müllerian hormone

Identifiers
- Symbol: AMH
- NCBI gene: 268
- HGNC: 464
- OMIM: 600957
- RefSeq: NM_000479
- UniProt: P03971

Other data
- Locus: Chr. 19 p13.3
Search for
- Structures: Swiss-model
- Domains: InterPro

Lysine-Specific Demethylase 5D protein

Identifiers
- Symbol: KDM5D
- Alt. symbols: HYA, SMCY
- HGNC: 11115
- OMIM: 426000
- RefSeq: NM_004653
- UniProt: Q9BY66

Other data
- Locus: Chr. Y q11.223
Search for
- Structures: Swiss-model
- Domains: InterPro

Male Enhanced Antigen 1

Identifiers
- Symbol: MEA1
- Alt. symbols: HYS
- HGNC: 6986
- OMIM: 143170
- RefSeq: NM_001318942
- UniProt: Q16626

Other data
- Locus: Chr. 6 p21.1
Search for
- Structures: Swiss-model
- Domains: InterPro

H-Y antigen is a male tissue specific antigen. Originally thought to trigger the formation of testes (via loci, an autosomal gene that generates the antigen and one that generates the receptor) it is now known that it does not trigger the formation of testes but may be activated by the formation of testes.

There are several antigens which qualify as H-Y as defined by rejection of male skin grafts in female hosts or detected by cytotoxic T cells or antibodies. One H-Y, secreted by the testis, defined by antibodies, is identical to Müllerian-inhibiting substance (AMH gene). Another H-Y, minor histocompatibility antigen, seemed to be encoded in the SMCY gene (acronym for 'selected mouse cDNA on Y'), later identified as an 11-residue peptide from the Lysine-Specific Demethylase 5D protein (KDM5D gene) presented by HLA-B7. A third example is MEA1.

== Association with spermatogenesis ==
It has been shown that male mice lacking in the H-Y antigen, hence lacking in the gene producing it, have also lost genetic information responsible for spermatogenesis. This result also identified a gene on the mouse Y chromosome, distinct from the testis-determining gene, that was essential for spermatogenesis, thus raising the possibility that the very product of this "spermatogenesis gene" is the H-Y antigen.

== Male homosexuality and the birth order effect ==
Among humans, it has been observed that men with more older brothers tend to have a higher chance of being homosexual (see Fraternal birth order and male sexual orientation). For every additional older brother, a man's chance of being homosexual can rise by up to 33%. One theory to explain this involves H-Y antigens, which suggests that a maternal immune reaction to these antigens has, to an extent, an inhibitory effect on the masculinization of the brain, and therefore, the more male foetuses that the mother of a man has had, the greater the maternal immune response towards him and thus the greater the inhibitory effect on brain masculinization, which is believed to be a factor in sexual orientation.

This hypothesis is supported by evidence that older sisters have no discernible influence on the sexual orientation of later-born males, which would be expected since H-Y antigen is male tissue specific, the 'probable involvement of H-Y antigen in the development of sex-typical traits, and the detrimental effects of immunization of female mice to H-Y antigen on the reproductive performance of subsequent male offspring'. More specifically, recent research (Jan 2018) has found maternal antibodies to the neuroligin NLGN4Y protein, a Y-chromosome protein important in male fetal brain development, to be involved in the fraternal birth order effect.
