= Charles Honorton =

American parapsychologist

Charles Henry Honorton
- Born: 5 February 1946; Deer River, Minnesota
- Died: 4 November 1992 (aged 46)
- Occupation: Parapsychologist

Charles Henry Honorton (February 5, 1946 – November 4, 1992) was an American parapsychologist and was one of the leaders of a collegial group of researchers who were determined to apply established scientific research methods to the examination of what they called "anomalous information transfer" (extrasensory perception) and other phenomena associated with the "mind/body problem"—the idea that mind might, at least in some respects, have a physical existence independent of the body.

== Biography ==
Over several decades, Honorton conducted many experiments, the most famous and significant of which involved the use of the Ganzfeld experiment technique for creating a state of sensory deprivation. His hypothesis was that the information "channel," or transfer mechanism, in ESP was "weak" and easily diluted or drowned out by normal sensory input.

Honorton rejected the term parapsychology, instead preferring to approach extra-sensory perception as one would any other area of psychophysics, "for the first time in history, we have begun to forge an empirical approach to one of the most profound and ancient of mysteries, the nature of mind and its relationship to the physical world."

Honorton was a research fellow at the Institute for Parapsychology in Durham, North Carolina, from 1966 to 1967, a research associate, then senior research associate, then director of Research Division of Parapsychology and Psychophysics at Maimonides Medical Center in Brooklyn, New York, from 1967 to 1979. After that he became the director of Psychophysical Research Laboratories in the Forrestal Research Center located in Princeton, New Jersey, from 1979 to 1989, and from there he moved on to become a researcher at Edinburgh University from 1991 until his death.

In 1971, Felicia Parise, an American psychic, allegedly moved a pill bottle across a kitchen counter by psychokinesis. Her feats were endorsed by Honorton. Science writer Martin Gardner wrote Parise had "bamboozled" Honorton by moving the bottle by an invisible thread stretched between her hands.

A review published by Daryl Bem and Honorton (posthumously), "Does Psi Exist? Replicable Evidence for an Anomalous Process of Information Transfer" in 1994 provided a discussion of the pairs evaluation of Ganzfeld research, criticisms, refinements and implications. The review was criticized by Richard Wiseman, Terence Hines, Ray Hyman among others who identified a number of errors in the piece which cast considerable doubt on the scholarship and conclusions argued.

Honorton died in on November 4, 1992, of a heart attack.
