= Prenatal hormones and sexual orientation =

Hormonal theory of sexuality

The hormonal theory of sexuality holds that, just as exposure to certain hormones plays a role in fetal sex differentiation, such exposure also influences the sexual orientation that emerges later in the individual. Prenatal hormones may be seen as the primary determinant of adult sexual orientation, or a co-factor.

== Sex-typed behavior ==
The hormonal theory of sexuality holds that, just as exposure to certain hormones plays a role in fetal sex differentiation, such exposure also influences the sexual orientation that emerges later in the adult. Differences in brain structure that come about from chemical messengers and genes interacting on developing brain cells are believed to be the basis of sex differences in countless behaviors, including sexual orientation. Prenatal factors that affect or interfere with the interaction of these hormones on the developing brain can influence later sex-typed behavior in children. This hypothesis is originated from experimental studies in non-human mammals, yet the argument that similar effects can be seen in human neurobehavioral development is a much debated topic among scholars. Recent studies, however, have provided evidence in support of prenatal androgen exposure influencing childhood sex-typed behavior.

Fetal hormones may be seen as either the primary influence upon adult sexual orientation or as a co-factor interacting with genes. Garcia-Falgueras and Dick Swaab disagree that social conditions influence sexual orientation to a large degree. As seen in young children as well as in vervet and rhesus monkeys, sexually differentiated behavior in toy preference is differing in males versus females, where females prefer dolls and males prefer toy balls and cars; these preferences can be seen as early as 3–8 months in humans. It is impossible to completely rule out the social environment or the child's cognitive understanding of gender when discussing sex typed play in androgen-exposed girls. Conversely, children tend towards objects which have been labelled for their own sex, or toys that they have seen members of their sex playing with previously.

An endocrinology study by Garcia-Falgueras and Swaab postulated that "In humans, the main mechanism responsible of [sic] sexual identity and orientation involves a direct effect of testosterone on the developing brain." Further, their study puts forward that intrauterine exposure to hormones is largely determinative. Sketching the argument briefly here, the authors say that sexual organs are differentiated first, and then the brain is sexually differentiated "under the influence, mainly, of sex hormones such as testosterone, estrogen and progesterone on the developing brain cells and under the presence of different genes as well ... The changes brought about in this stage are permanent. ... Sexual differentiation of the brain is not caused by hormones alone, even though they are very important for gender identity and sexual orientation."

=== Organizational aspects ===
Embryonic gonads develop primarily based on whether there is an SRY gene, normally present on the Y chromosome. If SRY exists, then the gonads develop as testes, and commence the production of androgen hormones, mainly testosterone, dihydrotestosterone (DHT) and androstenedione; production of testosterone and conversion into dihydrotestosterone during weeks 6 to 12 of pregnancy are key factors in the production of a penis, scrotum and prostate. On the other hand, absence of these levels of androgens results in development of typically female genitals. Following this, sexual differentiation of the brain occurs; sex hormones exert organizational effects on the brain that will be activated in puberty. As a result of these two processes occurring separately, the degree of genital masculinization does not necessarily relate to the masculinization of the brain. Sex differences in the brain have been found in many structures, most notably the hypothalamus and the amygdala. However, few of these have been related to behavioral sex differences, and scientists are still working to establish firm links between early hormones, brain development and behavior. The study of the organizational theory of prenatal hormones can be difficult, as ethically researchers cannot alter hormones in a developing fetus; instead, scholars must rely on naturally occurring abnormalities of development to provide answers.

Most extensively studied in organizational effects of hormones is congenital adrenal hyperplasia (CAH). CAH is a genetic disease that results in exposure to high levels of androgens beginning early in gestation. Girls with CAH are born with masculinized genitalia, which is corrected surgically as soon as possible. CAH provides the opportunity for natural experiments, as people with CAH can be compared to people without it. However, "CAH is not a perfect experiment", since, "social responses to masculinized genitalia or factors related to the disease itself" can confound results. Nonetheless several studies have shown that CAH has a clear but not determining influence on sexual orientation; women with CAH are less likely to be exclusively heterosexual than are other women.

Since hormones alone do not determine sexual orientation and differentiation of the brain, the search for other factors that act upon sexual orientation have led genes such as the SRY and ZFY to be implicated.

=== Prenatal maternal stress ===
As of 2006 results from studies in humans had found conflicting evidence regarding the effect of prenatal exposure to hormones and psychosexual outcomes; Gooren noted in 2006 that studies in subprimate mammals are invalid measures of human sexual differentiation, as sex hormones follow a more "on-off" role in sex-typed behavior than is found in primates.

Some studies do suggest that prenatal stress significantly increases the likelihood of homosexuality or bisexuality, although varying evidence exists for which trimester is most important. Studies of endocrinology have found implications for amphetamines and thyroid-gland hormones to increase homosexuality in female offspring as well, although it has not been examined in conjunction with prenatal stress levels.

Some have postulated that postnatal (e.g., social and environmental factors) development can play a role in the sexual orientation of an individual, yet solid evidence of this has yet to be discovered. Children born through artificial insemination with donor sperm and consequently raised by lesbian couples have typically been heterosexually oriented. Summed up by Bao and Swaab, "The apparent impossibility of getting someone to change their sexual orientation ... is a major argument against the importance of the social environment in the emergence of homosexuality, as well as against the idea that homosexuality is a lifestyle choice."

=== Fraternal birth order ===
According to a multitude of studies over several decades, gay men have more older brothers on average, a phenomenon known as the fraternal birth order effect. It has been suggested that the greater the number of older male siblings the higher the level of androgen fetuses are exposed to. No evidence of birth order effects have been observed in women. The theory holds that the fraternal birth order effect is a result of a maternal immune response that is produced towards a factor of male development over several male pregnancies. Bogaert's hypothesis argues that "the target of the immune response may be male specific molecules on the surface of male fetal brain cells (e.g., including those in the anterior hypothalamus). Anti-male antibodies might bind to these molecules and thus interfere with their role in normal sexual differentiation, leading some later born males to being attracted to men as opposed to women." Garcia-Falgueras and Swaab state that "The ... fraternal birth order effect ... is putatively explained by an immunological response by the mother to a product of the Y chromosome of her sons. The chance of such an immune response to male factors would increase with every pregnancy resulting in the birth of a son."

Maternal antibodies against Y-chromosome neuroligin have been implicated in this effect, among other evidence that favours this theory. Further, while percentages of the likelihood of homosexuality have been estimated to be increased by 15–48% per older brother, these odds really account for only a few percent of the population; thus, this hypothesis cannot be universally applied to the majority of homosexual men. Most, but not all, studies have been able to reproduce the fraternal birth order effect. Some did not find any statistically significant difference in either the sibling composition or rate of older brothers of gay and straight men, including large, nationally representative studies in the US and Denmark. However, Blanchard reanalyzed Frisch's 2006 Danish study and found the birth order effect was in-fact present.

In conjunction with fraternal birth order, handedness provides further evidence of prenatal effects on sexual orientation, because handedness is regarded by many as a marker of early neurodevelopment. Other correlates to handedness (e.g., cerebral laterality, prenatal hormonal profiles, spatial ability) have been linked to sexual orientation, either empirically and/or theoretically. In right-handed individuals, the number of older brothers increased the odds of homosexual orientation, but this effect was not seen in left-handed individuals. As with other purported marks indicating higher incidence of homosexuality, however, the link with handedness remains ambiguous and several studies have been unable to replicate it.

==== Implicated genes in fraternal birth order ====
A gene of the Rh system has been discussed as a possible candidate for affecting fraternal birth order, as it has been linked to both handedness and immune system functioning. Gene variants in the Rh system are implicated in a maternal response to what is known as hemolytic disease of the newborn. Rh is a factor in blood, and in cases where the mother is absent of this (Rh-) while carrying an Rh+ fetus, an immune response may develop with deleterious effects. The Rh gene hypothesis is a strong candidate because not only does it involve the maternal immune response, but it has been implicated in handedness as well.

Variants of the androgen receptor (AR) gene have also been discussed, in that non-right-handedness in men has been linked with greater CAG repeats in the AR gene, which in turn is associated with lower testosterone. A theory that high prenatal testosterone leads to neuronal and axonal loss in the corpus callosum is supported by this hypothesis.

There is evidence that mutations in NLGN4X and NLGN4Y are linked to autism spectrum conditions and such conditions may be elevated in asexual people. Thus, NLGN4X/Y may affect neurological functioning associated with, broadly, the forming of social connections to others, including sexual/romantic ones.

==== Prenatal Thyroid Theory of Homosexuality/Gender Dysphoria ====
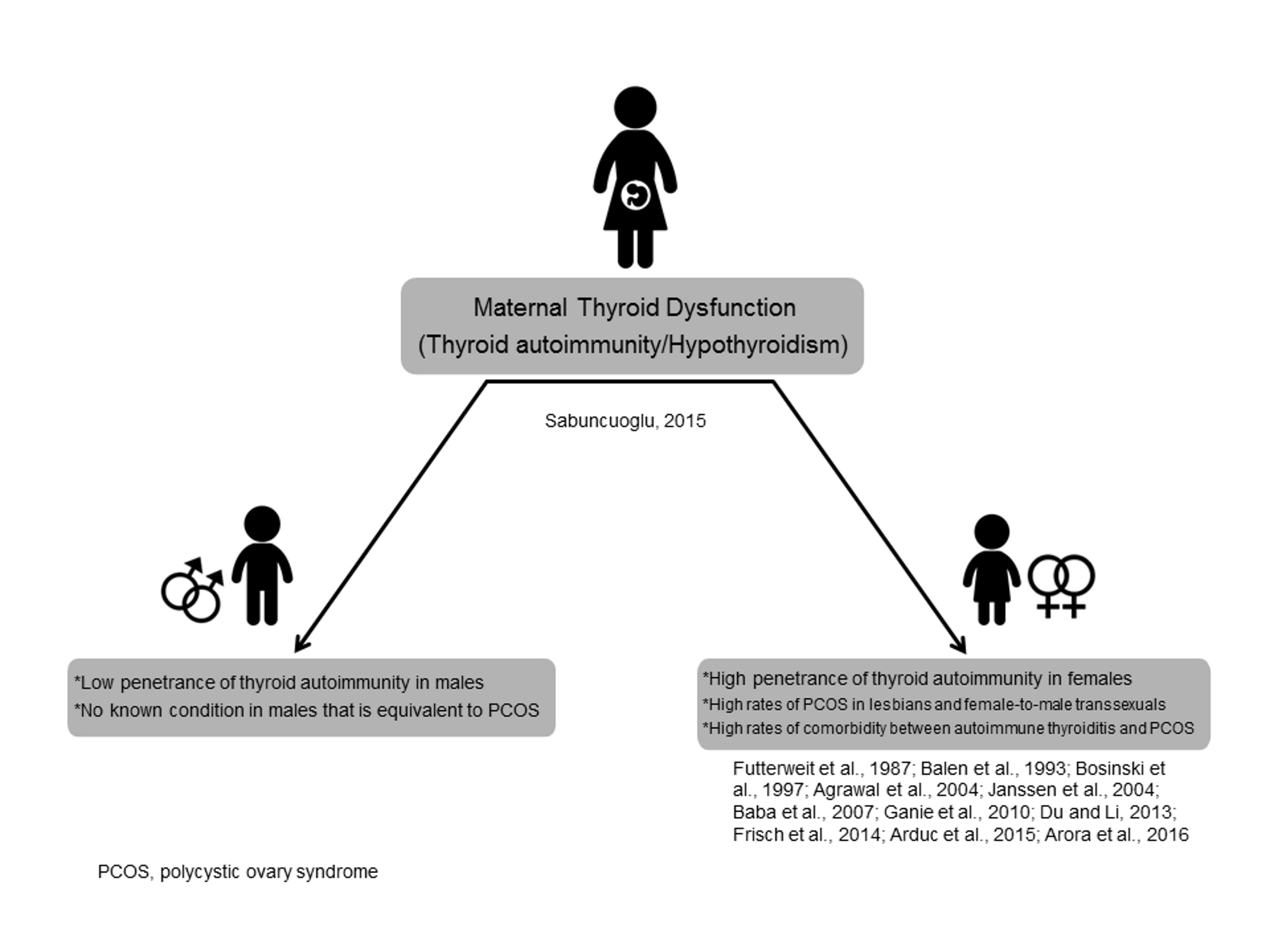

Prenatal thyroid theory of same-sex attraction/gender dysphoria has been based on clinical and developmental observations of youngsters presenting to child psychiatry clinics in Istanbul/Turkey. The report of 12 cases with same-sex attraction/gender dysphoria born to mothers with thyroid diseases was first presented in EPA Congress, Vienna (2015) and published as an article in the same year. The extremely significant relationship between the two conditions suggested an independent model, named as Prenatal Thyroid Model of Homosexuality. According to Turkish child & adolescent psychiatrist Osman Sabuncuoglu, who generated the theory, maternal thyroid dysfunction may lead to abnormal deviations from gender-specific development in the offspring. Autoimmune destructive process as seen in Hashimoto thyroiditis, diminished supply of thyroid hormones and impacts on prenatal androgen system were all considered as contributing mechanisms. In a follow-up theoretical paper, previous research findings indicating higher rates of polycystic ovary syndrome (PCOS) in female-to-male transsexuals and lesbian women were conceived as an indication of Prenatal Thyroid Model since PCOS and autoimmune thyroiditis are frequently comorbid diseases. Likewise, increased rates of autism spectrum disorder in children born to mothers with thyroid dysfunction and overrepresentation of ASD individuals in gender dysphoria populations suggest such an association. A second group of young children with this pattern were presented in IACAPAP Congress, Prague (2018). Furthermore, 9 additional cases were reported in IACAPAP Congress, Rio de Janeiro (Sabuncuoglu, 2024).

The findings from previous research in LGBT populations had called for attention to be paid to thyroid system. A commentary by Jeffrey Mullen, published shortly after the 2015 article, underlined the importance of Prenatal Thyroid Model and supported developments in this field. Afterwards, several authors have emphasized the role of thyroid system in sexuality while citing the Prenatal Thyroid Model. Among them, Carosa et al. concluded that thyroid hormones, affecting the human sexual function strongly, the thyroid gland must be considered, along with the genitals and the brain, a sexual organ. As a tertiary source, an authoritative book on the subject of interplay between endocrinology, brain and behavior has also cited the thyroid-homosexuality proposal article in the latest edition. Most importantly, a genome-wide genetic association study on male homosexuals identified a significant region on Chromosome 14 which is related to autoimmune thyroid dysfunction in human beings. This is apparently a big support to the Prenatal Thyroid Model.

=== Male homosexuality as hypermasculine ===
There is evidence of a correlation between sexual orientation and traits that are determined in utero. A study by McFadden in 1998 found that auditory systems in the brain, another physical trait influenced by prenatal hormones is different in those of differing orientations; likewise the suprachiasmatic nucleus (SCN) was found by Swaab and Hofman to be larger in homosexual men than in heterosexual men. The suprachiasmatic nucleus is also known to be larger in men than in women. An analysis of the hypothalamus by Swaab and Hofman (1990;2007) found that the volume of the SCN in homosexual men was 1.7 times larger than a reference group of male subjects, and contained 2.1 times as many cells. During development, the volume of the SCN and the cell counts reach peak value at approximately 13 to 16 months after birth; at this age, the SCN contains the same number of cells as was found in adult male homosexuals, yet in a reference group of heterosexual males the cell numbers begin to decline to the adult value of 35% of the peak value. These results were replicated and confirmed the findings. However; there also has yet to be a meaningful interpretation of these results provided in the context of human sexual orientation. Some highly disputed studies suggest gay men have also been shown to have higher levels of circulating androgens and larger penises, on average, than heterosexual men.

=== Male homosexuality as hypomasculine ===
In a 1991 study, Simon LeVay demonstrated that a tiny clump of neurons of the anterior hypothalamus—which is believed to control sexual behavior and linked to prenatal hormones—known as the interstitial nuclei of the anterior was, on average, more than twice the size in heterosexual men when contrasted to homosexual men. Due to this area also being nearly twice the size in heterosexual men than in heterosexual women, the implication is that the sexual differentiation of the hypothalamus in homosexuals is in a female direction. In 2003 scientists at Oregon State University announced that they had replicated his findings in sheep.

Other evidence pointed to the contrary: the SCN of homosexual males has been demonstrated to be larger (both the volume and the number of neurons are twice as many as in heterosexual males), contradicting the hypothesis that homosexual males have a "female hypothalamus". William Byne and colleagues also weighed and counted numbers of neurons in INAH3 tests not carried out by LeVay. The results for INAH3 weight were similar to those for INAH3 size; that is, the INAH3 weight for the heterosexual male brains was significantly larger than for the heterosexual female brains, while the results for the gay male group were between those of the other two groups but not quite significantly different from either. Finally, the same research has found that the INAH3 is smaller in volume in homosexual men than in heterosexual men because homosexual men have a higher neuronal packing density in the INAH3 than heterosexual men; there is no difference in the number or cross-sectional area of neurons in the INAH3 of homosexual versus heterosexual men.

=== Female homosexuality ===
Most empirical or theoretical research into women's sexual orientation has, historically, been guided by the idea of lesbians as essentially masculine and heterosexual women as essentially feminine. Typically, this belief is traced to the early "inversion theory" of sex researchers who state that homosexuality is a result of biological abnormalities that "invert" sexual attraction and personality. Handedness research has provided implications; because more men than women present a preference for their left hand, the higher proportion of non-right handedness that has been discovered among lesbians when compared to heterosexual women demonstrates a possible link of prenatal masculinization and sexual orientation. Backing this up are reports that lesbians display more masculinized 2D;4D digit ratios than heterosexual women, based on data gathered from at least six different laboratories. This effect has not yet been observed between homosexual and heterosexual males. However, the validity of this measure of digit ratios remains controversial as a predictor of prenatal androgen, as many other prenatal factors may play roles in bone growth in prenatal stages of development. While many studies have found results confirming this hypothesis, others have failed to replicate these findings, leaving the validity of this measure unconfirmed.

More recently, a meta-analysis (Swift-Gallant et al.), found digit ratios were more masculine in lesbians and more feminine in gay men. Gay men had more feminine digit ratios on both the right and left hands, contrary to previous analyses, such as Grimbos et al. which found “no association of 2D:4D with male sexual orientation”. Although previous studies tended to group bisexual and homosexual individuals as "non-heterosexual", or left them out completely, the Swift-Gallant meta-analysis found that bisexual individuals were more similar to heterosexual individuals in their digit ratios.

Diethylstilbestrol (DES), a synthetic estrogen based medication that has been in the past prescribed to prevent miscarriages, has also been studied in relation to women's sexual orientation. It has been observed to exert a masculinizing/defeminizing effect on the developing brain of the fetus. When compared to controls, higher percentages of DES-exposed women (17% vs 0%) reported that they had engaged in same-sex relations; however, the great majority of DES women stated an exclusively heterosexual orientation.

Girls with congenital adrenal hyperplasia (an autosomal recessive condition which results in high androgen levels during fetal development) have more masculinized sex role identities and are more likely to have a homosexual sexual orientation as adults than controls. An alternative explanation for this effect is the fact that girls with this condition are often born with masculinized external genitalia, which leads their parents to raise them in a more masculine manner, thus influencing their sexual orientation as adults. However, the degree to which the girls' genitals are masculinized does not correlate with their sexual orientation, suggesting that prenatal hormones are a stronger causal factor, not parental influence.

Together with congenital adrenal hyperplasia, DES studies have provided little support of the prenatal hormone theory of sexual orientation; they do, however, provide the framework for possible pathways to a homosexual orientation for a small number of women.

=== Gender dysphoria ===
In individuals with gender dysphoria, previously known as gender identity disorder (GID), prenatal exposure to testosterone has been hypothesized to have an effect on gender identity differentiation. The 2D;4D finger ratio, or relative lengths of the 2nd "index" and 4th "ring" fingers, has become a popular measure of prenatal androgen because of accumulated evidence suggesting the 2D;4D ratios are related to prenatal exposure to testosterone. Many children with gender dysphoria differentiate a homosexual orientation during adolescence, but not all of them; adults with "early onset", or a childhood history of cross-gender behavior, often have a homosexual orientation. Adults with "late onset", or those without a childhood history of said behavior, are more likely to have a non-homosexual orientation.

Prenatal androgen exposure has been associated with an increased chance of patient-initiated gender reassignment to male after being initially raised as female in early childhood or infancy. Gooren found that organizational effects of prenatal androgens are more prevalent in gender role behavior than in gender identity, and that there are preliminary findings that suggest evidence of a male gender identity being more frequent in patients with fully male-typical prenatal androgenization.

Individuals with complete androgen insensitivity syndrome are almost always brought up as females, and the differentiation of gender identity/role is feminine. This example is important in demonstrating that chromosomes and gonads alone do not dictate gender identity and role.

==== Transsexualism ====
Because organ differentiation and brain differentiation occur at different times, in rare cases transsexualism can result.

Drawing on some transsexualism cases, Garcia-Falgueras and Swaab state that "[f]rom these examples it appears that the direct action of testosterone on the developing brain in boys and the lack of such action on the developing brain in girls are crucial factors in the development of male and female gender identity and sexual orientation". Countless studies have been run on peripheral levels of sex steroids in male and female homosexuals, a considerable number of which claimed to find "less 'male hormone' and/or more 'female hormone' in male homosexuals and vice versa in female homosexuals". However, these findings have been reviewed and have subsequently been dismissed by Gooren as suffering from faulty design and interpretation.

Factors implicated in the development of transsexuality include chromosomal abnormalities, polymorphisms of certain genes, and variations in aromatase (cytochrome P450 CYP19) and CYP17. Girls with congenital adrenal hyperplasia show an increase in probability of transsexuality later in life; however, this probability is still only 1–3% in CAH. Although historically abnormal sexual differentiation has pointed to androgens as a causal factor, there are codeterminants of gender identity and sexual orientation. These factors are currently unknown, and thus no clear cut answer for the cause of transsexualism and homosexuality exists.

Due to relatively small population sizes, generalizability of studies on transsexuality cannot be assumed.

=== Isolated GRH Deficiency ===
Isolated GRH deficiency (IGD, also known as isolated or idiopathic hypogonadotropic hypogonadism, IHH) also provides evidence of the influence of estrogen on androphilia. Shirazi et al. found that women with IGD reported lower male attraction than typical females. However, IGD did not lead to a complete decrease in attraction to males, possible leading to an elevated proportion of participants with IGD to identify as bisexual in comparison to unaffected females. IGD did not directly decrease libido or other sexual desire. Males with IGD did not differ in sexual orientation from typical males.

== Endocrine disruptors ==
Endocrine disrupting chemicals (EDCs) are chemicals that, at certain doses, can interfere with the endocrine system in mammals. Work on possible neurotoxic effects of endocrine disruptors, and their possible effects on sexual orientation when a fetus is exposed to them, is in its infancy: "we mostly know about the relationship between EDC exposure and neurobehavioral function through an examination of outcomes within a limited sphere of questions." While studies have found that xenoestrogens and xenoandrogens can alter the brain's sexual differentiation in a number of species used as animal models, from the data in hand to date, it is "misleading ...to expect EDCs to produce profiles of effects, such as sexually dimorphic behaviors, as literal copies of those produced by native hormones. Such agents are not hormones. They should not be expected to act precisely as hormones."

== See also ==
- Biology and sexual orientation
- Environment and sexual orientation
- Fraternal birth order and male sexual orientation
- Handedness and sexual orientation
- Genetics of gender
- David Reimer
- Epigenetic theories of homosexuality
