= Justin Lehmiller =

American social psychologist and author

Justin J. Lehmiller
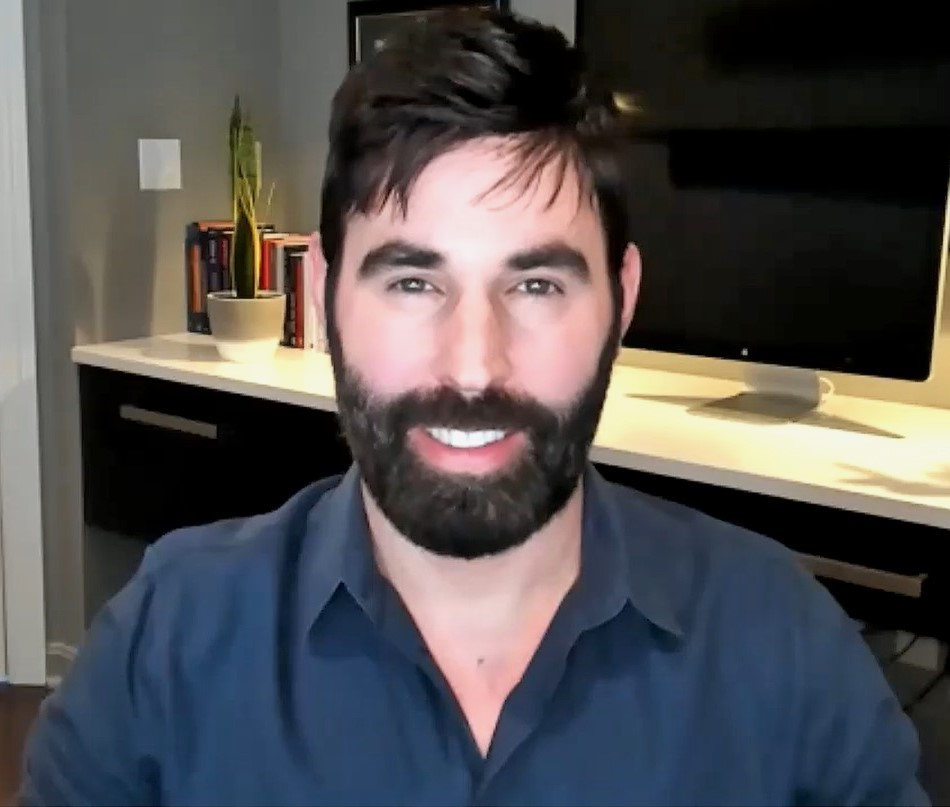
- Lehmiller in 2021
- Education: BA, MA, PhD
- Alma mater: Gannon University; Villanova University; Purdue University
- Known for: Sexual fantasy research
- Website: lehmiller.com

Justin J. Lehmiller is an American social psychologist and author. He is a research fellow at the Kinsey Institute at Indiana University.

Lehmiller has authored books such as Tell Me What You Want: The Science of Sexual Desire and How It Can Help You Improve Your Sex Life and The Psychology of Human Sexuality. He has appeared on several television programs to discuss his research and the science of sex. He maintains the Sex and Psychology blog and podcast.

== Biography ==
Lehmiller is from Canton, Ohio. He attended college at Gannon University, earning a B.A. in psychology in 2001. In 2003, he graduated from Villanova University with a M.S. in experimental psychology. In 2008, he received his doctorate in social psychology from Purdue University. Lehmiller began his academic career as an assistant professor in the Department of Psychology at Colorado State University (2008–2011). Following that, he served as a College Fellow in the Department of Psychology at Harvard University (2011–2014) and as the director of the Social Psychology Graduate Program at Ball State University (2015–2018).

Lehmiller's book Tell Me What You Want was published by Da Capo Press in 2018. The book is based on the largest-ever survey of sexual fantasies in the United States. Lehmiller's survey of 4,175 Americans offers insight into what Americans are fantasizing about, where people's sexual fantasies come from and what they say about an individual, and how to communicate about fantasies with a partner. In January 2020, Lehmiller appeared on an episode of the Netflix series Sex, Explained, in which he discussed some of the main findings from his book.

Lehmiller collaborated with advice columnist, Dan Savage, to study gay men's cuckolding fantasies, publishing the findings in the Archives of Sexual Behavior, a peer-reviewed journal for research on sexuality. He has also published on sexual fantasies, consensual non-monogamy, marginalized relationships, and friends with benefits.

Lehmiller is a consulting editor at The Journal of Sex Research and an elected member of the International Academy of Sex Research.

Lehmiller has appeared on several television programs to discuss his research and the science of sex, including Dr. Phil, Sex Before the Internet, and National Geographic's Taboo. He maintains the Sex and Psychology blog and podcast.

== Other works ==
- Harman, J. J., & Lehmiller, J. J. (2014). A Social Psychology Research Experience (2nd ed.). San Diego, CA: Cognella. ISBN 1626610266
- Lehmiller, J. J., & Agnew, C. R. (2006). Marginalized relationships: The impact of social disapproval on romantic relationship commitment. Personality and Social Psychology Bulletin, 32, 40–51.
- Lehmiller, J. J., & Agnew, C. R. (2007). Perceived marginalization and the prediction of romantic relationship stability. Journal of Marriage and Family, 69, 1036–1049.
- Lehmiller, J. J. (2009). Secret romantic relationships: Consequences for personal and relational well-being. Personality and Social Psychology Bulletin, 35, 1452–1466.
- Lehmiller, J. J., VanderDrift, L. E., & Kelly J. R. (2011). Sex differences in approaching friends with benefits relationships. Journal of Sex Research, 48, 275–284.
- Lehmiller, J. J. (2012). Perceived marginalization and its association with physical and psychological health. Journal of Social and Personal Relationships, 29, 451–469.
- Lehmiller, J. J., VanderDrift, L. E., & Kelly, J. R. (2014). Sexual communication, satisfaction, and condom use behavior in friends with benefits and romantic partners. Journal of Sex Research, 51, 74–85.
- Lehmiller, J. J., & Ioerger, M. (2014). Social networking smartphone applications and sexual health outcomes among men who have sex with men. PLoS ONE, 9(1): e86603. doi:10.1371/journal.pone.0086603
- Lehmiller, J. J. (2015). A comparison of sexual health history and outcomes among monogamous and consensually non-monogamous sexual partners. The Journal of Sexual Medicine, 12, 2022–2028. doi:10.1111/jsm.12987
- Balzarini, R. N., Campbell, L., Holmes, B. M., Lehmiller, J. J., Harman, J. J., & Atkins, N. (2017). Perceptions of romantic partners in polyamorous relationships. PLoS ONE, 12(5): e0177841. doi:10.1371/journal.pone.0177841
- Lehmiller, J.J. (2019). The importance of studying consent and consent violations in collective sex environments. Archives of Sexual Behavior, 48, 47-50. doi:10.1007/s10508-018-1238-z
- Balzarini, R.N., Dharma, C., Kohut, T., Holmes, B.M., Campbell, L., Lehmiller, J.J., & Harman, J.J. (2019). Demographic comparison of American polyamorous and monogamous individuals from two online convenience samples. Journal of Sex Research, 56, 681-694. doi:10.1080/00224499.2018.1474333
- Balzarini, R.N., Dharma, C., Kohut, T., Campbell, L., Lehmiller, J.J., Harman, J.J., & Holmes, B.M. (2019). Comparing relationship quality across different types of romantic partners in polyamorous and monogamous relationships. Archives of Sexual Behavior, 48, 1749–1767. doi:10.1007/s/10508-019-1416-7
- Machia, L.V., Proulx, M.L., Ioeger, M. & Lehmiller, J. J. (2020). A longitudinal study of friends with benefits relationships. Personal Relationships, 27, 47-60. doi:10.1111/pere.12307
- Lehmiller, J.J., Garcia, J.R., Gesselman, A.N. & Mark, K.M. (2020). Less sex, but more sexual diversity: Changes in sexual behavior during the COVID-19 coronavirus pandemic. Leisure Sciences. doi:10.1080/01490400.2020.1774016
- Lehmiller, J.J. (2020). Fantasies about consensual nonmonogamy among persons in monogamous romantic relationships. Archives of Sexual Behavior, 49, 2799–2812. doi:10.1007/s10508-020-01788-7
- Thompson, A.E., Cipriano, A.E., Kirkeby, K.M., Wilder, D., & Lehmiller, J.J. (2021). Exploring variation in North American adults' attitudes, interest, experience, and outcomes related to mixed-gender threesomes: A replication and extension. Archives of Sexual Behavior, 50, 1433-1448. doi:10.1007/s10508-020-01829-1
- Lehmiller, J.J. & Gormezano A.M. (2023). Sexual fantasy research: A contemporary review. Current Opinion in Psychology, 49, 101496. doi.org/10.1016/j.copsyc.2022.101496
