= Fraternal birth order and male sexual orientation =

Theory of sexual orientation

The fraternal birth order effect is an observation that the more older brothers a male has from the same mother, the greater probability he will have a homosexual orientation. It was identified by Ray Blanchard and Anthony Bogaert in the 1990s, who attributed the effect to a prenatal biological mechanism, as the association is only present in men with older biological brothers, and not present among men with older step-brothers. Hypothesized to be the result of a maternal immune response to male fetuses, whereby antibodies neutralize male Y-proteins thought to play a role in sexual differentiation during development, it would leave some regions of the male brain in the 'female typical' arrangement – resulting in attraction to males.

== Overview ==
The fraternal birth order effect has been described by one of its proponents as "the most consistent biodemographic correlate of sexual orientation in men". In 1958, it was reported that homosexual men tend to have a greater number of older siblings (i.e., a 'later/higher birth order') than comparable heterosexual men and in 1962, these findings were published in detail. In 1996, Ray Blanchard and Anthony Bogaert claimed that the later birth order of homosexual men was solely due to a number of older brothers and not older sisters. They also found that each older brother increased the odds of homosexuality in a later-born brother by 33%. Later the same year, Blanchard and Bogaert reported the older brother effect in the Kinsey Interview Data, a "very large and historically significant data base". In a study published in 1998, Blanchard called this phenomenon the fraternal birth order effect.

Research over the years has established several facts. First, homosexual men do tend to have a higher birth order than heterosexual men, and this higher birth order is attributed to homosexual men having greater number of older brothers. According to several studies, each older brother increases a male child's naturally occurring odds of having a homosexual orientation by 28–48%. (Note: The naturally occurring odds of a male child (with no older brothers) being homosexual are estimated to be 2%. Due to the fraternal birth order effect, those naturally occurring odds are increased to 2.6% in a male child with one older brother; a male child with two older brothers will have a 3.5% chance of being homosexual; with three, and four older brothers, the chances are increased to 4.6%, and 6.0%, respectively.) However, the numbers of older sisters, younger brothers, and younger sisters is more controversial. Some studies have found that siblings other than male older siblings have no effect on those odds. More recent studies report more equivocal results. One 2002 study estimated that approximately one in seven homosexual males owes their sexual orientation to the fraternal birth order effect. For many years, research seemed to indicate there was no effect of birth order on sexual orientation in women. However, a large population-based study of the phenomenon in the Netherlands revealed the effect was found in women as well.

Secondly, some researchers believe that fraternal birth order effect operates through a biological mechanism during prenatal life, not during childhood or adolescence. Some evidence for this is the fact that the fraternal birth order effect has been found even in males not raised with their biological brothers, and preliminary biochemical evidence was found in a lab study in 2017. It has been determined that biological brothers increase the odds of homosexuality in later-born males even if they were reared in different households, whereas non-biological siblings, such as step-brothers or adopted brothers, have no effect on male sexual orientation. Indirect evidence also indicates that the fraternal birth order effect is prenatal and biological in nature rather than postnatal and psychosocial: The fraternal birth order effect has been confirmed to interact with handedness, as the incidence of homosexuality correlated with an increase in older brothers is seen only in right-handed males. Since handedness develops prenatally, this finding might indicate that prenatal mechanisms underlie the fraternal birth order effect. It has also been found that homosexual males with older brothers have significantly lower birth weights compared to heterosexual males with older brothers. As birth weight is undeniably prenatally determined, it might indicate that a common developmental factor that operates before birth necessarily underlies the fraternal birth order effect and male sexual orientation.

Thirdly, the fraternal birth order effect has been observed in diverse samples such as homosexual males from different ethnicities, different cultures, different historical eras, and widely separated geographic regions. The fraternal birth order effect has been observed in places such as Brazil, Canada, Finland, Iran, Italy, The Netherlands, Samoa, Spain, Turkey, the United Kingdom, and the United States. The effect has also been observed in homosexual men from convenience and representative, national probability samples.

In a 2017 study, researchers found an association between a maternal immune response to neuroligin 4 Y-linked protein (NLGN4Y) and subsequent sexual orientation in their sons. NLGN4Y is important in male brain development; the maternal immune reaction to it, in the form of anti-NLGN4Y antibodies, is thought to alter the brain structures underlying sexual orientation in the male fetus. The study found that women had significantly higher anti-NLGN4Y levels than men. The result also indicates that mothers of gay sons, particularly those with older brothers, had significantly higher anti-NLGN4Y levels than did the control samples of women, including mothers of heterosexual sons.

== Empirical findings ==
=== Biodemographics ===
The fraternal birth order effect is a phenomenon that can be described in one of two ways: Older brothers increase the odds of homosexuality in later-born males or, alternatively, homosexual men tend to have more older brothers than do heterosexual men. It has been found that the proportion of older brothers (i.e., (Older Brothers)/(All Siblings)) is 31% greater in the sibships of homosexual males than in the sibships of heterosexual males. Alternatively, the ratio of older brothers to other siblings (i.e., (Older Brothers)/(Other Siblings)) is 47% greater for homosexual males than it is for heterosexual males.

After statistically controlling for number of older brothers, homosexual and heterosexual males do not differ in their mean number of older sisters, younger sisters or younger brothers. Older sisters, younger sisters, and younger brothers have no effect on the odds of homosexuality in later born males – they neither enhance nor counteract the fraternal birth order effect. Blanchard and Bogaert (1996) investigated whether homosexual men have a higher mean birth order than heterosexual men primarily because they have more older brothers or because they have more older siblings of both sexes (i.e., both older brothers and older sisters). They confirmed that homosexuality was positively correlated with a man's number of older brothers, not older sisters, younger sisters, or younger brothers.

In a few studies, homosexual subjects have occasionally displayed both a larger number of older brothers and a larger number of older sisters in comparison to heterosexual men. This is because a person's number of older brothers and number of older sisters tend to be positively correlated. So, if Proband A has more older brothers than Proband B, chances are that Proband A also has more older sisters than Proband B. These findings of excess of older sisters are hence occasional by-products of homosexual men having an excess of older brothers, are not found as consistently as the excess of older brothers, and thus need not detract from the significance of the fraternal birth order effect. When samples are drawn from populations with relatively high fertility rates, the positive correlation between number of older brothers and older sisters may give the false impression that both the number of older brothers and the number of older sisters are associated with male sexual orientation. Indeed, two samples from the high fertility Samoan population displayed simultaneous fraternal and 'sororal' birth order effects. However, direct comparison of the magnitudes of these two effects showed that the fraternal birth order effect took precedence in the studies. Various studies and meta-analyses have confirmed that only the older brother effect is consistently associated with homosexuality:

- A 1998 meta-analysis by Jones and Blanchard investigated whether older sisters have no effect on sexual orientation in later-born males, or simply a weaker effect than older brothers. To this end, they developed competing mathematical models of the two possibilities: they derived two theoretical equations; the first equation applies if sisters have no direct relation to a proband's sexual orientation but brothers do; the second applies if sisters have the same relation to a proband's sexual orientation as do brothers (including no relation). They then compared the fit of these models to the empirical data available at that time and found that the first equation held for homosexual men and the second for heterosexual men. They also concluded that any tendency for homosexual males to be born later among their sisters is, in effect, a statistical artifact of their tendency to be born later among their brothers.
- A 2004 meta-analysis involved 10,143 male subjects of which 3181 were homosexual and 6962 were heterosexual. Its results reinforced the conclusion that homosexual men tend to have more older brothers than do heterosexual men, and the conclusion that differences in all other sibship parameters (older sisters, younger sisters, or younger brothers) are secondary consequences of the difference in older brothers. The same conclusions have been reached with analyses of individual rather than aggregate data, and by independent investigators.
- A 2015 meta-analysis determined that only the older brother effect/fraternal birth order effect was reliably associated with male sexual orientation across previously published studies.
- A 2020 re-analysis that replicated the FBO effect but took family size and other previous constraints into account further confirmed Blanchard's findings.

The fraternal birth order effect is independent of some potential confounding factors such as age, year of birth, and socioeconomic status. It has also been found that the fraternal birth order effect can be demonstrated whether the homosexual and heterosexual groups being compared on older brothers both have large or small family sizes, so long as both groups have the same family size (or can be adjusted to simulate that condition). Family size differs per country but the implication is that the larger a family size becomes the greater the commonality for homosexuality among men becomes. Additionally, to detect the fraternal birth order effect, it is necessary that family size of homosexual and heterosexual groups are not strongly affected by the various parental strategies (so-called 'stopping rules') of ceasing reproduction after one child, after one male child, or after a child of each sex, because in these particular situations, neither homosexual nor heterosexual males have enough older brothers to make comparisons meaningful. For example, a study done in mainland China did not find any fraternal birth order effect, which the authors attributed to the one-child policy.

The relation between number of older brothers and male homosexuality is not an artifact of higher maternal or paternal age at the time of the proband's birth. This implies that the birth order phenomenon cannot be explained by increased mutation rates in the ova or sperm cells of aging mothers or fathers, respectively.

The relation between number of older brothers and male homosexuality is also not an artifact of birth interval. Blanchard and Bogaert (1997) conducted a study to investigate whether homosexual men are, on average, born a shorter time after their next-older siblings than are heterosexual men. They found that mean birth intervals preceding heterosexual and homosexual males were virtually identical.

No type of sibling (i.e., older brothers, older sisters, younger brothers or younger sisters) is reliably related to women's sexual orientation.

=== Quantitative findings ===
Research on the fraternal birth order effect has shown that for every older brother a male child has, there is a 33% increase in the naturally occurring odds of the male child being homosexual. The naturally occurring odds of a male child (without any older brothers) being homosexual are estimated to be 2%. (Note: This proved to be a close estimation by Cantor et al. (2002) as a subsequent study, Blanchard and Bogaert (2004), found that the observed prevalence of homosexuality among males with no older brothers was 2.18%.) Thus, if a male with no older brothers has a 2% chance of being homosexual and the fraternal birth order effect increases those chances by 33% for each older brother, then a male with one older brother has a 2.6% chance of being homosexual; a male with two older brothers has a 3.5% chance, and males with three and four older brothers have a 4.6%, and 6.0% chance, respectively.

Estimates of the proportion of homosexual men who owe their sexual orientation to the fraternal birth order effect have ranged from 15.1% to 28.6%. Cantor et al. (2002) found that 0% of homosexual men with no older brothers, 24% of homosexual men with one older brother, 43% of homosexual men with two older brothers, and so on, can attribute their homosexual orientation to the fraternal birth order effect. They also showed that the effect of fraternal birth order would exceed all other causes of homosexuality combined in groups of gay men with 3 or more older brothers and would precisely equal all other causes combined in a theoretical group with 2.5 older brothers.

=== Timing of the fraternal birth order mechanism ===
Both direct and indirect evidence have demonstrated that the mechanism by which the fraternal birth order effect operates is prenatal in timing and biological in nature, rather than postnatal in timing or psychosocial in nature. Indirect evidence was found first when it was discovered that the fraternal birth order effect interacts with birth weight. Then, Bogaert (2006) produced direct evidence that the fraternal birth order mechanism is prenatal. Subsequent research related to handedness has further reinforced these findings. Evidence that the fraternal birth order effect reflects events during prenatal life is generally consistent with a lack of evidence that it reflects events during postnatal life.

==== Birth weight ====
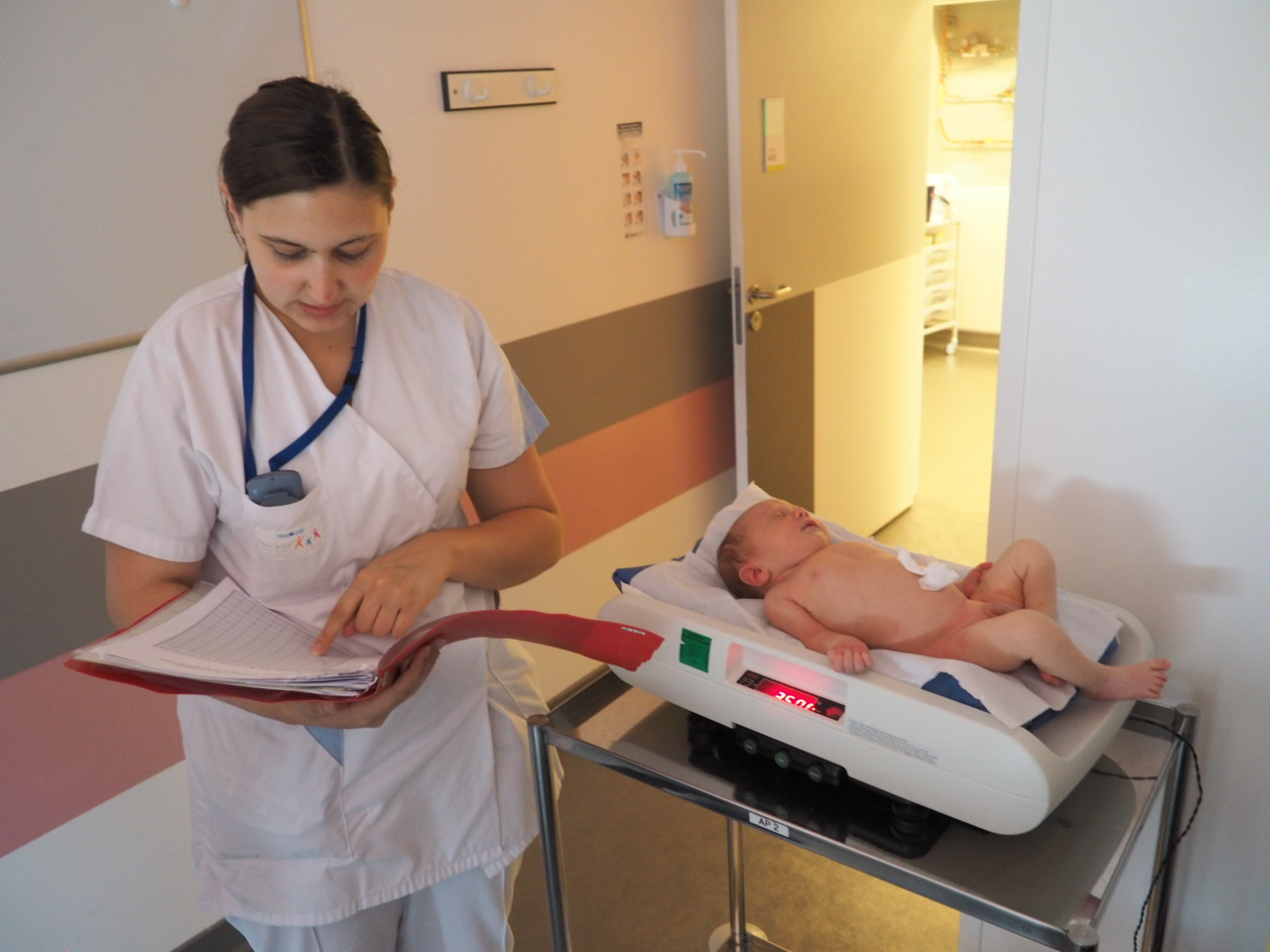
A newborn being weighed after birth. Birth weight is the body weight of a baby at birth.

Blanchard and Ellis (2001) studied 3229 adult, homosexual and heterosexual, men and women (the probands) whose mothers knew the sex of every child (or fetus) that they were pregnant with prior to the proband. Information on birth weight, maternal gravidity, and other demographic variables was reported on questionnaires completed by the probands' mothers. The study yielded three main observations:

1. The heterosexual males with older brothers weighed less at birth than the heterosexual males with older sisters;
2. The homosexual males with older brothers weighed less than the heterosexual males with older brothers, and:
3. The homosexual and heterosexual males with no older siblings, or older sisters only, did not differ in birth weight.

Each of these three findings has since been replicated in other studies (and the general finding that boys with older brothers have smaller birth weights than boys with older sisters is in line with earlier studies). These findings suggest that prior male pregnancies influence the development of subsequent male fetuses; that this influence is felt to varying degrees by individual fetuses; and that those fetuses who are most strongly affected by this process, as indicated by their comparatively lower birth weights, are also those most likely to be homosexual. The interaction of fraternal birth order with birth weight (an obviously prenatally determined trait) suggests that the mechanism of the fraternal birth order effect operates before the individual's birth (i.e., in utero). It also shows that, even at the time of birth, there is a physical marker of sexual orientation (i.e., birth weight) that is related to the number of older brothers.

==== Handedness ====
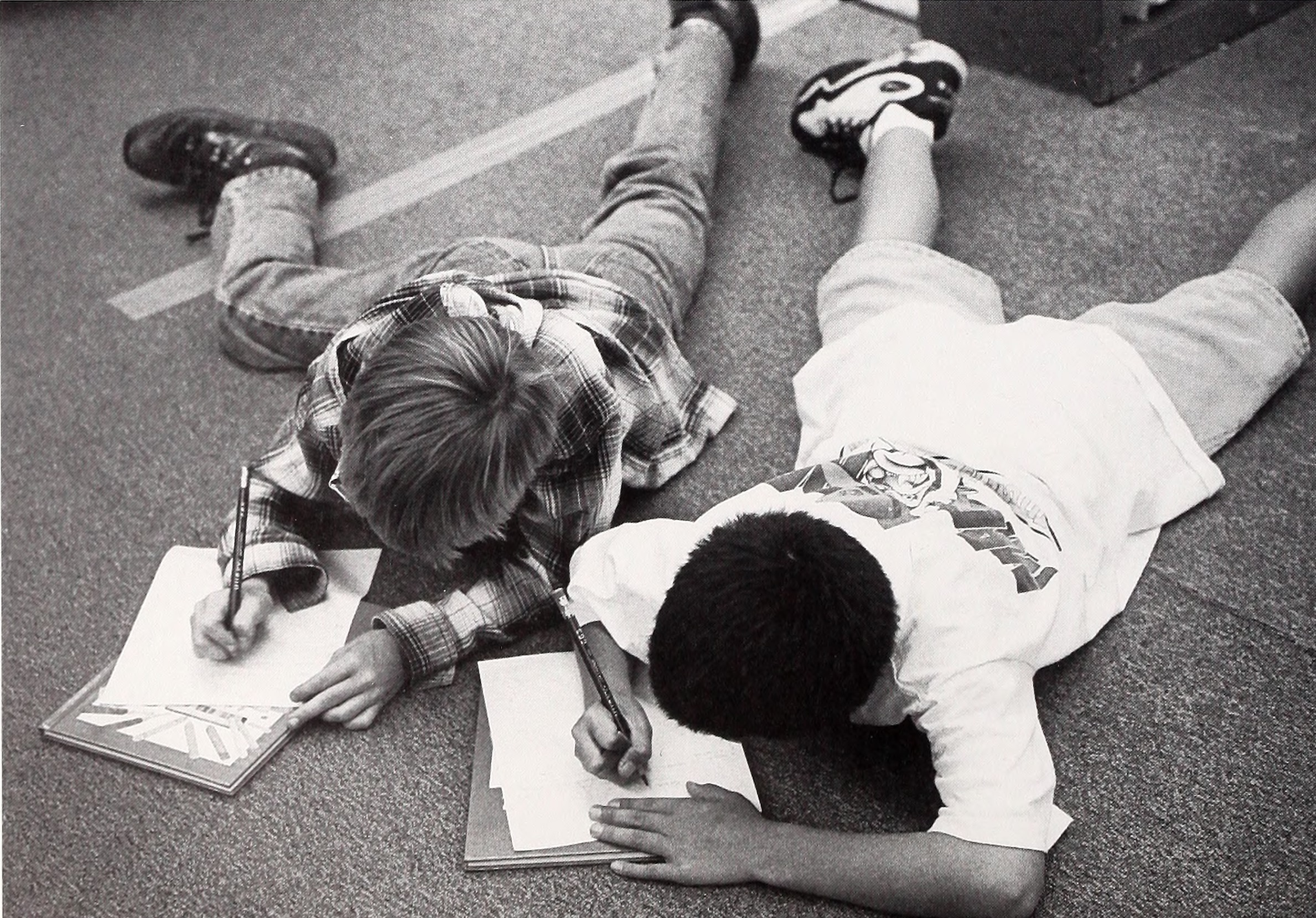
Two boys use their right hands to write. Handedness is the tendency to be more skilled at performing tasks with one hand than the other. The fraternal birth order effect increases the likelihood of homosexuality only in right-handed males.

Blanchard et al. (2006) produced indirect evidence that the fraternal birth order effect is biological rather than psychosocial in nature: They found, in a sample of 3146 men, that the fraternal birth order effect was contingent on handedness: The effect of older brothers on the likelihood of homosexuality only occurred in right-handed males; the effect of older brothers did not alter the likelihood of being gay or bisexual in left-handed and ambidextrous men. Later, another study found the fraternal birth order effect may be limited to only moderately right-handed men, as extreme right-handers also did not display a fraternal birth order effect. The finding that fraternal birth order interacts with handedness has been confirmed by subsequent research. As handedness is developed during prenatal life, this suggests that a prenatal mechanism causes increased homosexuality in right-handed male fetuses with older brothers.

=== Mechanism ===
In a 2017 study, researchers found an association between a maternal immune response to neuroligin 4 Y-linked protein (NLGN4Y) and subsequent sexual orientation in their sons. NLGN4Y is important in male brain development; maternal immune reaction to it, in the form of anti-NLGN4Y antibodies, is thought to alter the brain structures underlying sexual orientation in the male fetus. The study found that women had significantly higher anti-NLGN4Y levels than men. The result also indicates that mothers of gay sons, particularly those with older brothers, had significantly higher anti-NLGN4Y levels than did the control samples of women, including mothers of heterosexual sons.

==== Biological vs. non-biological older brothers ====
A 2006 study published by Bogaert examined the association between male sexual orientation and biological siblings (i.e., born from the same mother) and non-biological siblings (i.e., adoptive siblings, step-siblings or paternal half-siblings), finding that only biological older brothers predicted sexual orientation, pointing to a biological rather than social effect. The study also found that the length of time brothers were reared together did not predict sexual orientation, which Bogaert interpreted as pointing to a prenatal rather than postnatal effect. Boegart suggested that the fraternal birth order effect is the result of the mother's body's "memory" for both male births as well as male gestations (i.e., every instance of being pregnant with a male fetus).

=== Ubiquity ===
The existence of the fraternal birth order effect on male sexual orientation has been confirmed many times. One approach for establishing the ubiquity of this effect has been to search for it in a variety of sample types. The repeated finding of the fraternal birth order effect in diverse samples shows that the effect is nearly ubiquitous – with the exception of populations where people do not have older brothers.

The fraternal birth order effect has been found in homosexual males from different ethnicities, including White, Black, Hispanic, East Indian, Asian, Middle Eastern and Polynesian. The effect has also been found in homosexual males from different historical eras, ranging from participants examined in recent years to participants examined decades ago.

The effect has also been demonstrated in homosexual males from different cultures: Despite how variable cultures can be, cross-cultural universals in the development of homosexual males appear to exist. For example, in Western cultures, homosexual males exhibit comparatively more gender-nonconforming behavior during childhood than heterosexual males. Retrospective studies conducted in Brazil, Guatemala, Independent Samoa, the Philippines, Thailand, and Turkey have found that the same is true of homosexual males raised in these non-Western cultures. According to VanderLaan et al., cross-cultural similarities in childhood behavior support the idea that similar biological influences, which transcend cultural differences, play a role in the development of male homosexuality. This idea would be further supported if it could be demonstrated that causal biological factors, such as the fraternal birth order mechanism (which is biological in nature), are likely to influence the development of male homosexuality in non-Western cultures. Thus, establishing the existence of the fraternal birth order effect — a hypothesized outcome of the fraternal birth order mechanism — in a non-Western culture would further substantiate arguments that similar biological influences underlie the development of homosexuality across cultures. Studies in Western as well as non-Western cultures have demonstrated fraternal birth order effect (as well as fecundity effects) in relation to male homosexuality. The cross-cultural consistency with which these effects have been documented is consistent with the conclusion that culturally invariant, biological processes underlie the development of homosexuality in males.

The fraternal birth order effect has also been recorded in studies in widely separated geographic regions and in countries such as Brazil, Canada, Finland, Iran, Italy, The Netherlands, Independent Samoa, Spain, Turkey, the United Kingdom, and the United States. The effect has additionally been observed in participants examined during childhood as well as adulthood and in patients as well as in non-patient volunteers. The fraternal birth order effect has been demonstrated by Blanchard and colleagues as well as by independent researchers. The demonstration of the fraternal birth order effect in meta-analysis of studies by Blanchard and colleagues, meta-analysis of studies by independent investigators and studies by both Blanchard and other investigators shows that studies of the fraternal birth order effect have been free from experimenter bias. The effect has also been demonstrated in homosexual men from convenience samples and in representative, national probability samples.

Three studies have investigated whether sexual orientation also correlates with fraternal birth order in men attracted to physically immature males. One study (Bogaert et al., 1997) found that homosexual-bisexual male pedophiles had a later general birth order than heterosexual male pedophiles and this late birth order was primarily due to the homosexual-bisexual group being born later among their brothers than later among their sisters. Another study (Blanchard and Bogaert, 1998) did not confirm a later fraternal birth order for men with sexual offenses against prepubescent boys or girls, but did confirm it for men with offenses against pubescent boys or girls. The inconsistency of these findings regarding the correlation of sexual orientation and fraternal birth order in pedophiles may be related to methodological problems in the two studies. The first study was a retrospective study of sex offenders, which included only those subjects whose clinical charts happened to contain birth order data so the results of the study may have been affected by selection bias. The second study was a reanalysis of archived data from a classic study of sexual offenders from the year 1965. There was minimal recoverable information regarding the subjects' offense histories, and there is a possibility that the sexual preferences of the pedophiles in the study were not accurately classified from the available information.

Blanchard et al. (2000) therefore conducted a study in which data were collected with the specific purpose of examining the relation of fraternal birth order to sexual orientation in homosexual, bisexual and heterosexual pedophiles. Each type of pedophilic group was compared with a control group that consisted of gynephilic men (i.e., men attracted to adult females). The study found that homosexual pedophiles had more older brothers than the gynephilic control group while the bisexual and heterosexual pedophiles did not. These results confirm that fraternal birth order correlates with sexual orientation in pedophiles, as it does in teleiophiles (i.e., people exclusively attracted to adults). The results also confirm that fraternal birth order does not correlate with pedophilia per se: Previous studies had established that the fraternal birth order effect affects what gender a man is sexually attracted to; Blanchard et al. (2000) additionally investigated if fraternal birth order also affects the age of persons to whom a man is attracted. Results from the study indicate that fraternal birth order does not affect the age of preferred erotic targets and that fraternal birth order does not correlate with pedophilia. So the fraternal birth order mechanism only causes males to be attracted to other males; whatever mechanism causes males to be pedophilic as opposed to teleiophilic (i.e., attracted to adults) is different from the fraternal birth order mechanism itself.

Other than fraternal birth order, no common feature has been identified in the developmental histories or family demographics of androphiles and pedophiles, while key features distinguish the two groups, for example, most androphilic males display gender non-conformity during childhood whereas same-sex attracted pedophiles do not. To prevent misunderstanding or misuse of their studies on fraternal birth order in pedophiles, researchers have stressed that any conclusion that homosexual pedophilia shares an etiological factor with androphilia does not imply that ordinary homosexual men (androphiles) are likely to molest boys, any more than the conclusion that heterosexual pedophilia shares an etiological factor with gynephilia would imply that ordinary heterosexual men (gynephiles) are likely to molest girls.

The finding of the fraternal birth order effect in cisgender and transgender male androphiles, men attracted to boys and those attracted to adult men—same-sex attracted groups who differ as widely as possible in their own characteristics and in the characteristics of their desired partners—would suggest that fraternal birth order (or the underlying variable it reflects) may be the first universal factor to be identified in development of same-sex attraction in males.

=== Asexuality ===
A 2014 Internet study attempted to analyze the relationship between self-identification as asexual, birth order and other biological markers, in comparison to individuals of other sexual orientation groups. A total of 325 asexuals (60 men and 265 women), 690 heterosexuals (190 men and 500 women), and 268 non-heterosexuals (64 men and 204 women) completed online questionnaires. The study asserts that the effect of older brothers on sexual orientation is true for right-handed men only and extends these findings to asexual men.

=== Other findings ===
Bearman and Brückner (2002) argued that studies showing a fraternal birth order effect have used nonrepresentative samples and/or indirect reports on siblings' sexual orientation. Their analysis, focusing on opposite-sex twins, did not find an association "between same-sex attraction and number of older siblings, older brothers, or older sisters". A study by Francis (2008), using the same Add Health survey but with broader analysis, saw a very weak correlation of male same-sex attraction with having multiple older brothers (but did find a significant negative correlation of male same-sex attraction with having older sisters i.e., those who experienced a non-zero level of same-sex attraction were significantly less likely to have older sisters).

According to VanderLaan et al., the failure of these studies to demonstrate the fraternal birth order effect is attributable to their methodological flaws. Although they utilized large adolescent samples, the low base rates of same-sex attraction and behaviour in the population resulted in sample sizes that were too small for assessing the relation of birth order to sexual orientation. The fraternal birth order effect may also have been obscured in these studies due to their use of different methods of sexual orientation classification and their imprecise measures of sibships. Ray Blanchard explained that the demonstrability of the fraternal birth order effect depends partly on the adequate matching of the mean family size of the homosexual and heterosexual study groups and noted that in the two studies above, the mean family size of the homosexual groups was significantly smaller than that of the heterosexual comparison groups. (Note: According to Ray Blanchard, the demonstrability of the fraternal birth order effect partly depends upon proper matching of homosexual and heterosexual study groups with respect to mean family size. If the homosexual study group has too few siblings, in comparison to the heterosexual study group, the homosexual group will tend to show no difference in number of older brothers and may show a scarcity of other sibling types (most commonly younger brothers and younger sisters). If the homosexual study group has too many siblings, it will not only show the expected excess of older brothers but may also show an excess of other sibling types (most commonly older sisters). In his three-part article, Blanchard first demonstrated the aforementioned outcomes using purposely mismatched groups selected from archived data sets. In the second part, Blanchard presented two different methods for transforming raw sibling data. Both methods intended to "produce family-size-corrected variables for each of the four original sibling parameters (older brothers, older sisters, younger brothers, and younger sisters)." Consequently, both methods were successful in demonstrating the fraternal birth order effect in the purposely mismatched groups. In the third part of the article, Blanchard surveyed studies about fraternal birth order and found two studies that did not demonstrate the fraternal birth order effect in their homosexual groups. In both studies, the collective findings for older sisters, younger brothers, and younger sisters as well as individual findings for the four sibling classes suggested that mean family size of the homosexual study groups was comparatively smaller to that of the heterosexual groups in both studies.) Specifically, heterosexual males had larger numbers of siblings overall than the homosexual males which may have obscured the analyses of group differences in older brothers and prevented the demonstration of the fraternal birth order effect. Researchers have thus emphasized the necessity of comparing groups on measures of mean family size and have suggested that, in the two studies, an alternative birth order metric that controlled for sibship size would have produced findings consistent with the fraternal birth order effect. Since the publication of Bearman and Bruckner's study in 2002, studies that used representative national probability samples and direct reports on siblings' sexual orientation have found the fraternal birth order effect.

Currin et al. (2015) carried out a study investigating the existence of the fraternal birth order effect in a variety of sexual orientation dimensions – namely, identity, attraction, fantasies, and behavior – whereas previous research studied only one such dimension (identity). Participants in the study were split into two groups: a "heterosexual group" and a "non-heterosexual" group. To determine what label participants used to identify their sexual orientation, participants were asked, "How would you classify your sexual orientation?" and selected from one of five options (heterosexual, mostly heterosexual, bisexual, mostly gay/lesbian, gay/lesbian). People who selected "heterosexual" were placed in the heterosexual group, whereas people selecting "gay/lesbian" were placed in the non-heterosexual group. To assess sexual attraction, participants were asked, "How sexually attracted are you to men?" and selected from a 7-point Likert scale ranging from 1 (not at all) to 7 (very much). Participants were also asked "How sexually attracted are you to women?" and were presented with the same Likert scale. People who selected 1 (not at all) when answering the same sex sexual attraction question were placed in the heterosexual group. People who selected 2 or greater were placed in the non-heterosexual group.

To assess sexual behavior, participants were asked, "What is the total number of male sexual partners you have had?" and "What is the total number of female sexual partners you have had?" Sexual partner was defined as someone with whom the participant had penile–vaginal penetration, oral sex, anal sex, and/or manual sex. Individuals who identified having any same-sex sexual partner (i.e., 1 or more) were placed in the non-heterosexual group while individuals who did not identify having a same-sex sexual partner were placed in the heterosexual group. To assess sexual fantasy, participants were asked "What percent of your sexual fantasies during masturbation involve men?" and rated the question from 0% to 100%. Each participant was also asked "What percent of your sexual fantasies during masturbation involve women?" and rated the question from 0% to 100%. If an individual endorsed having any same-sex sexual fantasies at all (i.e., 1% or greater), they were placed in the non-heterosexual group, otherwise they were placed in the heterosexual group. Using these criteria for sexual orientation identity, attraction, fantasies, and behavior, Currin et al. (2015) were unable to demonstrate the effect for any dimensions in their sample of 722 right-handed men (of which 500 were classified as heterosexual and 122 were classified as non-heterosexual), although the study did adjust for family size differences between the two groups. A 2017 meta-analysis analyzed studies about the fraternal birth order effect including Currin et al. (2015). The meta-analysis had a total sample of 7140 homosexual males and 12,837 heterosexual males. The results of the meta-analysis confirmed the reliability of the fraternal birth order effect.

Frisch et al. (2006) did not find a correlation between older brothers and same-sex unions between men in a sample of over 2 million Danes. Instead, researchers found a correlation between such unions and having an excess of older sisters. Frisch cautioned that one cannot interpret findings about the correlates of heterosexual and homosexual marriage as if they were findings about the correlates of heterosexual and homosexual orientation. Ray Blanchard performed a reanalysis of Frisch's data using procedures that have been used in prior studies of fraternal birth order. According to his analysis, "the only group whose data resembled data from previous studies was the homosexually married males", reaffirming the birth order effect. He further criticized drawing conclusions from data of married persons, since heterosexually married persons also have "markedly different older-sibling sex ratios" than heterosexually oriented persons.

=== Effect in women ===
Whether or not older brothers increase the probability of women having a non-heterosexual or homosexual orientation is less consistent. Some previous scientific research found older siblings have no impact on the sexuality of women, while others found that older siblings have the same effect on women as on men. Following updates in methodology, some recent studies in large samples have identified effects of older siblings on the sexuality of women quantitatively similar to that of men, as well as one meta-analysis.

Most research on the fraternal birth order effect has been carried out on homosexual men. However, the fraternal birth order effect has been observed in androphilic transgender women (who were assigned male at birth). Trans women who are sexually oriented towards men have a greater number of older brothers than trans women who are sexually interested in women. This has been reported in samples from Western and non-Western countries like Spain and Turkey, but with mixed findings in South Korea.

=== Sororal birth order effect ===
Some research has sought to extend the idea of the 'fraternal birth order' effect to the effect of older sisters on the sexuality of younger siblings, calling it the "sororal birth order effect". These effects have been less consistent, with one 2010 review noting that only 3 studies had identified a sororal birth order effect. According to Semenya et al. 2023, more recent studies have demonstrated the observation of a sororal birth order effect, but whether or not this a byproduct of the fraternal birth order effect, and the mechanism is unclear.

== Theories about the fraternal birth order mechanism ==
Anthony Bogaert's work involving adoptees concludes that the effect is not due to being raised with older brothers, but is hypothesized to have something to do with changes induced in the mother's body when gestating a boy that affects subsequent sons. This is because the effect is present regardless of whether or not the older brothers are raised in the same family environment with the boy. There is no effect when the number of older brothers is increased by adopted brothers or stepbrothers. It has been hypothesized that this is caused by an in-utero maternal alloimmune response, specifically, the mother's immune system becoming sensitized to H-Y antigens involved in the sexual differentiation of male vertebrates, and producing antibodies that attack these antigens. Specifically, maternal antibodies to the neuroligin NLGN4Y protein, Y-chromosome protein important in male fetal brain development, have been found to be involved in the fraternal birth order effect.

== See also ==
- Biology and sexual orientation
- Birth order
- Handedness and sexual orientation
- H-Y antigen
- Neuroligin
- Prenatal hormones and sexual orientation
