= Outline of human sexuality =

Overview of and topical guide to human sexuality

The following outline is provided as an overview of and topical guide to human sexuality:

Human sexuality is the capacity to have erotic experiences and responses. Human sexuality impacts cultural, political, legal and philosophical aspects of life, as well as being widely connected to issues of morality, ethics, theology, spirituality, or religion. It is not, however, directly tied to gender.

== History of human sexuality ==
- By period
  - Sexuality in ancient Rome
    - Homosexuality in ancient Rome
    - Prostitution in ancient Rome
  - Timeline of sexual orientation and medicine
- By region
  - History of sex in India
- By subject
  - By orientation
    - History of bisexuality
    - History of homosexuality
      - History of lesbianism
  - History of masturbation
  - History of prostitution
  - LGBT history
    - History of same-sex unions
  - Sexual revolution
  - History of erotic depictions
    - Golden Age of Porn
  - Feminist Sex Wars

== Types of human sexuality ==
- By sex
  - Male sexuality
  - Female sexuality
- By age
  - Child sexuality
    - Genital play
    - Playing doctor
  - Adolescent sexuality
  - Sexuality in older age
- By region
  - Adolescent sexuality in the United States
  - Sexuality in India
  - Sexuality in Japan
  - Sexuality in South Korea
  - Sexuality in China
  - Sexuality in the Philippines
  - Sexuality in Bangladesh
  - Sexuality in Africa
  - LGBT rights by country or territory

== Sexual orientation ==
- Sexual attraction
  - Androphilia and gynephilia
- Sexual orientation – pattern of sexual attraction.
  - Allosexuality – the ability to experience sexual attraction to other people.
    - Monosexuality – sexual attraction to only one sex or gender.
      - Heterosexuality – sexual attraction to the opposite sex or gender.
      - Homosexuality – sexual attraction to the same sex or gender.
    - Multisexuality – sexual attraction to multiple sexes or genders.
      - Bisexuality – sexual attraction to both the opposite and the same sexes or genders (both heterosexual and homosexual attraction) or to more than one sex or gender.
      - Pansexuality – sexual attraction to people regardless of sex or gender (gender-blind attraction).
      - Polysexuality – sexual attraction to many genders, but not all genders.
  - Asexuality – absence of sexual attraction to other people.
    - Gray asexuality – limited sexual attraction that varies in intensity.
      - Demisexuality – sexual attraction to a person after forming an emotional bond.
      - Aegosexuality – disconnect of the target of sexual arousal from the self.
      - Fictosexuality – sexual attraction to fictional characters.
    - Autosexuality – sexual attraction to oneself.
  - Sexual fluidity – capability of changing one's sexual orientation, sexual identity, or sexual attraction.

== Human sexual activity ==
- Human mating strategies
- Human sexual response cycle
- Psychological aspects

=== Types of sexual activity ===
- Partnered
  - Foreplay
  - Non-penetrative sex
  - Sexual penetration
  - Erotic massage – rubbing all over, with or without oil.
  - Intercrural sex – (interfemoral sex) when one partner places a phallic object or penis between the other partner's thighs.
  - Intergluteal sex – when one partner places a phallic object or penis into the other partner's buttock cleavage or gluteal cleft.
  - Mammary intercourse – when one partner rubs a phallic object or penis between the partner's breasts.
  - Stimulation of nipples – stimulating the nipples, usually orally or manually.
  - Tribadism – vulva-to-vulva rubbing.
  - Frot – penis-to-penis rubbing.
  - Manual sex – stimulation of another person's genitalia by using the hands or fingers.
    - Handjob – manual stimulation of another person's penis.
    - Fingering – manual stimulation of another person's vulva or vagina.
    - Anal fingering – manual stimulation of another person's anus.
  - Oral sex – stimulation of another person's genitalia by using the mouth, lips, tongue, or teeth.
    - Cunnilingus – oral stimulation of another person's vulva.
    - Fellatio – oral stimulation of another person's penis.
    - Anilingus – oral stimulation of another person's anus.
  - Sexual intercourse – usually penetrative sexual activity.
    - Vaginal sex – penetration of one person's vagina with another's penis for sexual stimulation and/or reproduction.
    - Anal sex – penetration of one person's anus with another's penis for sexual stimulation.
- Solo
  - Autoeroticism
    - Sexual fantasy
    - Masturbation – stimulation of one's own genitalia.
      - Manual masturbation – stimulation of one's own genitalia by using the hands or fingers.
        - Fingering – manual stimulation of one's own vulva or vagina.
        - Jerking off/wanking – manual stimulation of one's own penis.
      - Oral masturbation – stimulation of one's own genitalia by using the mouth, lips, tongue, or teeth (only possible for flexible people or contortionists).
        - Autofellatio – oral stimulation of one's own penis.
        - Autocunnilingus – oral stimulation of one's own vulva.
      - Anal masturbation – stimulation of one's own anus.
        - Anal fingering – manual stimulation of one's own anus.
        - Autosodomy – insertion of one's own penis into their anus.
- Other
  - Facial – involves someone ejaculating onto their partner's face.
  - Fisting – insertion of a hand into the vagina or rectum.
  - Footjob – stimulating another person's genitals with the feet.
  - Group sex – sexual activity with more than two people.
  - Irrumatio – when the penis is thrust into someone else's mouth; in contrast to fellatio, where the penis is being actively orally excited by a fellator.
  - Sumata – type of stimulation of male genitals popular in Japanese brothels: the woman rubs the man's penis with her thighs and labia majora.
- Vanilla sex – sexual activity that is considered normal by society.
- Sex toy – object used for sexual stimulation.
  - Dildo
  - Vibrator
  - Anal beads
  - Cock ring
  - Artificial vagina
  - Sex doll
- Sexual roleplay
  - BDSM
  - Bondage and Discipline
  - Dominance and Submission
    - Erotic humiliation
  - Sadism and Masochism
    - Cock-and-ball torture
    - Breast torture
    - Erotic spanking
  - Bondage positions
  - BDSM equipment
- Kink
- Sexual slang
  - Baseball metaphors for sex
- Sex position
- Sexual arousal
  - Touch
    - Erogenous zone
  - Smell
    - Perfume
    - Cologne
  - Sight
    - Romantic setting
    - Nudity
  - Sound
    - Moaning
    - Dirty talk
  - Related
    - Aphrodisiac
    - Libido
    - Sexual fantasy

=== Physiological events ===
- Sexual stimulation
- Sexual arousal
  - Male
    - Penile erection – when the penis becomes engorged and stiff.
  - Female
    - Clitoral erection – when the clitoris becomes engorged.
    - Vaginal lubrication – when the vagina becomes moistened by a natural fluid.
- Orgasm
  - Female ejaculation – expulsion of fluid from the Skene's gland.
  - Male ejaculation – expulsion of semen from the penis.
- Insemination
- Pregnancy

=== Unsorted ===
- Incest – sexual activity between family members.
  - Accidental incest
  - Covert incest
- Mechanics of sex
  - Edging (sexual practice)
  - Erotic sexual denial
  - Forced orgasm
- Sex magic
- Sexual sublimation

== Sexology (science of sex) ==
- Conversion therapy
- Sexuality in older age
- Biology and sexual orientation
- Environment and sexual orientation
- Fraternal birth order and male sexual orientation
- Handedness and sexual orientation
- Neuroscience and sexual orientation
- Paraphilia – sexual attraction towards atypical stimuli.
  - List of paraphilias
    - Pedophilia – adult sexual attraction to prepubescent children.
    - Zoophilia – sexual attraction to non-human animals.
    - Necrophilia – sexual arousal involving dead bodies.
    - Somnophilia – sexual arousal involving sleeping or unconscious people.
    - Frotteurism – sexual attraction from rubbing against a non-consenting person.
    - Voyeurism – spying on people engaging in sexual activity.
    - Coprophilia – sexual arousal involving feces.
    - Urolagnia – sexual arousal involving urine.
    - Objectophilia – sexual attraction to inanimate objects.
    - Exhibitionism – exposing one's intimate areas to unsuspecting and non-consenting people.
    - Sexual sadism disorder – sexual arousal involving inflicting pain on other people.
  - Sexual fetishism – sexual fixation on things or situations that are not inherently sexual.
    - Partialism – sexual attraction to specific body parts.
      - Foot fetishism – sexual attraction to feet.
- Prenatal hormones and sexual orientation
- Sexual orientation hypothesis
- Sexual orientation identity

=== Sex education ===
- Human reproduction
- Body image
- Sexual maturity
- Safe sex
  - Sexually transmitted infection
  - Birth control
  - Condom
  - Dental dam
- Postorgasmic illness syndrome

=== Medicine ===
- Reproductive medicine
  - Andrology
  - Gynaecology
  - Urology
  - Sexual medicine
- Sex therapy
  - Surrogate partner
- Sexual dysfunction
  - Anorgasmia
  - Sexuality after spinal cord injury
  - Hypoactive sexual desire disorder
  - Erectile dysfunction
  - Hypersexuality

== Philosophy of sex ==
- Outline of sexual ethics
- Sexual objectification
- Sexualization
- Pornographication

== Culture ==
=== Legal aspects ===
Sex and the law

- Laws
  - Laws regarding child sexual abuse
    - Laws regarding child pornography
  - Laws regarding rape
  - Laws regarding incest
  - Laws regarding prostitution
- Age of consent
- Criminal transmission of HIV
- Obscenity
- Public indecency
- Sexual misconduct

==== Sexual assault ====
Sexual assault – physical sexual activity with a non-consenting person.

- Rape – sexual intercourse with a non-consenting person.
  - Types
    - Corrective rape
    - Date rape
    - Gang rape
    - Marital rape
    - Serial rape
    - Prison rape
    - Rape by deception
    - War rape
  - Effects and motivations
    - Effects and aftermath of rape
    - Rape trauma syndrome
    - Motivation for rape
    - Sociobiological theories of rape
    - Rape culture
  - Laws
    - Statutory rape
    - Rape shield law
    - False accusation of rape
    - Rape and punishment
    - Rape investigation
    - Rape kit
  - Related
    - History of rape
    - Rape statistics
    - Rape by gender
    - Anti-rape device
    - Rape crisis centre
      - Rape Crisis Centers in the United States
    - Rape pornography
    - Rape and revenge films
    - Rape fantasy
- Sexual harassment
  - Sexual harassment in education
- Sexual abuse
  - Child sexual abuse
    - Child-on-child sexual abuse
  - Religion and Sexual abuse
    - Catholic sex abuse cases
    - Roman Catholic sex abuse cases by country
    - Ecclesiastical response to Catholic sex abuse cases
    - Settlements and bankruptcies in Catholic sex abuse cases
      - Curial response to Catholic sex abuse cases
      - Media coverage of Catholic sex abuse cases
- Sexual violence
  - Sexual violence by intimate partners
  - Factors associated with being a victim of sexual violence

=== Religious aspects ===
Sexuality

Religion and sexuality

- Buddhism
- Christianity and sexuality
  - Catholicism
    - Sex, gender and the Roman Catholic Church
    - Catholic sex abuse cases
      - Roman Catholic sex abuse cases by country
      - Ecclesiastical response to Catholic sex abuse cases
      - Settlements and bankruptcies in Catholic sex abuse cases
      - Curial response to Catholic sex abuse cases
      - Media coverage of Catholic sex abuse cases
  - Sexuality in Christian demonology
- Islam
- Judaism
- Taoism and sexuality

Sexual orientation

- Christianity
- Buddhism
- Islam
- Haitian Vodou
- Hare Krishna movement
- Scientology
- Sikhism
- Unitarian Universalism
- Zoroastrianism

=== Psychological aspects ===
- Psychosexual development
- Sexual attraction
- Sexual fantasy
- Libido
- Lust
- Romantic orientation

=== Economic aspects ===
- Sex industry
  - Adult video game
  - Erotica
  - Pornography – sexually explicit media created for sexual arousal.
    - Cartoon pornography – animated pornography.
      - Hentai – pornographic anime and manga.
  - Sex work
    - Prostitution – sexual activity in exchange for money.
      - Sex tourism – traveling to foreign countries for paid sexual activity.
        - Female sex tourism
        - Child sex tourism
    - Pornographic film actor – a person who stars in pornographic videos.
    - Stripper – a person who performs striptease.
  - Sex museum
  - Sex shop – retailer that sells sexual paraphernalia.
  - Strip club – a venue for strippers.

== Human sexuality organizations ==
- American Institute of Bisexuality
- Arse Elektronika
- BDSM organizations
- Fuck for Forest
- OneTaste
- Sex Addicts Anonymous
- Sex and Love Addicts Anonymous
- Sexaholics Anonymous
- Sexual Compulsives Anonymous
- Society for the Advancement of Sexual Health
- Survivors of Incest Anonymous

== Literature ==
- List of hentai authors
- Non-fiction books about prostitution
- Pornographic books
- Pornographic magazines
- Sex manuals

=== Encyclopedias about sex ===
- Encyclopedia of Motherhood
- Encyclopedia of Unusual Sex Practices
- International Encyclopedia of Sexuality
- Queers in History

== See also ==
- Index of human sexuality articles
- Outline of relationships
- Outline of British pornography
- Animal sexual behaviour
- List of strip clubs
- Sexuality in Star Trek
- Sexuality in music videos
- Sexual slang
- African-American culture and sexual orientation
- Ego-dystonic sexual orientation
- Sexual orientation and gender identity at the United Nations
- Sexual orientation and military service
- Sociosexual orientation
- Coitus reservatus
- Eroto-comatose lucidity
- Emergency contraceptive availability by country
- Unsimulated sex in film
- Family planning
- Marriage
- Paraphilia
- Polyamory
- Promiscuity
- Prostitutes and courtesans
- Romance (love)
- Sexual abstinence
- Sexual addiction
- Sexual capital
- Sexual inhibition
- Sexual slavery
