= Human sexuality =

Form in which people experience and express themselves sexually

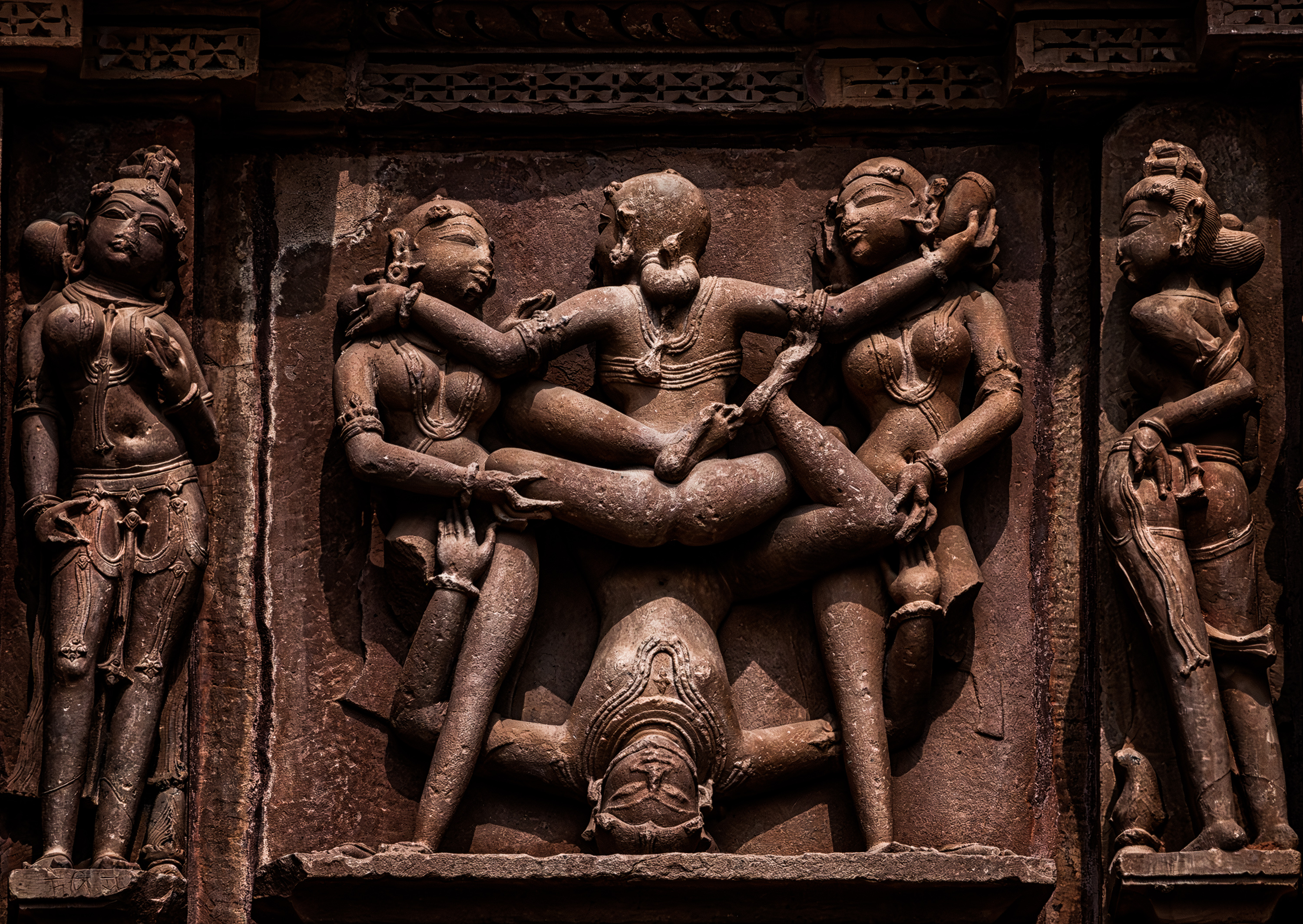
Erotic Kama sculptures depicting human sexuality

Sexuality is the way people experience and express themselves through sexual activities. This involves biological, psychological, physical, erotic, emotional, social, and spiritual feelings and behaviors. Because it is a broad term which has varied within different historical contexts, it lacks a precise definition. The biological and physical aspects of sexuality largely concern the human reproductive functions, including the human sexual response cycle.

Someone's sexual orientation is their pattern of sexual interest (or lack thereof) in the opposite and/or same sex. Physical and emotional aspects of sexuality include bonds between individuals that are expressed through profound feelings or physical manifestations of love, trust, and care. Social aspects deal with the effects of human society on one's sexuality, while spirituality concerns an individual's spiritual connection with others. Sexuality also affects and is affected by cultural, political, legal, philosophical, moral, ethical, and religious aspects of life.

Interest in sexual activity normally increases when an individual reaches puberty. Although no single theory on the cause of sexual orientation has yet gained widespread support, there is considerably more evidence supporting non-social causes than social ones, especially for males. Hypothesized social causes are supported by only weak evidence, distorted by numerous confounding factors. This is further supported by cross-cultural evidence because the incidence of homosexuality is not significantly higher in cultures that are more tolerant of it.

Evolutionary perspectives on human coupling, reproduction and reproduction strategies, and social learning theory provide further views of sexuality. Sociocultural aspects of sexuality include historical developments and religious beliefs. Some cultures have been described as sexually repressive. The study of sexuality also includes human identity within social groups, sexually transmitted infections (STIs), and birth control methods.

== Development ==
=== Sexual orientation ===
There is considerably more evidence supporting innate causes of sexual orientation than learned ones, especially for males. This evidence includes the cross-cultural correlation of homosexuality and childhood gender nonconformity, moderate genetic influences found in twin studies, evidence for prenatal hormonal effects on brain organization, the fraternal birth order effect, and the finding that in rare cases where infant males were raised as girls due to physical differences or deformity, they nevertheless turned out attracted to females. Hypothesized social causes are supported by only weak evidence, distorted by numerous confounding factors.

Cross-cultural evidence also leans more toward non-social causes. Cultures that are very tolerant of homosexuality do not have significantly higher rates of it. Homosexual behavior is relatively common among boys in British single-sex boarding schools, but adult Britons who attended such schools are no more likely to engage in homosexual behavior than those who did not. In an extreme case, the Sambia people ritually require their boys to engage in homosexual behavior during adolescence before they have any access to females, yet most of these boys go on to lead heterosexual lives.

It is not fully understood why genes causing homosexuality persist in the gene pool. One hypothesis involves kin selection, suggesting that homosexuals invest heavily enough in their relatives to offset the cost of not reproducing as much directly. This has not been supported by studies in Western cultures, but several studies in Samoa have found some support for this hypothesis. Another hypothesis involves sexually antagonistic genes, which cause homosexuality when expressed in males but increase reproduction when expressed in females. Studies in both Western and non-Western cultures have found support for this hypothesis.

=== Gender differences ===
Psychological theories exist regarding the development and expression of gender differences in human sexuality. A number of them (including neo-analytic theories, sociobiological theories, social learning theory, social role theory, and script theory) agree in predicting that men should be more approving of casual sex (sex happening outside a stable, committed relationship such as marriage) and should also be more promiscuous (have a higher number of sexual partners) than women. These theories are mostly consistent with observed differences in males' and females' attitudes toward casual sex before marriage in the United States. Other aspects of human sexuality, such as sexual satisfaction, incidence of oral sex, and attitudes toward homosexuality and masturbation, show little to no observed difference between males and females. Observed gender differences regarding the number of sexual partners are modest, with males tending to have slightly more than females.

== Biological and physiological aspects ==
Like other mammals, humans are primarily grouped into either the male or female sex.

The biological aspects of human sexuality deal with the reproductive system, the sexual response cycle, and the factors that affect these aspects. They also deal with the influence of biological factors on other aspects of sexuality, such as organic and neurological responses, heredity, hormonal issues, gender issues, and sexual dysfunction.

=== Physical anatomy and reproduction ===
Males and females are anatomically similar; this extends to some degree to the development of the reproductive system. As adults, they have different reproductive mechanisms that enable them to perform sexual acts and to reproduce. Men and women react similarly to sexual stimuli with minor differences. Women have a monthly reproductive cycle, whereas the male sperm production cycle is more continuous.

==== Brain ====
The hypothalamus is the most important part of the brain for sexual functioning. This is a small area at the base of the brain consisting of several groups of nerve cell bodies that receive input from the limbic system. Studies have shown that within lab animals, the destruction of certain areas of the hypothalamus causes the elimination of sexual behavior. The hypothalamus is important because of its relationship to the pituitary gland, which lies beneath it. The pituitary gland secretes hormones that are produced in the hypothalamus and itself. The four important sexual hormones are oxytocin, prolactin, follicle-stimulating hormone, and luteinizing hormone.

Oxytocin, sometimes referred to as the "love hormone", is released in both sexes during sexual intercourse when an orgasm is achieved. Oxytocin has been suggested as critical to the thoughts and behaviors required to maintain close relationships. The hormone is also released in women when they give birth or are breastfeeding. Prolactin and oxytocin are responsible for inducing milk production in women. Follicle-stimulating hormone (FSH) is responsible for ovulation in women, and acts by triggering egg maturity; in men, it stimulates sperm production. Luteinizing hormone (LH) triggers ovulation, which is the release of a mature egg.

==== Male anatomy and reproductive system ====
Males have both internal and external genitalia that are responsible for procreation and sexual intercourse. Production of spermatozoa (sperm) is also cyclic, but unlike the female ovulation cycle, the sperm production cycle is constantly producing millions of sperm daily.

===== External male anatomy =====
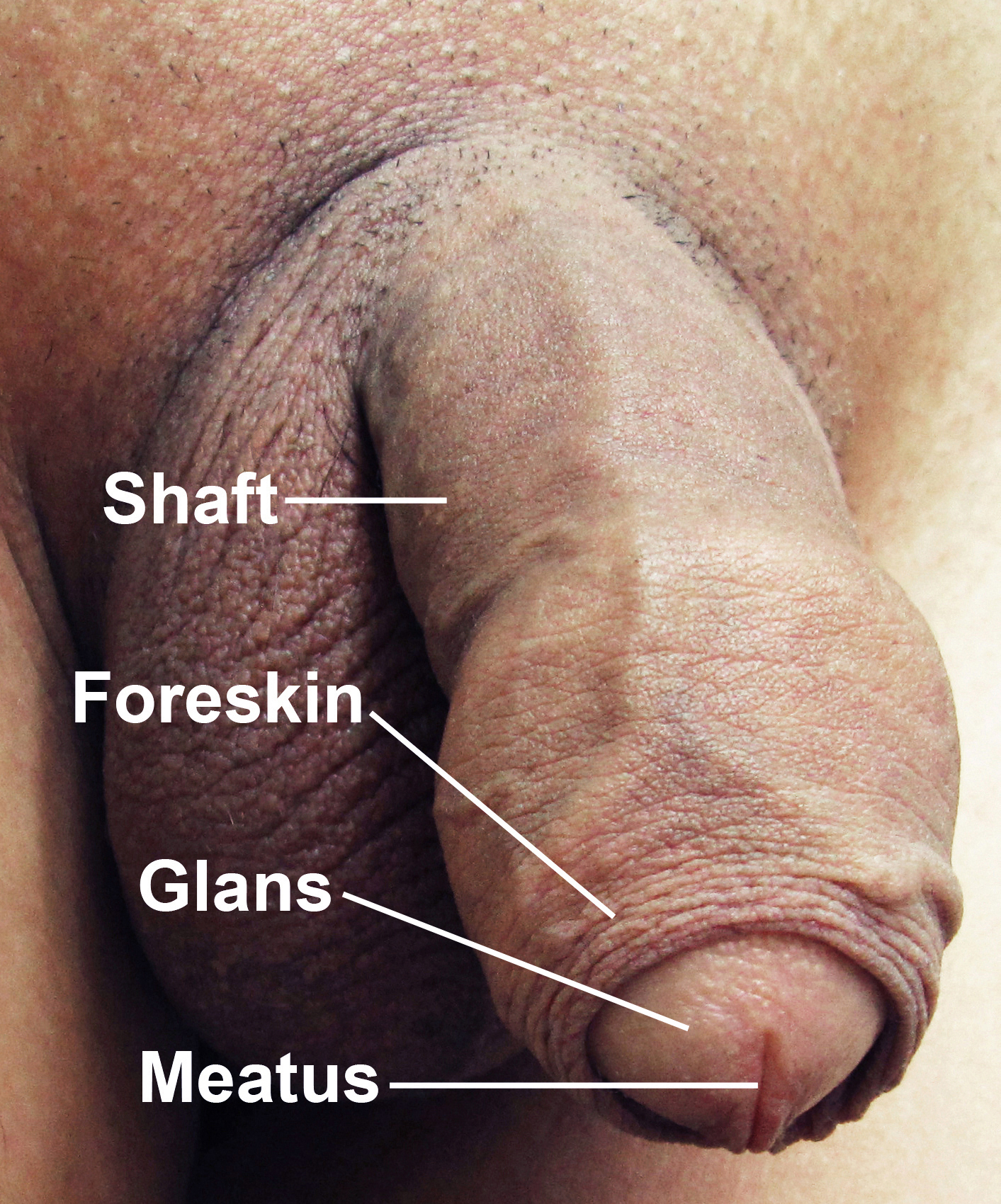
External male genitals (depilated)

The external male genitalia are the penis and the scrotum.

The penis provides a passageway for sperm and urine. The penis consists of nerves, blood vessels, fibrous tissue, and three parallel cylinders of spongy tissue. Other components of the penis include the shaft, glans, root, cavernous bodies, and spongy body. The three cylindrical bodies of spongy tissue, which are filled with blood vessels, run along the length of the shaft. The two bodies that lie side by side in the upper portion of the penis are the corpora cavernosa (cavernous bodies). The third, called the corpus spongiosum (spongy body), is a tube that lies centrally beneath the others and expands at the end to form the tip of the penis (glans). During arousal, these bodies erect the penis by filling with blood.

The raised rim at the border of the shaft and glans is called the corona. The urethra connects the urinary bladder to the penis where urine exits the penis through the urethral meatus. The urethra eliminates urine and acts as a channel for semen and sperm to exit the body during sexual intercourse. The root consists of the expanded ends of the cavernous bodies, which fan out to form the crura and attach to the pubic bone and the expanded end of the spongy body. The bulb of the penis is surrounded by the bulbospongiosus muscle, while the corpora cavernosa are surrounded by the ischiocavernosus muscles. These aid urination and ejaculation. The penis has a foreskin that typically covers the glans; this is sometimes removed by circumcision for medical, religious or cultural reasons. In the scrotum, the testicles are held away from the body, one possible reason for this is so sperm can be produced in an environment slightly lower than normal body temperature.

The penis has very little muscular tissue, and this exists in its root. The shaft and glans have no muscle fibers. Unlike most other primates, male humans lack a penile bone.

==== Internal male anatomy ====
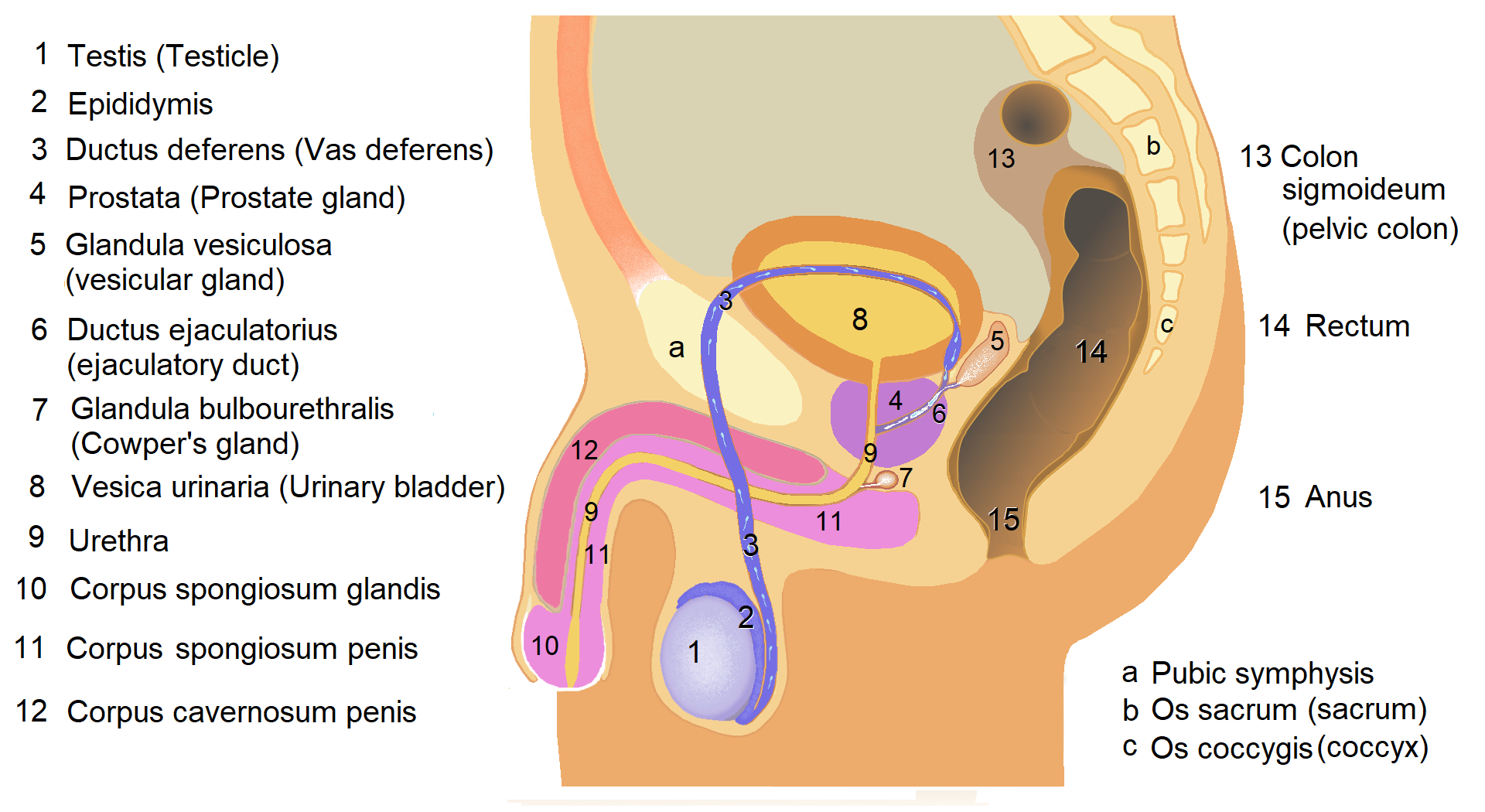
The male reproductive system

Male internal reproductive structures are the testicles, the duct system, the prostate and seminal vesicles, and the Cowper's gland.

The testicles (male gonads), are where sperm and male hormones are produced. Millions of sperm are produced daily in several hundred seminiferous tubules. Cells called the Leydig cells lie between the tubules; these produce hormones called androgens; these consist of testosterone and inhibin. The testicles are held by the spermatic cord, which is a tubelike structure containing blood vessels, nerves, the vas deferens, and a muscle that helps to raise and lower the testicles in response to temperature changes and sexual arousal, in which the testicles are drawn closer to the body.

Sperm gets transported through a four-part duct system. The first part of this system is the epididymis. The testicles converge to form the seminiferous tubules, coiled tubes at the top and back of each testicle. The second part of the duct system is the vas deferens, a muscular tube that begins at the lower end of the epididymis. The vas deferens passes upward along the side of the testicles to become part of the spermatic cord. The expanded end is the ampulla, which stores sperm before ejaculation. The third part of the duct system is the ejaculatory ducts, which are 1-inch (2.5 cm)-long paired tubes that pass through the prostate gland, where semen is produced. The prostate gland is a solid, chestnut-shaped organ that surrounds the first part of the urethra, which carries urine and semen. Similar to the female G-spot, the prostate provides sexual stimulation and can lead to orgasm through anal sex.

The prostate gland and the seminal vesicles produce seminal fluid that is mixed with sperm to create semen. The prostate gland lies under the bladder and in front of the rectum. It consists of two main zones: the inner zone that produces secretions to keep the lining of the male urethra moist and the outer zone that produces seminal fluids to facilitate the passage of semen. The seminal vesicles secrete fructose for sperm activation and mobilization, prostaglandins to cause uterine contractions that aid movement through the uterus, and bases that help neutralize the acidity of the vagina. The Cowper's glands, or bulbourethral glands, are two pea-sized structures beneath the prostate.

==== Female anatomy and reproductive system ====
===== External female anatomy =====
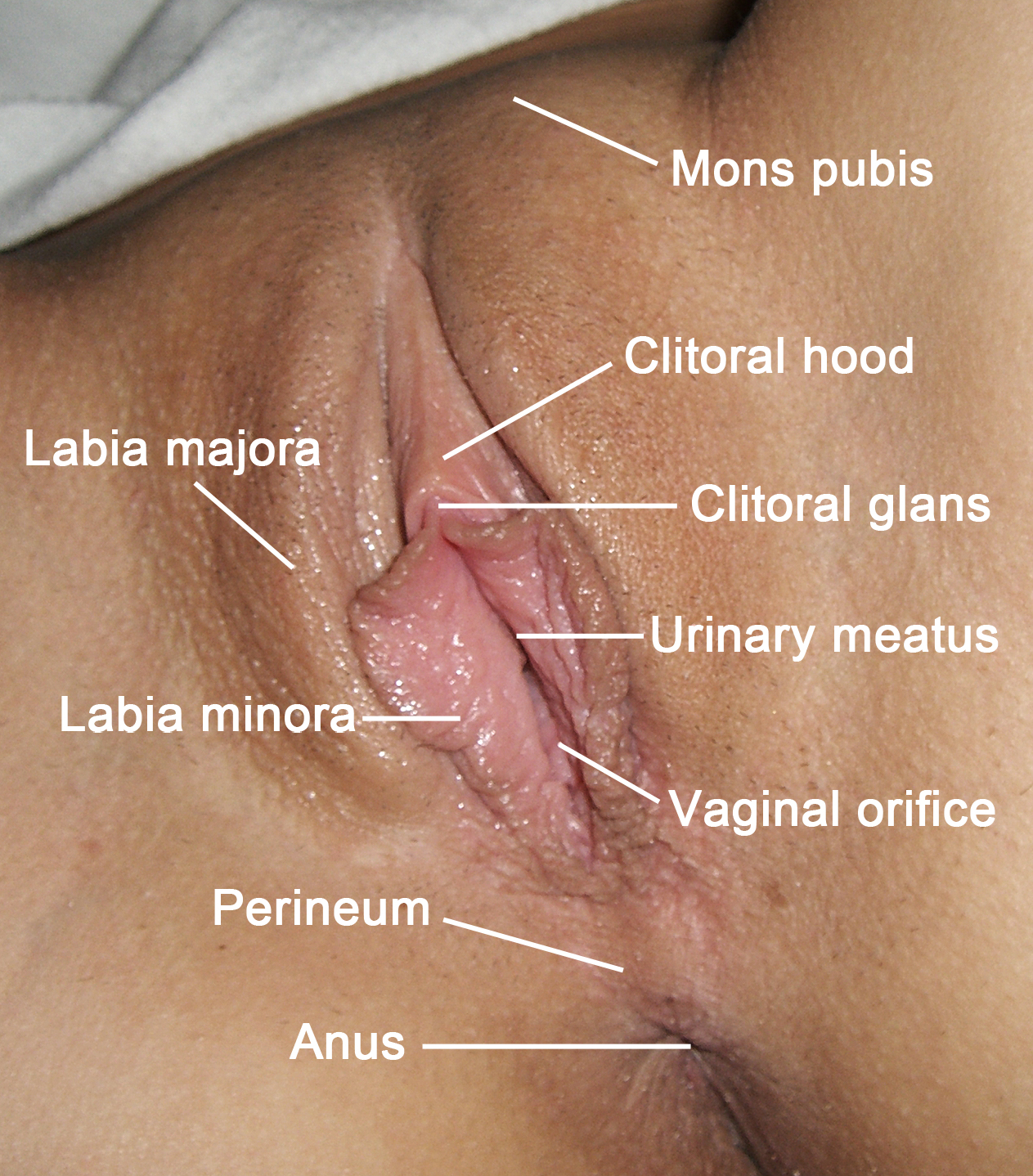
External female genitals (depilated)

The external female genitalia are the vulva.

The mons pubis is a soft layer of fatty tissue overlaying the pubic bone. Following puberty, this area grows in size. It has many nerve endings and is sensitive to stimulation.

The labia minora and labia majora are collectively known as the labia or "lips". The labia majora are two elongated folds of skin extending from the mons to the perineum. Its outer surface becomes covered with hair after puberty. In between the labia majora are the labia minora, two hairless folds of skin that meet above the clitoris to form the clitoral hood, which is highly sensitive to touch. The labia minora become engorged with blood during sexual stimulation, causing them to swell and turn red.

The labia minora are composed of connective tissues that are richly supplied with blood vessels which cause a pinkish appearance. Near the anus, the labia minora merge with the labia majora. In a sexually unstimulated state, the labia minora protects the vaginal and urethral opening by covering them. At the base of the labia minora are the Bartholin's glands, which add a few drops of an alkaline fluid to the vagina via ducts; this fluid helps to counteract the acidity of the outer vagina since sperm cannot live in an acidic environment. The Skene's glands are possibly responsible for secreting fluid during female ejaculation.

The clitoris is developed from the same embryonic tissue as the penis; it or its glans alone consists of as many (or more in some cases) nerve endings as the human penis or glans penis, making it extremely sensitive to touch. The clitoral glans, which is a small, elongated erectile structure, has only one known function—sexual sensations. It is the female's most sensitive erogenous zone and the main source of orgasm in women. Thick secretions called smegma collect around the clitoris.

The vaginal opening and the urethral opening are only visible when the labia minora are parted. These openings have many nerve endings that make them sensitive to touch. They are surrounded by a ring of sphincter muscles called the bulbocavernosus muscle. Underneath this muscle and on opposite sides of the vaginal opening are the vestibular bulbs, which help the vagina grip the penis by swelling with blood during arousal. Within the vaginal opening is the hymen, a thin membrane that partially covers the opening in many virgins. Rupture of the hymen has been historically considered the loss of one's virginity, though, by modern standards, loss of virginity is considered to be the first sexual intercourse. The hymen can be ruptured by activities other than sexual intercourse. The urethral opening connects to the bladder with the urethra; it expels urine from the bladder. This is located below the clitoris and above the vaginal opening.

The breasts are the subcutaneous tissues on the front thorax of the female body. Though they are not technically part of a woman's sexual anatomy, they do have roles in both sexual pleasure and reproduction. Breasts are modified sweat glands made up of fibrous tissues and fat that provide support and contain nerves, blood vessels, and lymphatic vessels. Their main purpose is to provide milk to a developing infant. Breasts develop during puberty in response to an increase in estrogen. Each adult breast consists of 15 to 20 milk-producing mammary glands, irregularly shaped lobes that include alveolar glands and a lactiferous duct leading to the nipple. The lobes are separated by dense connective tissues that support the glands and attach them to the tissues on the underlying pectoral muscles. Other connective tissue, which forms dense strands called suspensory ligaments, extends inward from the skin of the breast to the pectoral tissue to support the weight of the breast. Heredity and the quantity of fatty tissue determine the size of the breasts.

Men typically find female breasts attractive and this holds true for a variety of cultures. In women, stimulation of the nipple seems to result in activation of the brain's genital sensory cortex (the same region of the brain activated by stimulation of the clitoris, vagina, and cervix). This may be why many women find nipple stimulation arousing and why some women are able to orgasm by nipple stimulation alone.

===== Internal female anatomy =====
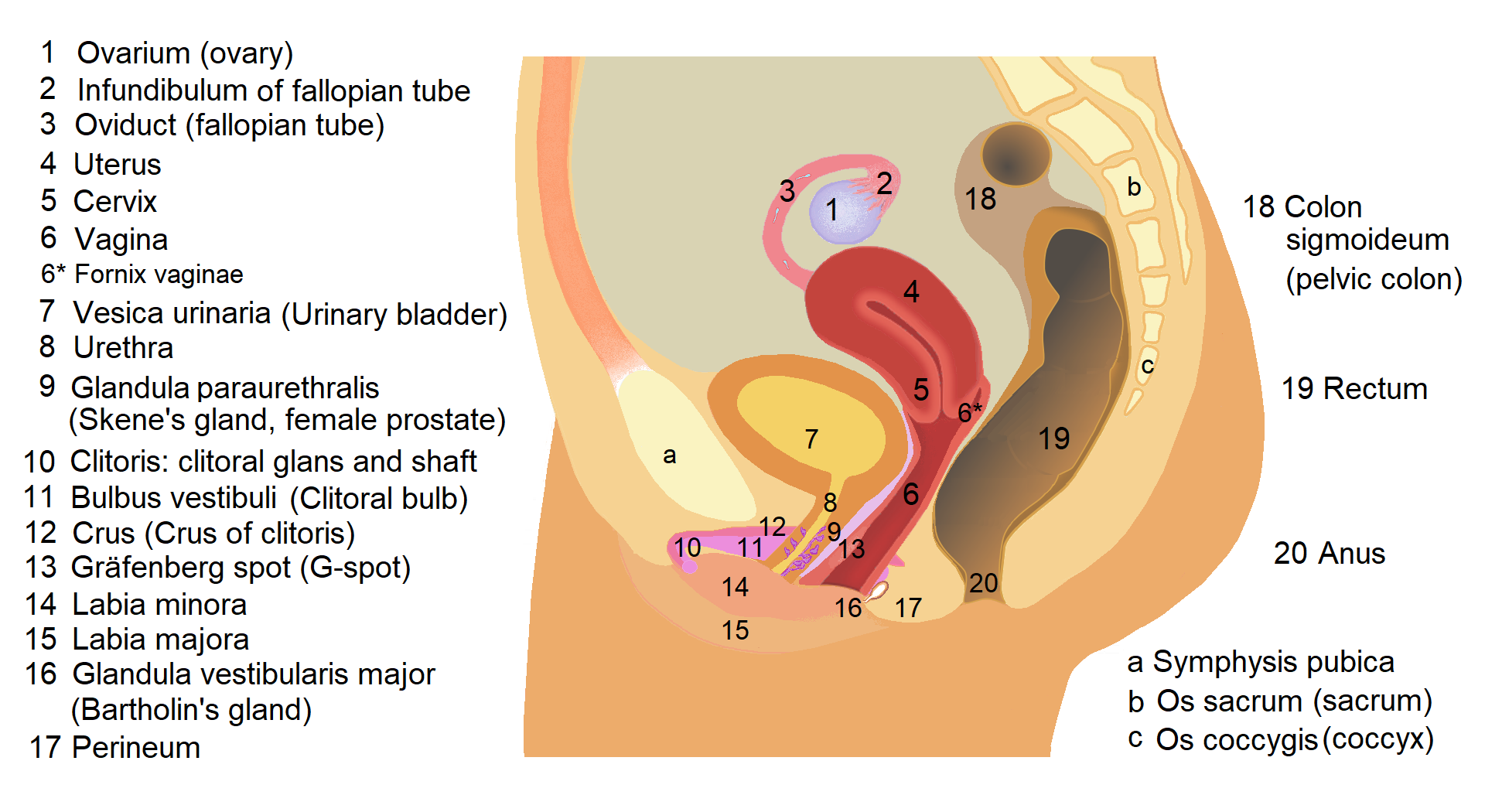
The female reproductive system

The female internal reproductive organs are the vagina, uterus, fallopian tubes, and ovaries. The vagina is a sheath-like canal that extends from the vulva to the cervix. It receives the penis during intercourse and serves as a depository for sperm. The vagina is also the birth canal; it can expand to 10 cm (3.9 in) during labor and delivery. The vagina is located between the bladder and the rectum. The vagina is normally collapsed, but during sexual arousal it opens, lengthens, and produces lubrication to allow the insertion of the penis. The vagina has three layered walls; it is a self-cleaning organ with natural bacteria that suppress the production of yeast. The G-spot, named after the Ernst Gräfenberg who first reported it in 1950, may be located in the front wall of the vagina and may cause orgasms. This area may vary in size and location between women; in some it may be absent. Various researchers dispute its structure or existence or regard it as an extension of the clitoris.

The uterus or womb is a hollow, muscular organ where a fertilized egg (ovum) will implant itself and grow into a fetus. The uterus lies in the pelvic cavity between the bladder and the bowel, and above the vagina. It is usually positioned in a 90-degree angle tilting forward, although in about 20% of women it tilts backwards. The uterus has three layers; the innermost layer is the endometrium, where the egg is implanted. During ovulation, this thickens for implantation. If implantation does not occur, it is sloughed off during menstruation. The cervix is the narrow end of the uterus. The broad part of the uterus is the fundus.

During ovulation, the ovum travels down the fallopian tubes to the uterus. These extend about four inches (10 cm) from both sides of the uterus. Finger-like projections at the ends of the tubes brush the ovaries and receive the ovum once it is released. The ovum then travels for three to four days to the uterus. After sexual intercourse, sperm swim up this funnel from the uterus. The lining of the tube and its secretions sustain the egg and the sperm, encouraging fertilization and nourishing the ovum until it reaches the uterus. If the ovum divides after fertilization, identical twins are produced. If separate eggs are fertilized by different sperm, the mother gives birth to non-identical or fraternal twins.

The ovaries (female gonads), develop from the same embryonic tissue as the testicles. The ovaries are suspended by ligaments and are the source where ova are stored and developed before ovulation. The ovaries also produce female hormones progesterone and estrogen. Within the ovaries, each ovum is surrounded by other cells and contained within a capsule called a primary follicle. At puberty, one or more of these follicles are stimulated to mature on a monthly basis. Once matured, these are called Graafian follicles. The female reproductive system does not produce the ova; about 60,000 ova are present at birth, only 400 of which will mature during the woman's lifetime.

Ovulation is based on a monthly cycle; the 14th day is the most fertile. On days one to four, menstruation and production of estrogen and progesterone decreases, and the endometrium starts thinning. The endometrium is sloughed off for the next three to six days. Once menstruation ends, the cycle begins again with an FSH surge from the pituitary gland. Days five to thirteen are known as the pre-ovulatory stage. During this stage, the pituitary gland secretes follicle-stimulating hormone (FSH). A negative feedback loop is enacted when estrogen is secreted to inhibit the release of FSH. Estrogen thickens the endometrium of the uterus. A surge of luteinizing hormone (LH) triggers ovulation.

On day 14, the LH surge causes a Graafian follicle to surface the ovary. The follicle ruptures and the ripe ovum is expelled into the abdominal cavity. The fallopian tubes pick up the ovum with the fimbria. The cervical mucus changes to aid the movement of sperm. On days 15 to 28—the post-ovulatory stage, the Graafian follicle—now called the corpus luteum—secretes estrogen. Production of progesterone increases, inhibiting LH release. The endometrium thickens to prepare for implantation, and the ovum travels down the fallopian tubes to the uterus. If the ovum is not fertilized and does not implant, menstruation begins.

=== Sexual response cycle ===
The sexual response cycle is a model that describes the physiological responses that occur during sexual activity. This model was created by William Masters and Virginia Johnson. According to Masters and Johnson, the human sexual response cycle consists of four phases; excitement, plateau, orgasm, and resolution, also called the EPOR model. During the excitement phase of the EPOR model, one attains the intrinsic motivation to have sex. The plateau phase is the precursor to orgasm, which may be mostly biological for men and mostly psychological for women. Orgasm is the release of tension, and the resolution period is the unaroused state before the cycle begins again.

The male sexual response cycle starts in the excitement phase; two centers in the spine are responsible for erections. Vasoconstriction in the penis begins, the heart rate increases, the scrotum thickens, the spermatic cord shortens, and the testicles become engorged with blood. In the plateau phase, the penis increases in diameter, the testicles become more engorged, and the Cowper's glands secrete pre-seminal fluid. The orgasm phase, during which rhythmic contractions occur every 0.8 seconds, consists of two phases; the emission phase, in which contractions of the vas deferens, prostate, and seminal vesicles encourage ejaculation, which is the second phase of orgasm. Ejaculation is called the expulsion phase; it cannot be reached without an orgasm. In the resolution phase, the male is now in an unaroused state consisting of a refractory (rest) period before the cycle can begin. This rest period may increase with age.

The female sexual response begins with the excitement phase, which can last from several minutes to several hours. Characteristics of this phase include increased heart and respiratory rate, and an elevation of blood pressure. Flushed skin or blotches of redness may occur on the chest and back; breasts increase slightly in size and nipples may become hardened and erect. The onset of vasocongestion results in swelling of the clitoris, labia minora, and vagina. The muscle that surrounds the vaginal opening tightens and the uterus elevates and grows in size. The vaginal walls begin to produce a lubricating liquid. The second phase, called the plateau phase, is characterized primarily by the intensification of the changes begun during the excitement phase. The plateau phase extends to the brink of orgasm, which initiates the resolution stage; the reversal of the changes begun during the excitement phase. During the orgasm stage the heart rate, blood pressure, muscle tension, and breathing rates peak. The pelvic muscle near the vagina, the anal sphincter, and the uterus contract. Muscle contractions in the vaginal area create a high level of pleasure, though all orgasms are centered in the clitoris.

=== Sexual dysfunction and sexual problems ===
Sexual disorders, according to the DSM-IV-TR, are disturbances in sexual desire and psycho-physiological changes that characterize the sexual response cycle and cause marked distress and interpersonal difficulty. Sexual dysfunctions are a result of physical or psychological disorders. Physical causes include hormonal imbalance, diabetes, heart disease and more; psychological causes include but are not limited to stress, anxiety, and depression. Sexual dysfunction affects both men and women. There are four major categories of sexual problems in women: desire disorders, arousal disorders, orgasmic disorders, and sexual pain disorders. Sexual desire disorder occurs when an individual lacks sexual desire because of hormonal changes, depression, and pregnancy. Arousal disorder is a female sexual dysfunction leading to a lack of vaginal lubrication. In addition, blood flow problems may affect arousal disorder. Lack of orgasm, also known as anorgasmia, is another sexual dysfunction in women. The last sexual disorder is painful intercourse, which can be caused by factors including pelvic mass, scar tissue, and sexually transmitted infections.

Three common sexual disorders for men are sexual desire disorder, ejaculation disorder, and erectile dysfunction. Lack of sexual desire in men may be caused by physical issues like low testosterone or psychological factors such as anxiety and depression. Ejaculation disorders include retrograde ejaculation, retarded ejaculation, and premature ejaculation. Erectile dysfunction is an inability to initiate and maintain an erection during intercourse.

== Psychological aspects ==
As one form of behavior, the psychological aspects of sexual expression have been studied in the context of emotional involvement, gender identity, intersubjective intimacy, and Darwinian reproductive efficacy. Sexuality in humans generates profound emotional and psychological responses. Some theorists identify sexuality as the central source of human personality. Psychological studies of sexuality focus on psychological influences that affect sexual behavior and experiences. Early psychological analyses were carried out by Sigmund Freud, who believed in a psychoanalytic approach. He also proposed the concepts of psychosexual development and the Oedipus complex, among other theories.

Gender identity is a person's sense of their own gender, whether male, female, or non-binary. Gender identity can correlate with assigned sex at birth or can differ from it. All societies have a set of gender categories that can serve as the basis of the formation of a person's social identity in relation to other members of society.

Sexual behavior and intimate relationships are strongly influenced by a person's sexual orientation.

Sexual orientation is an enduring pattern of romantic or sexual attraction (or a combination of these) to persons of the opposite sex, same sex, or both sexes. Heterosexual people are romantically/sexually attracted to the members of the opposite sex, gay and lesbian people are romantically/sexually attracted to people of the same sex, and those who are bisexual are romantically/sexually attracted to both sexes.

The idea that homosexuality results from reversed gender roles is reinforced by the media's portrayal of gay men as feminine and lesbians as masculine. However, a person's conformity or non-conformity to gender stereotypes does not always predict sexual orientation. Society believes that if a man is masculine, he is heterosexual, and if a man is feminine, he is homosexual. There is no strong evidence that a homosexual or bisexual orientation must be associated with atypical gender roles. By the early 21st century, homosexuality was no longer considered to be a pathology. Theories have linked many factors, including genetic, anatomical, birth order, and hormones in the prenatal environment, to homosexuality.

Other than the need to procreate, there are many other reasons people have sex. According to one study conducted on college students (Meston & Buss, 2007), the four main reasons for sexual activities are physical attraction, as a means to an end, to increase emotional connection, and to alleviate insecurity.

== Sexuality and age ==
=== Child sexuality ===
Until Sigmund Freud published his Three Essays on the Theory of Sexuality in 1905, children were often regarded as asexual, having no sexuality until later development. Sigmund Freud was one of the first researchers to take child sexuality seriously. His ideas, such as psychosexual development and the Oedipus conflict, have been much debated but acknowledging the existence of child sexuality was an important development. Freud wrote about the importance of interpersonal relationships to one's sexual and emotional development. From birth, the mother's connection to the infant affects the infant's later capacity for pleasure and attachment. Freud described two currents of emotional life; an affectionate current, including our bonds with the important people in our lives; and a sensual current, including our wish to gratify sexual impulses. During adolescence, a young person tries to integrate these two emotional currents.

Alfred Kinsey also examined child sexuality in his Kinsey Reports. Children are naturally curious about their bodies and sexual functions. For example, they wonder where babies come from, they notice the differences between males and females, and many engage in genital play, which is often mistaken for masturbation. Child sex play, also known as playing doctor, includes exhibiting or inspecting the genitals. Many children take part in some sex play, typically with siblings or friends. Sex play with others usually decreases as children grow, but they may later possess romantic interest in their peers. Curiosity levels remain high during these years, but the main surge in sexual interest occurs in adolescence.

Modern research has suggested that children normally exhibit sexual actions as a part of their development. The specific type of behavior depends on their age. For example, standing too close to other people is more frequent in younger children, and that behavior tends to decrease with age. Stress, difference in culture, and environment can affect the severity and frequency of sexual behaviors.

=== Sexuality in late adulthood ===
Adult sexuality originates in childhood. However, like many other human capacities, sexuality is not fixed, but matures and develops over time. A common stereotype associated with older adults is that they tend to lose interest in, or the ability to engage in sexual activity in later life. This misconception is reinforced by Western popular culture, which often ridicules older adults who express sexual desire. Age does not necessarily diminish the need or desire for sexual expression or intimacy. In long-term relationships, couples may find that the frequency of sexual activity decreases and the types of sexual expression change, but feelings of intimacy can continue to grow and deepen over time.

== Sociocultural aspects ==
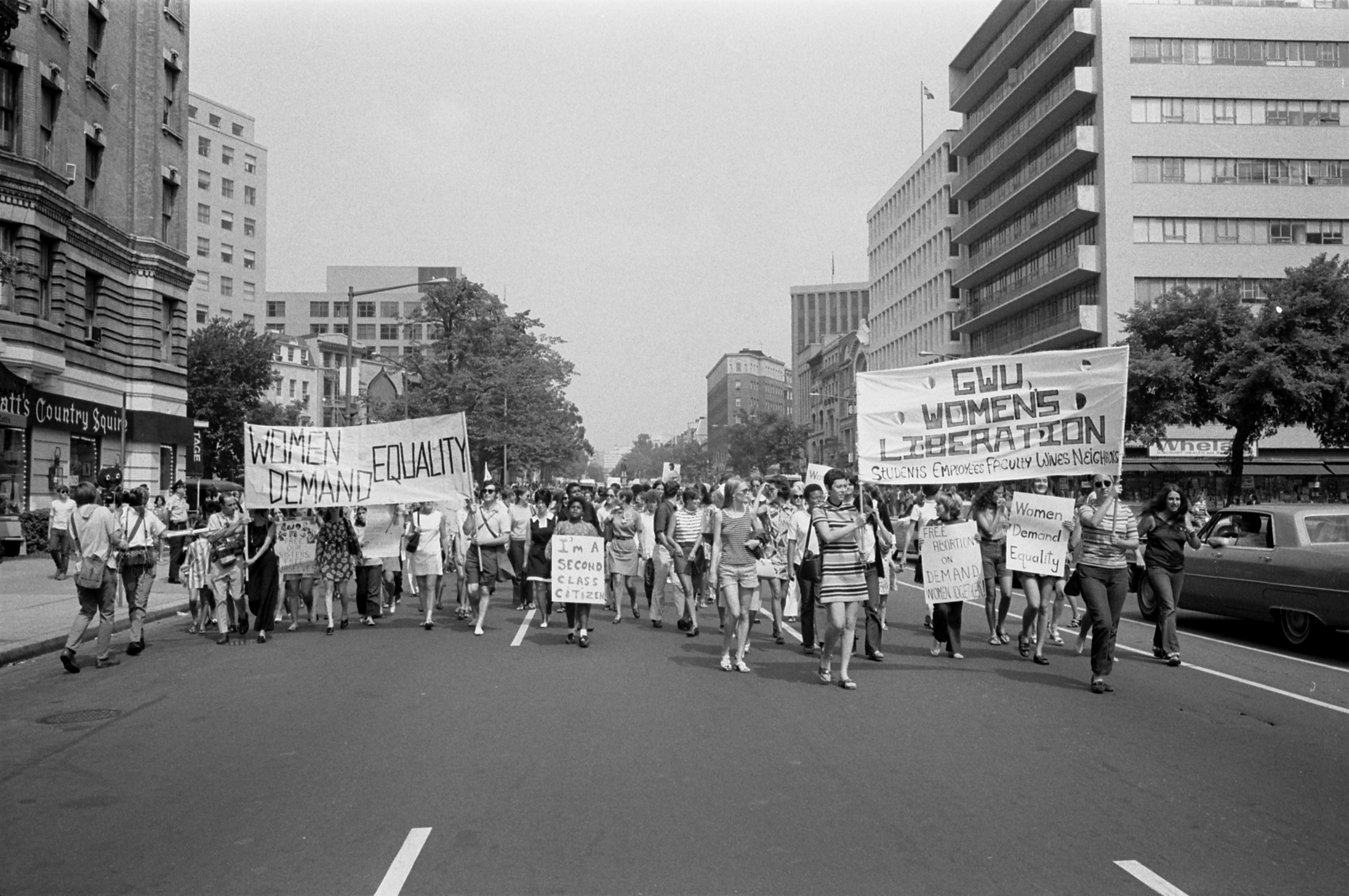
A women's liberation march in Washington, D.C., in August 1970, from Farragut Square to Lafayette Park

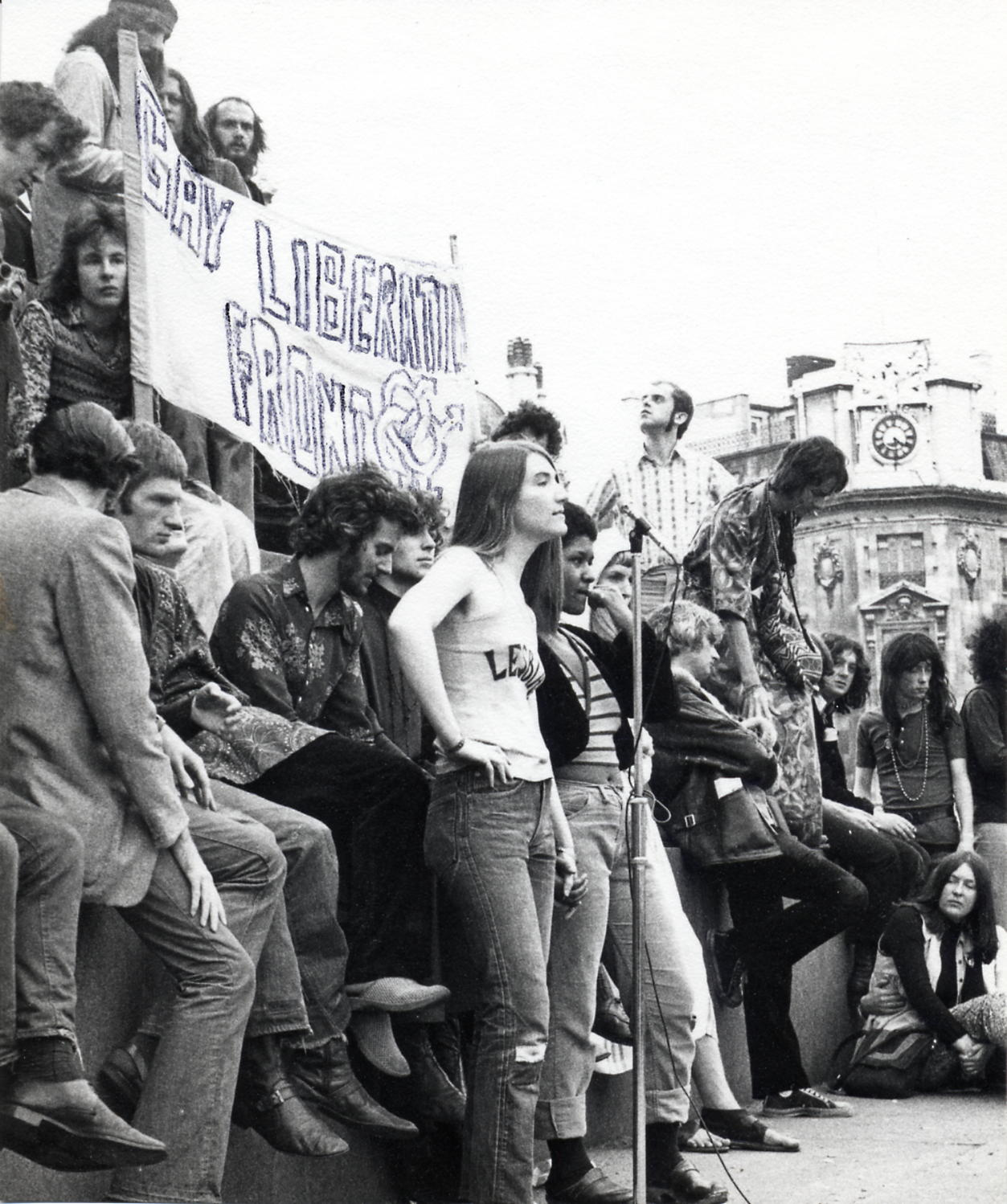
A Gay Liberation march in London, UK, 1971. A Gay Liberation Front banner is visible. Location is believed to be Trafalgar Square.

Human sexuality can be understood as part of the social life of humans, which is governed by implied rules of behavior and the status quo. This narrows the view to groups within a society. The socio-cultural context of society, including the effects of politics and the mass media, influences and forms sexual norms. Throughout history, social norms have been changing and continue to change as a result of movements such as the sexual revolution and the rise of gender equality.

=== Sex education ===
The age and manner in which children are informed of issues of sexuality is a matter of sex education. The school systems in almost all developed countries have some form of sex education, but the nature of the issues covered varies widely. In some countries, such as Australia and much of Europe, age-appropriate sex education often begins in pre-school, whereas other countries leave sex education to the pre-teenage and teenage years. Sex education covers a range of topics, including the physical, mental, and social aspects of sexual behavior. Communities have differing opinions on the appropriate age for children to learn about sexuality. According to Time magazine and CNN, 74% of teenagers in the United States reported that their major sources of sexual information were their peers and the media, compared to 10% who named their parents or a sex education course.

In the United States, some sex education programs encourage abstinence-only, the choice to restrain oneself from sexual activity. In contrast, comprehensive sex education aims to encourage students to take charge of their own sexuality and know how to have safe, healthy, and pleasurable sex if and when they choose to do so.

Proponents for an abstinence-only education believe that teaching a comprehensive curriculum would encourage teenagers to have sex, while proponents for comprehensive sex education argue that many teenagers will have sex regardless and should be equipped with knowledge of how to have sex responsibly. According to data from the National Longitudinal Survey of Youth, many teens who intend to be abstinent fail to do so, and when these teenagers do have sex, many do not use safe sex practices such as contraceptives.

=== Sexuality in history ===
Sexuality has been an important, vital part of human existence throughout history. All civilizations have managed sexuality through sexual standards, representations, and behavior.

Before the rise of agriculture, groups of hunter-gatherers and nomadic groups inhabited the world. These groups had less restrictive sexual standards that emphasized sexual pleasure and enjoyment, but with definite rules and constraints. Some underlying continuities or key regulatory standards contended with the tension between recognition of pleasure, interest, and the need to procreate for the sake of social order and economic survival. Hunter-gatherers also placed high value on certain types of sexual symbolism.

A common tension in hunter-gatherer societies is expressed in their art, which emphasized male sexuality and prowess, but also blurred gender lines in sexual matters. One example of these male-dominated portrayals is the Egyptian creation myth, in which the sun god Atum masturbates in the water, creating the Nile River. In Sumerian myth, the gods' semen filled the Tigris.

Once agricultural societies emerged, the sexual framework shifted in ways that persisted for many millennia in much of Asia, Africa, Europe, and parts of the Americas. One common characteristic new to these societies was the collective supervision of sexual behavior due to urbanization and the growth of population and population density. Children would commonly witness parents having sex because many families shared the same sleeping quarters. Due to land ownership, determination of children's paternity became important, and society and family life became patriarchal. These changes in sexual ideology were used to control female sexuality and to differentiate standards by gender. With these ideologies, sexual possessiveness and increases in jealousy emerged.

While retaining the precedents of earlier civilizations, each classical civilization established a somewhat distinctive approach to gender, artistic expression of sexual beauty, and to behaviors such as homosexuality. Some of these distinctions are portrayed in sex manuals, which were also common among civilizations in China, Greece, Rome, Persia, and India; each has its own sexual history.

Before the High Middle Ages, homosexual acts appear to have been ignored or tolerated by the Christian church. During the 12th century, hostility toward homosexuality began to spread throughout religious and secular institutions. By the end of the 19th century, it was viewed as a pathology.

During the beginning of the Industrial Revolution of the 18th and 19th centuries, many changes in sexual standards occurred. New artificial birth control devices such as the condom and diaphragm were introduced. Doctors started claiming a new role in sexual matters, urging that their advice was crucial to sexual morality and health. New pornographic industries grew, and Japan adopted its first laws against homosexuality. In Western societies, the definition of homosexuality was constantly changing; Western influence on other cultures became more prevalent. New contacts created serious issues around sexuality and sexual traditions. There were also major shifts in sexual behavior. During this period, puberty began occurring at younger ages, so a new focus on adolescence as a time of sexual confusion and danger emerged. There was a new focus on the purpose of marriage; it was increasing regarded as being for love rather than only for economics and reproduction.

Havelock Ellis and Sigmund Freud adopted more accepting stances toward homosexuality; Ellis said homosexuality was inborn and therefore not immoral, not a disease, and that many homosexuals made significant contributions to society. Freud wrote that all human beings as capable of becoming either heterosexual or homosexual; neither orientation was assumed to be innate. According to Freud, a person's orientation depended on the resolution of the Oedipus complex. He said male homosexuality resulted when a young boy had an authoritarian, rejecting mother and turned to his father for love and affection, and later to men in general. He said female homosexuality developed when a girl loved her mother and identified with her father and became fixated at that stage.

Alfred Kinsey initiated the modern era of sex research. He collected data from questionnaires given to his students at Indiana University, but then switched to personal interviews about sexual behaviors. Kinsey and his colleagues sampled 5,300 men and 5,940 women. He found that most people masturbated, that many engaged in oral sex, that women are capable of having multiple orgasms, and that many men had had some type of homosexual experience in their lifetimes.

Before William Masters, a physician, and Virginia Johnson, a behavioral scientist, the study of anatomy and physiological studies of sex was still limited to experiments with laboratory animals. Masters and Johnson started to directly observe and record the physical responses in humans that are engaged in sexual activity under laboratory settings. They observed 10,000 episodes of sexual acts between 312 men and 382 women. This led to methods of treating clinical problems and abnormalities. Masters and Johnson opened the first sex therapy clinic in 1965. In 1970, they described their therapeutic techniques in their book, Human Sexual Inadequacy.

The first edition of the Diagnostic and Statistical Manual of Mental Disorders, published by the American Psychiatric Association, classified homosexuality as a mental illness, and more specifically, a "sociopathic personality disturbance". This definition remained the professional understanding of homosexuality until 1973 when the American Psychiatric Association removed homosexuality from their list of diagnoses for mental disorders. Through her research of heterosexual and homosexual men, Evelyn Hooker revealed that there was no correlation between homosexuality and psychological maladjustment, and her findings played a pivotal role in shifting the scientific community away from the perspective that homosexuality was something that needed to be treated or cured.

=== Sexuality, colonialism, and race ===
European conquerors/colonists discovered that many non-European cultures had expressions of sexuality and gender which differed from European notion of heterosexual cisnormativity. These would include transgender practices. In 1516, Vasco Núñez de Balboa, a Spanish explorer, discovered indigenous people in Central America, among whom several indigenous men who dressed like women and had sex with each other, resulting in him feeding forty of these men to his dogs for having non-gender conforming behaviors and sexuality. In North America and the United States, Europeans have used claims of sexual immorality to justify discrimination against racial and ethnic minorities.

Scholars also study the ways in which colonialism has affected sexuality today and argue that due to racism and slavery it has been dramatically changed from the way it had previously been understood.

In her book, Carnal Knowledge and Imperial Power: Gender, Race, and Morality in Colonial Asia, Laura Stoler investigates how the Dutch colonists used sexual control and gender-specific sexual sanctions to distinguish between the rulers from the ruled and enforce colonial domination onto the people of Indonesia.

In America, there are 155 native tribes that are recorded to have embraced two-spirit people within their tribes, but the total number of tribes could be greater than what is documented. Two-spirit people were and still are members of communities who do not fall under Western gender categories of male and female, but rather under a "third gender" category. This system of gender contradicts both the gender binary and the assertion that sex and gender are the same. Instead of conforming to traditional roles of men and women, two-spirit fill a special niche in their communities.

For example, two-spirited people are commonly revered for possessing special wisdom and spiritual powers. Two-spirited people also can take part in marriages, either monogamous and polygamous ones. Historically, European colonizers perceived relationships involving two-spirited people as homosexuality, and therefore believed in the moral inferiority of native people. In reaction, colonizers began to impose their own religious and social norms on indigenous communities, diminishing the role of two-spirit people in native cultures. Within reservations, the Religious Crime Code of the 1880s explicitly aimed to "aggressively attack Native sexual and marriage practices". The goal of colonizers was for native peoples to assimilate into Euro-American ideals of family, sexuality, gender expression, and more.

The link between constructed sexual meanings and racial ideologies has been studied. According to Joane Nagel, sexual meanings are constructed to maintain racial-ethnic-national boundaries by the denigration of "others" and regulation of sexual behavior within the group. She writes, "both adherence to and deviation from such approved behaviors, define and reinforce racial, ethnic, and nationalist regimes". In the United States people of color face the effects of colonialism in different ways with stereotypes such as the Mammy and Jezebel for Black women; lotus blossom and dragon lady for Asian women; and the spicy Latina. These stereotypes contrast with standards of sexual conservatism, creating a dichotomy that dehumanizes and demonizes the stereotyped groups. An example of a stereotype that lies at the intersection of racism, classism, and misogyny is the archetype of the welfare queen. Cathy Cohen describes how the welfare queen stereotype demonizes poor black single mothers for deviating from conventions surrounding family structure.

=== Reproductive and sexual rights ===
Reproductive and sexual rights encompass the concept of applying human rights to issues related to reproduction and sexuality. This concept is a modern one, and remains controversial since it deals, directly and indirectly, with issues such as contraception, LGBT rights, abortion, sex education, freedom to choose a partner, freedom to decide whether to be sexually active or not, right to bodily integrity, freedom to decide whether or not, and when, to have children. These are all global issues that exist in all cultures to some extent, but manifest differently depending on the specific contexts.

According to the Swedish government, "sexual rights include the right of all people to decide over their own bodies and sexuality" and "reproductive rights comprise the right of individuals to decide on the number of children they have and the intervals at which they are born." Such rights are not accepted in all cultures, with practices such criminalization of consensual sexual activities (such as those related to homosexual acts and sexual acts outside marriage), acceptance of forced marriage and child marriage, failure to criminalize all non-consensual sexual encounters (such as marital rape), female genital mutilation, or restricted availability of contraception, being common around the world.

=== Stigma of contraceptives in the U.S. ===
In 1915, Emma Goldman and Margaret Sanger, leaders of the birth control movement, began to spread information regarding contraception in opposition to the laws, such as the Comstock Law, that demonized it. One of their main purposes was to assert that the birth control movement was about empowering women with personal reproductive and economic freedom for those who could not afford to parent a child or simply did not want one. Goldman and Sanger saw it necessary to educate people as contraceptives were quickly being stigmatized as a population control tactic due to being a policy limiting births, disregarding that this limitation did not target ecological, political, or large economic conditions. This stigma targeted lower-class women who had the most need of access to contraception.

Birth control finally began to lose stigma in 1936 when the ruling of U.S. v. One Package declared that prescribing contraception to save a person's life or well-being was no longer illegal under the Comstock Law. Although opinions varied on when birth control should be available to women, by 1938, there were 347 birth control clinics in the United States but advertising their services remained illegal.

The stigma continued to lose credibility as First Lady Eleanor Roosevelt publicly showed her support for birth control through the four terms her husband served (1933–1945). However, it was not until 1966 that the Federal Government began to fund family planning and subsidized birth control services for lower-class women and families at the order of President Lyndon B. Johnson. This funding continued after 1970 under the Family Planning Services and Population Research Act. Today, all Health Insurance Marketplace plans are required to cover all forms of contraception, including sterilization procedures, as a result of The Affordable Care Act signed by President Barack Obama in 2010.

=== Stigma and activism during the AIDS epidemic ===
In 1981, doctors diagnosed the first reported cases of AIDS in America. The disease disproportionately affected and continues to affect gay and bisexual men, especially black and Latino men. The Reagan administration is criticized for its apathy towards the AIDS epidemic, and audio recordings reveal that Ronald Reagan's press secretary Larry Speakes viewed the epidemic as a joke, mocking AIDS by calling it the "gay plague". The epidemic also carried stigma coming from religious influences. For example, Cardinal Krol voiced that AIDS was "an act of vengeance against the sin of homosexuality", which clarifies the specific meaning behind the pope's mention of "the moral source of AIDS".

Activism during the AIDS crisis focused on promoting safe sex practices to raise awareness that the disease could be prevented. The "Safe Sex is Hot Sex" campaign, for example, aimed to promote the use of condoms. Campaigns by the U.S. government, however, diverged from advocacy of safe sex. In 1987, Congress even denied federal funding from awareness campaigns that "[promoted] or [encouraged], directly or indirectly, homosexual activities". Instead, campaigns by the government primarily relied on scare tactics in order to instill fear in men who had sex with other men.

In addition to prevention campaigns, activists also sought to counteract narratives that led to the "social death" for people living with AIDS. Gay men from San Francisco and New York City created the Denver Principles, a foundational document that demanded the rights, agency, and dignity of people living with AIDS.

In his article "Emergence of Gay Identity and Gay Social Movements in Developing Countries", Matthew Roberts discusses how international AIDS prevention campaigns created opportunities for gay men to interact with other openly gay men from other countries. These interactions allowed western gay "culture" to be introduced to gay men in countries where homosexuality was not an important identifier. Thus, group organizers self-identified as gay more and more, creating the basis for further development of gay consciousness in different countries.

== Sexual behavior ==
=== General activities and health ===
In humans, sexual intercourse has been shown to have health benefits, such as an improved sense of smell, reduction in stress and blood pressure, increased immunity, and decreased risk of prostate cancer. Sexual intimacy and orgasms increase levels of oxytocin, which helps people bond and build trust. Some of these benefits, such as stress reduction, also apply to masturbation, as distinct from sexual intercourse with another person. Masturbation is also a healthy element of sexual development in itself.

A long-term study of 3,500 people between ages 30 and 101 by clinical neuropsychologist David Weeks, MD, head of old-age psychology at the Royal Edinburgh Hospital in Scotland, said he found that "sex helps you look between four and seven years younger", according to impartial ratings of the subjects' photographs. Exclusive causation, however, is unclear, and the benefits may be indirectly related to sex and directly related to significant reductions in stress, greater contentment, and better sleep that sex promotes.

Sexual intercourse can also be a disease vector. There are 19 million new cases of sexually transmitted infections (STI) every year in the U.S., and worldwide there are over 340 million sexually transmitted infections each year. More than half of these occur in adolescents and young adults aged 15–24 years. At least one in four US teenage girls has a sexually transmitted infection. In the U.S., about 30% of 15- to 17-year-olds have had sexual intercourse, but only about 80% of 15- to 19-year-olds report using condoms for their first sexual intercourse. In one study, more than 75% of young women age 18–25 years felt they were at low risk of acquiring an STI.

=== Creating a relationship ===
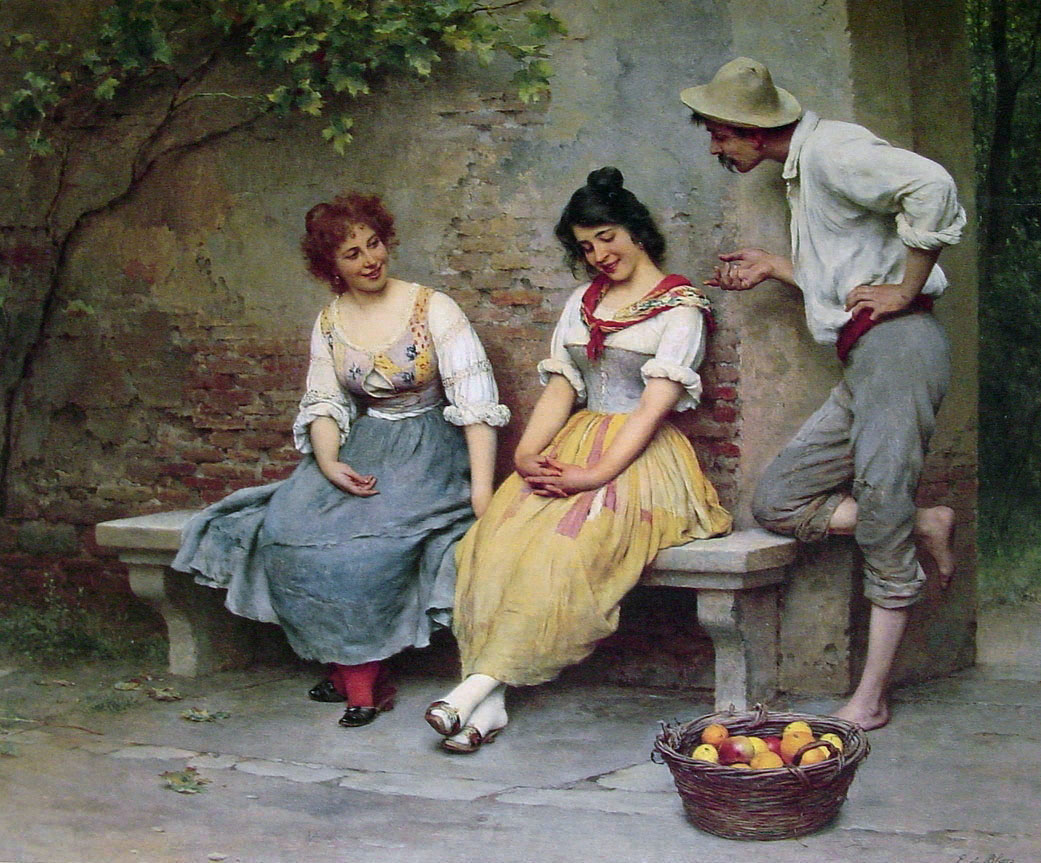
The Flirtation, Eugene de Blaas, 1904

People both consciously and subconsciously seek to attract others with whom they can form deep relationships. This may be for companionship, procreation, or an intimate relationship. This involves interactive processes whereby people find and attract potential partners and maintain a relationship. These processes, which involve attracting one or more partners and maintaining sexual interest, can include:

- Flirting, the use of indirect behavior to convey romantic or sexual interest. It can involve verbal or non-verbal cues, such as sexual comments, body language, gazing, or close to another, but non-verbal flirting is more common. Flirting is a socially accepted way of attracting someone. There are different types of flirting, and most people usually have one way of flirting that makes them most comfortable. When flirting, people can be polite, playful, physical, etc. Sometimes it is difficult to know whether or not the person is interested. Non-verbal flirting allows people to test another's interest without fear of direct rejection. Flirting styles vary according to culture. Different cultures have different social etiquette. For example, length of eye contact, or how closely one stands by someone.
- Seduction, the process whereby one person deliberately entices another to engage in sexual behavior. This behavior is one that the person you are seducing would not usually do, unless sexually aroused. Seduction can be seen as both a positive and a negative. Since the word seduction has a Latin meaning, which is "to lead astray" it can be viewed negatively.

=== Sexual attraction ===
Sexual attraction is attraction on the basis of sexual desire, while sexual attractiveness (colloquially known as "sex appeal") is the quality of arousing such interest in others. An individual's ability to attract the sexual or erotic interest of another person is a factor in sexual selection or mate choice.

Sexual attraction can be to the physical or other qualities or traits of a person, or to such qualities in the context in which they appear. The attraction may be to a person's aesthetics or movements or to their voice or smell, besides other factors. The attraction may be enhanced by a person's adornments, clothing, perfume, hair length and style, and anything else which can attract the sexual interest of another person. It can also be influenced by individual genetic, psychological, or cultural factors, or to other, more amorphous qualities of the person. Sexual attraction is also a response to another person that depends on a combination of the person possessing the traits and also on the criteria of the person who is attracted.

Though attempts have been made to devise objective criteria of sexual attractiveness and measure it as one of several bodily forms of capital asset (see erotic capital), a person's sexual attractiveness is to a large extent a subjective measure dependent on another person's interest, perception, and sexual orientation. For example, a gay or lesbian person would typically find a person of the same sex to be more attractive than one of the other sex. A bisexual person would find either sex to be attractive.

In addition, there are asexual people, who usually do not experience sexual attraction for either sex, though they may have romantic attraction (homoromantic, biromantic or heteroromantic). Interpersonal attraction includes factors such as physical or psychological similarity, familiarity or possessing a preponderance of common or familiar features, similarity, complementarity, reciprocal liking, and reinforcement.

The ability of a person's physical and other qualities to create a sexual interest in others is the basis of their use in advertising, music video, pornography, film, and other visual media, as well as in modeling, sex work and other occupations.

=== Non-normative sexuality ===
Although sexual behaviors are deeply personal and often reserved for private or intimate settings, they are not unaffected by the pressures of social norms or the forces of cultural conformity. While taboo, stigma and feelings of shame surrounding certain sexual acts and the free exploration of each person's unique sexuality cause many people to moderate their language and behavior to within the bounds of what their culture deems acceptable, human sexuality is not limited to any one set of cultural norms. As such, non-normative sexuality refers to any sexual behavior which does not conform to the norms of a given society or culture. This includes, but is not limited to, paraphilia, fetishism and kink.

As social norms are dynamic and vary wildly across cultures and time periods, the concept of conforming one's sexuality to what is considered "acceptable" depends entirely on the context in which they live. In other words, what is normative or acceptable in one society may be considered non-normative or unacceptable in another place or time period. Social control of sexual behaviors within a given culture is typically enforced through a combination of stigmatization of sexual minorities and non-normative sexual behaviors, religious dogma, and law.

=== Legal issues ===
Globally, laws regulate human sexuality in several ways, including criminalizing particular sexual behaviors, granting individuals the privacy or autonomy to make their own sexual decisions, protecting individuals with regard to equality and non-discrimination, recognizing and protecting other individual rights, as well as legislating matters regarding marriage and the family, and creating laws protecting individuals from violence, harassment, and persecution.

In the United States, there are two fundamentally different approaches, applied in different states, regarding the way the law is used to attempt to govern a person's sexuality. The "black letter" approach to law focuses on the study of pre-existing legal precedent and attempts to offer a clear framework of rules within which lawyers and others can work. In contrast, the socio-legal approach focuses more broadly on the relationship between the law and society, and offers a more contextualized view of the relationship between legal and social change.

Issues regarding human sexuality and human sexual orientation came to the forefront in Western law in the latter half of the twentieth century, as part of the gay liberation movement's encouragement of LGBT individuals to "come out of the closet" and engage with the legal system, primarily through courts. Therefore, many issues regarding human sexuality and the law are found in the opinions of the courts.

==== Sexual privacy ====
While the issue of privacy has been useful to sexual rights claims, some scholars have criticized its usefulness, saying that this perspective is too narrow and restrictive. The law is often slow to intervene in certain forms of coercive behavior that can limit individuals' control over their own sexuality (such as female genital mutilation, forced marriages or lack of access to reproductive health care). Many of these injustices are often perpetuated wholly or in part by private individuals rather than state agents, and as a result, there is an ongoing debate about the extent of state responsibility to prevent harmful practices and to investigate such practices when they do occur.

State intervention with regards to sexuality also occurs, and is considered acceptable by some, in certain instances (e.g. same-sex sexual activity or prostitution).

The legal systems surrounding prostitution are a topic of debate. Proponents for criminalization argue that sex work is an immoral practice that should not be tolerated, while proponents for decriminalization point out how criminalization does more harm than good. Within the feminist movement, there is also a debate over whether sex work is inherently objectifying and exploitative or whether sex workers have the agency to sell sex as a service.

When sex work is criminalized, sex workers do not have support from law enforcement when they fall victim to violence. In a 2003 survey of street-based sex workers in NYC, 80% said they had been threatened with or experienced violence, and many said the police were no help. 27% said they had experienced violence from police officers themselves. Different identities such as being black, transgender, or poor can result in a person being more likely to be criminally profiled by the police. For example, in New York, there is a law against "loitering for the purpose of engaging in prostitution", which has been nicknamed the "walking while trans" law because of how often transgender women are assumed to be sex workers and arrested for simply walking out in public.

== Religious sexual morality ==
In some religions, sexual behavior is regarded as primarily spiritual. In others it is treated as primarily physical. Some hold that sexual behavior is only spiritual within certain kinds of relationships, when used for specific purposes, or when incorporated into religious ritual. In some religions there are no distinctions between the physical and the spiritual, whereas some religions view human sexuality as a way of completing the gap that exists between the spiritual and the physical.

Many religious conservatives, especially those of Abrahamic religions and Christianity in particular, tend to view sexuality in terms of behavior (i.e. homosexuality or heterosexuality is what someone does). These conservatives tend to promote celibacy for gay people, and may also tend to believe that sexuality can be changed through conversion therapy or prayer to become an ex-gay. They may also see homosexuality as a form of mental illness, something that ought to be criminalized, an immoral abomination, caused by ineffective parenting, and view same-sex marriage as a threat to society.

On the other hand, most religious liberals define sexuality-related labels in terms of sexual attraction and self-identification. They may also view same-sex activity as morally neutral and as legally acceptable as opposite-sex activity, unrelated to mental illness, genetically or environmentally caused (but not as the result of bad parenting), and fixed. They also tend to be more in favor of same-sex marriage.

=== Judaism ===
According to Judaism, sex between a man and woman within marriage is sacred and should be regularly enjoyed; celibacy is considered sinful. (Note: Chabad is a traditional and Ashkenazi Jewish source. This page is not reflective of all modern Jewish beliefs, but instead describes one current set of views/some traditional views.)

Orthodox Judaism considers homosexuality to be a very sinful act and according to the Book of Leviticus, homosexuality is punishable by death.

=== Christianity ===
==== Early Christianity ====
Desire, including sexual desire and lust, were considered immoral and sinful, according to some authors. Elaine Pagels says, "By the beginning of the fifth century, Augustine had actually declared that spontaneous sexual desire is the proof of—and penalty for—universal original sin", though that this view goes against "most of his Christian predecessors". According to Jennifer Wright Knust, Paul framed desire a force Christians gained control over whereas non-Christians were "enslaved" by it; and he also said the bodies of Christians were members of Christ's body and thus sexual desire must be eschewed.

==== Roman Catholic Church ====
The Roman Catholic Church teaches that sexuality is "noble and worthy" and has a unitive and procreative end. For this reason, sexual activity's ideal should occur in the context of a marriage between a man and a woman, and open to the possibility of life. Pope Francis teaches in Amoris laetitia against "an attitude that would solve everything by applying general rules or deriving undue conclusions from particular theological considerations. and that he also warns that "not all discussions of doctrinal, moral or pastoral issues need to be settled by interventions of the magisterium." and that "We have been called to form consciences, not to replace them." The church has authoritative teachings on sexuality found in the catechism. The church places primacy of conscience especially on the regulation of births.

==== Anglicanism ====
The Anglican Church teaches that human sexuality is a gift from a loving God designed to be between a man and a woman in a monogamous lifetime union of marriage. It also views singleness and dedicated celibacy as Christ-like. It states that people with same sex attraction are loved by God and are welcomed as full members of the Body of Christ, while the Church leadership has a variety of views in regard to homosexual expression and ordination. Some expressions of sexuality are considered sinful including "promiscuity, prostitution, incest, pornography, pedophilia, predatory sexual behavior, and sadomasochism (all of which may be heterosexual and homosexual), adultery, violence against wives, and female circumcision". The Church is concerned with pressures on young people to engage sexually and encourages abstinence.

==== Evangelicalism ====
In matters of sexuality, several Evangelical churches promote the virginity pledge among young Evangelical Christians, who are invited to commit themselves during a public ceremony to sexual abstinence until Christian marriage. This pledge is often symbolized by a purity ring.

In evangelical churches, young adults and unmarried couples are encouraged to marry early in order to live a sexuality according to the will of God.

Although some churches are discreet on the subject, other evangelical churches speak of a satisfying sexuality as a gift from God and a component of a harmonious Christian marriage, in messages during worship services or conferences. Many evangelical books and websites are specialized on the subject.

The perceptions of homosexuality in the Evangelical Churches are varied. They range from liberal to fundamentalist or moderate conservative and neutral. A 2011 Pew Research Center study found that 84 percent of evangelical leaders surveyed believed homosexuality should be discouraged. It is in the fundamentalist conservative positions that there are antigay activists on TV or radio who claim that homosexuality is the cause of many social problems, such as terrorism. Some churches have a conservative moderate position. Although they do not approve homosexual practices, they claim to show sympathy and respect for homosexuals. Some evangelical denominations have adopted neutral positions, leaving the choice to local churches to decide for same-sex marriage. There are some international evangelical denominations that are gay-friendly.

The christian marriage is presented by some churches as a protection against sexual misconduct and a compulsory step to obtain a position of responsibility in the church. This concept, however, has been challenged by numerous sex scandals involving married evangelical leaders. Finally, evangelical theologians recalled that celibacy should be more valued in the Church today, since the gift of celibacy was taught and lived by Jesus Christ and Paul of Tarsus.

=== Islam ===
In Islam, desire for sex is considered to be a natural urge that should not be suppressed, although the concept of free sex is not accepted; these urges should be fulfilled responsibly. Marriage is considered to be a good deed; it does not hinder spiritual wayfaring. The term used for marriage within the Quran is nikah. Although Islamic sexuality is restrained via Islamic sexual jurisprudence, it emphasizes sexual pleasure within marriage. It is acceptable for a man to have more than one wife, but he must take care of those wives physically, mentally, emotionally, financially, and spiritually. Muslims believe that sexual intercourse is an act of worship that fulfils emotional and physical needs, and that producing children is one way in which humans can contribute to God's creation, and Islam discourages celibacy once an individual is married.

However, homosexuality is strictly forbidden in Islam, and some Muslim scholars have suggested that gay people should be put to death.

Some have argued that Islam has an open and playful approach to sex so long as it is within marriage, free of lewdness, fornication and adultery.

=== Hinduism ===
Hinduism emphasizes that sex is only appropriate between husband and wife, in which satisfying sexual urges through sexual pleasure is an important duty of marriage. Any sex before marriage is considered to interfere with intellectual development, especially between birth and the age of 25, which is said to be brahmacharya and this should be avoided. Kama (sensual pleasures) is one of the four purusharthas or aims of life (dharma, artha, kama, and moksha). The Hindu Kama Sutra deals partially with sexual intercourse; it is not exclusively a sexual or religious work.

=== Sikhism ===
Sikhism views chastity as important, as Sikhs believe that the divine spark of Waheguru is present inside every individual's body, therefore it is important for one to keep clean and pure. Sexual activity is limited to married couples, and extramarital sex is forbidden. Marriage is seen as a commitment to Waheguru and should be viewed as part of spiritual companionship, rather than just sexual intercourse, and monogamy is deeply emphasized in Sikhism. Any other way of living is discouraged, including celibacy and homosexuality. However, in comparison to other religions, the issue of sexuality in Sikhism is not considered one of paramount importance.

== See also ==
- Adolescent sexuality
- Age of consent
- Antisexualism
- History of human sexuality
- Human female sexuality
- Human male sexuality
- Human mating strategies
- Neuroscience and sexual orientation
- Sex magic
- Sexology
- Sexual practices between men
- Sexual practices between women
- Sexualization
- Sex-positive feminism
- Sex-positive movement
- Sociosexuality
- Strategic pluralism
- Waist to hip ratio
