= Curial response to Catholic sexual abuse cases =

The Curial response to Catholic sexual abuse cases was a significant part of the Church's response to Catholic sexual abuse cases. Its policies have shifted from favoring secrecy in the 20th century to active reform and apologies in the 21st century. Under the recent leadership of Pope Francis, the issue had been addressed through direct instructions to report cases of sexual abuse and revoking the former policies of secrecy.

== 20th century policy ==
=== Crimen sollicitationis (1922–2001) ===
In 2003, a 1962 document was discovered in the Vatican's archives, titled "Crimen sollicitationis" (Instruction on the Manner of Proceeding in Cases of Solicitation) written by Cardinal Alfredo Ottaviani, the Secretary of the Holy Office, issued an instruction regarding the disciplinary procedures for dealing with solicitation by priests during the Sacrament of Penance. The document dealt with any priest who "tempts a penitent... in the act of sacramental confession... towards impure or obscene matters." It directed that investigation of allegations of solicitation in the confessional and the trials of accused priests be conducted in secrecy. It repeated, with additions, the contents of an identically named instruction issued in 1922 by the same office. Crimen sollicitationis remained in effect until 18 May 2001, when it was replaced by new norms promulgated by the papal motu proprio Sacramentorum sanctitatis tutela of 30 April of the same year.

Some parties interpreted the document to be a directive from the Vatican to keep all allegations of sexual abuse secret, leading to widespread media coverage of its contents. Lawyers for some of those making abuse allegations claimed that the document demonstrated a systematic conspiracy to conceal such crimes. The Vatican responded that the document was not only widely misinterpreted, but moreover had been superseded by more recent guidelines in the 1960s and 1970s, and especially the 1983 Code of Canon Law.

=== Early Wojtyła/Ratzinger policy (1978–2001) ===
In the book version of his 2019 film The Two Popes, New Zealand journalist and filmmaker Anthony McCarten described the Vatican's policy during the tenures of Pope John Paul II (Karol Józef Wojtyła; 1978–2005) and Joseph Ratzinger as Prefect of the Congregation for the Doctrine of the Faith (1981–2005; the later Pope Benedict XVI) as follows: 'Rather than excommunicating and bringing to justice those accused after an open investigation, the Vatican refused to divulge information to aid criminal investigations, blocked several internal inquiries, and in countless cases moved priests accused of abuse to new parishes or quietly reinstated those who had been forced by bishops to stand down from their positions.'

== Late Wojtyła/Ratzinger policy (2001–2005) ==
Starting with his April 2001 letter, Pope John Paul II (Karol Józef Wojtyła) and the curia undertook several steps to change the Vatican's policy to child sexual abuse by Catholic clergymen.

=== 2001 papal letter ===
On April 30, 2001, Pope John Paul II issued a letter stating that "a sin against the Sixth Commandment of the Decalogue by a cleric with a minor under 18 years of age is to be considered a grave sin, or 'delictum gravius.'"

John F. Allen Jr., Vatican correspondent for the National Catholic Reporter, has commented that many American Catholics saw the Vatican's initial silence on the Boston Globe stories as showing a lack of concern or awareness about the issue. However, Allen said that, he doesn't know anyone in the Roman Curia, who was not, in the least, horrified "by the revelations that came out of the Globe and elsewhere" or "would defend Cardinal Law’s handling of the cases in Boston" or "would defend the rather shocking lack of oversight that revealed itself" though "they might have different analyses of what should have happened to him". Allen described the Vatican's perspective as being somewhat skeptical of the media handling of the scandal.

In addition, he asserted that the Vatican viewed American cultural attitudes toward sexuality as being somewhat hysterical as well as exhibiting a lack of understanding of the Catholic Church;

No one [in the Vatican] thinks the sexual abuse of kids is unique to the States, but they do think that the reporting on it is uniquely American, fueled by anti-Catholicism and shyster lawyers hustling to tap the deep pockets of the church. And that thinking is tied to the larger perception about American culture, which is that there is a hysteria when it comes to anything sexual, and an incomprehension of the Catholic Church. What that means is that Vatican officials are slower to make the kinds of public statements that most American Catholics want, and when they do make them they are tentative and halfhearted. It's not that they don't feel bad for the victims, but they think the clamor for them to apologize is fed by other factors that they don't want to capitulate to.

=== New rules regarding ordination (2002–2005) ===
In June 2002, the Charter for the Protection of Children and Young People was adopted by the United States Conference of Catholic Bishops (USCCB). Because a significant majority of victims were teenage boys, the Vatican instituted reforms to prevent future United States abuse by requiring background checks for Church employees and issued new rules disallowing ordination of men with "deep-seated homosexual tendencies". They now require dioceses faced with an allegation to alert the authorities, conduct an investigation and remove the accused from duty.

=== 2003 Vatican Conference on Sexual Abuse ===
In April 2003, the Pontifical Academy for Life organized a three-day conference, entitled "Abuse of Children and Young People by Catholic Priests and Religious", where eight non-Catholic psychiatric experts were invited to speak to near all Vatican dicasteries' representatives. The panel of experts identified the following factors contributing to the sexual abuse problem.

- Failure by the hierarchy to grasp the seriousness of the problem.
- Overemphasis on the need to avoid a scandal.
- Use of unqualified treatment centers.
- Misguided willingness to forgive.
- Insufficient accountability.

== Benedict XVI policy (2005–2013) ==
=== 2009 statement at UN Human Rights Council in Geneva ===
In a statement, read out by Archbishop Silvano Maria Tomasi at a meeting of the UN human rights council in Geneva on 22 September 2009, the Holy See stated that the majority of Catholic clergy who had committed acts of sexual abuse against under 18 year olds should not be viewed as paedophiles but homosexuals who are attracted to sex with adolescent males.

The statement said that rather than pedophilia, it would "be more correct" to speak of ephebophilia; being a homosexual attraction to adolesant males ....... "Of all priests involved in the abuses, 80 to 90% belong to this sexual orientation minority which is sexually engaged with adolescent boys between the ages of 11 and 17."

The move angered many gay rights organizations, who claimed it was an attempt by the Vatican to redefine the Church's past problems with pedophilia as problems with homosexuality.

== Francis policy (2013–present) ==
=== 2019 Vatican sexual abuse summit ===
From 21 to 24 February 2019, a four-day Catholic Church summit meeting was held in Vatican City, called the Meeting on the Protection of Minors in the Church (Italian: Incontro su “La Protezione dei Minori nella Chiesa”) with the participation of the presidents of all the episcopal conferences of the world to discuss preventing sexual abuse by Catholic Church clergy.

=== 2019 Vatican norms ===
On March 26, 2019, one month after the summit was held, Pope Francis adopted:

- Vatican Law No. CCXCVII On the protection of minors and vulnerable persons;
- the Motu Proprio On the protection of minors and vulnerable persons;
- the Guidelines of the Vicariate of Vatican City on the protection of minors and vulnerable persons.

According to Andrea Tornielli, these:

are very specific laws, norms and indications destined, first of all, for those to whom they are addressed: in fact, they concern only Vatican City State, where a large number of priests and religious work, but where there are very few children. Although they have been conceived and written for a unique reality, in which the highest religious authority is also the sovereign and legislator, these three documents contain exemplary indications that take into account the most advanced international parameters."

Law No. CCXCVII requiries Vatican City officials, including those in the Roman Curia, and diplomatic personnel of the Holy See, such as the Apostolic Nuncios, to report sex abuse. Failure to do so can result in a fine of up to 5,000 euros (about $5,600) or, in the case of a Vatican gendarme, up to six months in prison. In addition, all crimes related to child abuse, including mistreatment, are prosecutable “ex officio”, even when the purported victim does not file an official report. The law also extends the statute of limitations to 20-year prescription that, in the case of and offence against a minor, begin to count from on his or her eighteenth birthday. In addition, the Governorate of the Vatican City State is required to set up, within the Vatican Department of Health and Welfare, service to support and assist the victims of abuse, providing them with medical and psychological assistance and informing them of their rights and of how to enforce them.

The motu proprio extends the application of the Vatican law to the Roman Curia and its personnel. It requires that, when recruiting staff, the candidate's suitability to interact with minors must be ascertained.

The Guidelines for the Vicariate of Vatican City are addressed to the canons, parish priests and coadjutors of the two parishes located within the Vatican, as well as to the priests, deacons and educators of the Saint Pius X Pre-Seminary, to all the religious men and women who reside in the Vatican, and to all those who work within the ecclesiastical community of the Vicariate of Vatican City. The guidelines require that, in the course of pastoral activities, those persons must always be visible to others when they are in the presence of minors, and that it is strictly forbidden to establish a preferential relationship with a single minor, to address a minor in an offensive way or to engage in inappropriate or sexually allusive conduct, to ask a minor to keep a secret, to photograph or to film a minor without the written consent of his parents. The Vicar of Vatican City has also the obligation to report to the Promoter of Justice any news of abuse that is not manifestly unfounded, and to remove the alleged perpetrator of the abuse from pastoral activities as a precautionary measure.

=== 2019 motu proprio Vos estis lux mundi ===
On May 9, 2019, Pope Francis issued the Motu Proprio Vos estis lux mundi requiring both clerics and religious brothers and sisters, including Bishops, throughout the world to report sex abuse cases and sex abuse cover-ups by their superiors. Under the new Motu Proprio, all Catholic dioceses throughout the world are required to establish stable mechanisms or systems through which people may submit reports of abuse or its cover-up by June 2020. All metropolitan Archdioceses are also required to send reports to the Holy See on the progress of the investigation, whether in their Archdiocese or suffragan dioceses, every 30 days and to complete the investigation within 90 days unless granted an extension. The law is effective for a 3-year experimental period with a vacatio legis of 1 June 2019. According to Canon law professor Kurt Martens:

This new law is without a doubt a rare gift to the entire church and sets, along with the companion Vatican law providing for jail time for any public official of the Vatican who fails to report abuse, an unmistakable new course. The painful, sometimes bitter, experience of the church in the United States and the voices of the faithful worldwide have helped bring about a change in attitude and a change in law. There is no turning back now, and the tone has been set for the future.

=== 2019 rescript "On the confidentiality of legal proceedings" ===
On December 17, 2019 Pope Francis issued a canon law instruction "On the confidentiality of legal proceedings" lifting the "pontifical secret" in the cases relating to: "violence or abuse of authority in forcing sexual acts, sexual abuse of minors or vulnerable persons, crimes of paedophilia involving children under 18 years of age or with incapacitated subjects" and the concealment of those conducts from ecclesiastical or civil inquiries. Under the new provisions, all the stages of the canonical trials are excluded from the pontifical secret, "from the denunciation, to the phase of the preliminary investigations, to the phase of the proper debate," and up to the final decision, as well as any witness statements and documents produced in trial. "It concerns both the procedures that take place at the local level, and those that take place in Rome, at the Congregation for the Doctrine of the Faith."

The instruction provides however that the information obtained in a canonical trial be treated in such a way as to ensure its security, integrity and confidentiality with a view to protecting the good name, image and privacy of all persons involved. According to Archbishop Juan Ignacio Arrieta, Secretary of the Pontifical Council for Legislative Texts: "the fact that knowledge of these criminal actions is no longer bound by the “pontifical secret” does not mean that it provides the freedom to make it public by those in possession of it, which in addition to being immoral, would undermine the right to a good reputation". Moreover, the Instruction does not in any way counter the absolute duty of the Priest to observe the sacramental seal nor the duty of observe the confidentiality of information acquired outside of confession within the whole forum called "extra-sacramental".

The professional secrecy of those involved in a canonical trial should not constitute an obstacle to “the fulfilment of the obligations laid down in all places by the laws of the State, including any reporting obligations [of possible news of a crime], and the execution of the enforcement requests of the civil courts which, naturally, could oblige the delivery" of documentary material to the civil courts. In this regard, Prof. Giuseppe Dalla Torre, former president of the Vatican City State Tribunal, observed that:

Should the State law provide for the obligation to report on the part of those who are informed of the facts, the removal of papal secrecy and the clarification of the limits of official secrecy allow the fulfilment of the provisions of the law, thus promoting full cooperation with the civil authorities and avoiding unlawful incursions of civil authority in the canonical sphere. The same is true of executive measures of the state judicial authority, the non-compliance with which would subject – among other things – the competent ecclesiastical authority to serious sanctions for violation of criminal law.

According to Archbishop Charles Scicluna, adjunct secretary of the Congregation for the Doctrine of the Faith, the abolition of pontifical secrecy means that:

The documents in a penal trial are not public domain, but they are available for authorities, or people who are interested parties, and authorities who have a statutory jurisdiction over the matter. So I think that when it comes, for example, to information that the Holy See has asked to share, one has to follow the international rules: that is, that there has to be a specific request, and that all the formalities of international law are to be followed. But otherwise, on the local level, although they are not public domain, communication with statutory authorities and the sharing of information and documentation are facilitated.

Prof. Dalla Torre underlined that this instruction is a canonical instrument which does not affect the application of the civil laws, as it regards the conduction of the trials and the cooperation with ecclesiastica authorities:

It has been said that the Instruction is an internal act of the Church, but with repercussions outside the canonical order. It is obvious, however, to specify that, as far as the exercise of secular justice in the matter in question is concerned, it will be necessary to adhere the internal legislation of each State. For example, in the case of systems that provide for the prosecution of crimes of abuse only on complaint by one party, the fall of papal secrecy and, in the sense mentioned, of official secrecy, can only operate once the injured party has activated criminal proceedings with the due request to the judicial authority to proceed against the perpetrator of the crime. Furthermore: in the States with a concordatory regime, the new pontifical provisions will be implemented in harmony with the specific norms eventually in force for the protection of the sacred ministry. Finally, there remains a fundamental difference depending on whether the requests of the civil authorities are addressed to the local ecclesiastical authorities (Bishops, Major Superiors in the case of religious), or to the Holy See and, more precisely, to the Congregation for the Doctrine of the Faith. In the latter case, in fact, they must take place through those forms of judicial cooperation between different jurisdictional authorities, for the performance of activities relating to a process (such as the assumption of information or documents, etc.), known as letters rogatory. In the first case, instead, such requests will take place according to the internal provisions of the individual state systems. Certainly, in both cases, the proceeding civil authority will have to formulate the requests with detailed, precise and not generic indications, but this is a problem entirely internal to the state systems, which falls outside the sphere of competence of the canonical system.

=== 2020 Vatican report on Theodore McCarrick ===
In October 2018, the Holy See announced that it would conduct an investigation into how allegations against Theodore McCarrick, a former cardinal and Catholic Archbishop of Washington, D.C. from 2001 to 2006, who was laicized in February 2019, following credible allegations of repeated sexual misconduct towards children and seminarians, were handled. The Report was published on Tuesday, Nov. 10, at 2p.m. local time in Rome, under the title "Report on the Holy See’s institutional knowledge and decision-making process related to former Cardinal Theodore Edgar McCarrick (from 1930 to 2017)." Summarizing the key findings of the Report, Andrea Tornielli said:

At the time of Theodore McCarrick’s appointment as Archbishop of Washington in 2000, the Holy See acted on the basis of partial and incomplete information. What has now come to light are omissions, underestimations, and choices that later proved to be wrong, due in part to the fact that, during the assessment process requested by Rome at the time, those questioned did not always disclose all they knew. Until 2017, there had never been any precise accusation regarding sexual abuse or harassment or harm done to a minor. As soon as the first report was received from a victim who was a minor at the time the abuse was committed, Pope Francis reacted promptly regarding the elderly cardinal, who had already retired as head of the archdiocese in 2006, first taking away his red hat and then dismissing him from the clerical state. This is what emerges from the Report on the Holy See’s Institutional Knowledge and Decision-Making Related to Former Cardinal Theodore Edgar McCarrick (1930 to 2017) published by the Secretariat of State.

== Papal apologies (2003–present) ==
=== John Paul II ===
In 2003, Pope John Paul II stated that "there is no place in the priesthood and religious life for those who would harm the young".

=== Benedict XVI ===
Pope Benedict XVI has apologized for the sexual abuse of minors by Catholic clergy.

On July 19, 2008, the Pope made a historic full apology for child sexual abuse by priests and clergymen in Australia. Before a 3,400 congregation assembled in Sydney's St. Mary's Cathedral, Pope Benedict called for compensation and demanded punishment for those guilty of the "evil":

Here I would like to pause to acknowledge the shame which we have all felt as a result of the sexual abuse of minors by some clergy and religious in this country. I am deeply sorry for the pain and suffering the victims have endured and I assure them that, as their pastor, I too share in their suffering. ... Victims should receive compassion and care, and those responsible for these evils must be brought to justice. These misdeeds, which constitute so grave a betrayal of trust, deserve unequivocal condemnation. I ask all of you to support and assist your bishops, and to work together with them in combating this evil. It is an urgent priority to promote a safer and more wholesome environment, especially for young people.

On July 21, he met with two male and two female victims of sexual abuse by priests, listened to their stories and celebrated Mass with them. The Premier of New South Wales Morris Iemma said "Hopefully it will be a sign of righting the wrongs of the past and of a better future and better treatment by the church of the victims and their families." The victims' rights advocacy group Broken Rites welcomed the Pope's apology, but expressed disappointment that the Pope had not made his apology directly to sexual abuse victims and criticized the selection of the victims as having been hand-picked to be cooperative.

I'm afraid that what they've done is selected victims who have agreed with what the Church's policies are. The Pope should have met with Anthony Foster, the father of two girls abused by a priest, who cut short a holiday in Britain to return to Australia in the hope of meeting the pontiff.

=== Francis ===
In August 2018, Pope Francis apologized in a 2,000 word letter after the release of a grand jury report confirming that over 1,000 children were sexually abused by "predator priests" in Pennsylvania for decades, incidents often covered up by the Church.

"With shame and repentance, we acknowledge as an ecclesial community that we were not where we should have been, that we did not act in a timely manner, realizing the magnitude and the gravity of the damage done to so many lives ... We showed no care for the little ones; we abandoned them ... The heart-wrenching pain of these victims, which cries out to heaven, was long ignored, kept quiet or silenced."

The Pope said the church was developing a "zero tolerance" policy on abuse (which he called "crimes") and cover-ups. Vatican spokesman Greg Burke emphasized that the Pope's apology is not specific to any geographic area. "Pope Francis has written to the people of God and that means everyone."

== Relations between the Vatican and American Catholics ==
According to John Allen Jr., Vatican correspondent for the National Catholic Reporter, cultural differences between the Vatican and American Catholics complicated the process of formulating a comprehensive response to the sexual abuse scandal. Allen asserted that the sexual abuse crisis illustrated that "there is a lot about the American culture and the American Church that puzzles people in the Vatican, and there is much about the Vatican that puzzles Americans and English speakers generally."

== See also ==
- Jeffrey Lena, the lawyer representing the Vatican in the US
- Liber Gomorrhianus

Church related:

- Criticism of Pope John Paul II
- Sexual abuse scandal in the English Benedictine Congregation
- Pontifical Commission for the Protection of Minors
- Pontifical secret
- VIRTUS
- Homosexuality and Roman Catholic priesthood

Anti-abuse:

- National Society for the Prevention of Cruelty to Children (NSPCC)
- Survivors Network of those Abused by Priests (SNAP)

General:

- Institutional abuse
- Religious abuse
- Spiritual abuse
