= Child sexuality =

Sexuality of children

Sexual behaviors in children are common, and may range from normal and developmentally appropriate to abusive. These behaviors may include self-stimulation, interest in sex, curiosity about their own or other genders, exhibitionism (the display of one's body to another child or an adult), voyeurism (attempts at seeing the body of another child or an adult), gender role behaviors, and engagement in interpersonal sexual acts.

More than 50% of children will engage in a form of sexual behavior before the age of 13 (around puberty), including sexual experiences with other children. These experiences can include fondling, interpersonal genital exploration and masturbation; while intrusive contact (digital penetration, oral or genito-genital contact, etc.) is more rare.

== Sexual behaviors ==
=== Curiosity ===
Although there are variations between individual children, children are generally curious about their bodies and those of others and explore their bodies through explorative sex play. "Playing doctor" is one example of such childhood exploration; such games are generally considered to be normal in young children. Child sexuality is considered fundamentally different from adult sexual behavior, which is more goal-driven. Among children, genital penetration and oral-genital contact are very uncommon, and may be perceived as imitations of adult behaviors. Such behaviors are more common among children who have been sexually abused.

According to the National Child Traumatic Stress Network, children have a natural curiosity about their own bodies and the bodies of others that ought to be addressed in an age-appropriate manner. According to the report:

- Children less than four years old will sometimes touch their own private parts or look at the private parts of others.
- From the ages of three to seven, children are typically curious about where babies come from. They may explore other children's and adults' bodies out of curiosity and also begin to have a sense of learned modesty and of the differences between private and public behaviors. For some children, genital touching increases, especially when they are tired or upset. They may attempt to see others dressing or undressing or will perhaps "play doctor".
- Between ages six and twelve, children may start to expand their curiosity to images of undressed people available in the media. They may develop a need for privacy regarding their own bodies and begin to be sexually attracted to peers.

=== Masturbation ===
Some children partake in genital stimulation at an early age. By the age of 8 or 9, some children become aware that sexual arousal is a specific type of erotic sensation and will seek these pleasurable experiences through various sights, self-touches, and fantasy.

=== Interpersonal sexual experiences ===
Many children take part in some sex play, typically with siblings or friends. Sex play with others usually decreases as children go through their elementary school years, yet they still may possess romantic interest in their peers. Curiosity levels remain high during these years, escalating in puberty (roughly the teenage years) when the main surge in sexual interest occurs.

Mutual masturbation or other sexual experimentation between adolescents of similar ages may also occur, though cultural or religious coercion may inhibit or encourage concealment of such activity if there is negative peer pressure or if authority figures are likely to disapprove.

A 1997 study based on limited variables found no correlation between early childhood (age 6 and under) peer sexual play and later adjustment. The study notes that its results do not demonstrate conclusively that no such correlation exists. The study also does not address the question of consequences of intense sexual experiences or aggressive or unwanted experiences.

A Finnish study found that 2.4% of its respondents had sexual experiences with someone at least five years older during childhood. The disclosure of such experiences to adults or peers was conditioned largely by whether violence was employed during the act and the quality of the experience (participants who did not label the experience as abuse, which represented 51% of the sample, were less likely to report it to adults, but not peers).

=== Discovery of sex differences ===
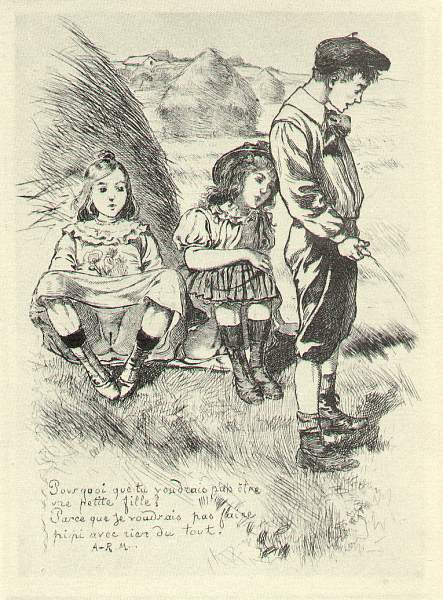
"Why do you not want to be a girl? Because I do not want to pee with nothing." Illustration by Martin van Maële in La Grande Danse macabre des vifs, 1905.

With the passage of time, children become more aware of sex differences, and tend to choose same-sex friends and playmates, sometimes disparaging the opposite sex. Children may drop their close attachment to their opposite-sex parent and become more attached to their same-sex parent.

During this time, children, especially girls, show increased awareness of social norms regarding sex, nudity, and privacy. Children may use sexual terms to test adult reaction. "Bathroom humor" (jokes and conversation relating to excretory functions), present in earlier stages, continues.

As this stage progresses, the choices of children picking same-sex friends becomes more marked and extends to disparagement of the opposite sex.

== Sexual development ==
=== Childcare ===
In childcare settings outside the home there is difficulty in determining what behavior is normal and what may be indicative of child sexual abuse (CSA). In 2018 an extensive study of Danish childcare institutions (which had, in the prior century, been tolerant of child nudity and playing doctor) found that contemporary policy had become restrictive as the result of childcare workers being charged with CSA. However, while CSA does occur, the response may be due to "moral panic" that is out of proportion with its actual frequency and over-reaction may have unintended consequences. Strict policies are being implemented not to protect children from a rare threat, but to protect workers from the accusation of CSA. The policies have created a split between childcare workers who continue to believe that behaviors involving nudity are a normal part of child development and those that advocate that children be closely supervised to prohibit such behavior.

== Research ==
Studies on children's sexual behaviors are scarce. Empirical knowledge about child sexual behavior is not usually gathered by direct interviews of children, partly due to ethical consideration. Information about child sexual behavior is gathered by observing children being treated for problematic behavior, such as use of force in sex play, often using anatomically correct dolls; Recollections by adults and observation by caregivers.

Most published sexual research material emanates from the Western world.

=== Early 20th century ===
Until Sigmund Freud published his Three Essays on the Theory of Sexuality in 1905, children were often regarded as asexual, having no sexuality until later development. Freud was one of the first researchers to seriously study child sexuality, and his acknowledgment of its existence was a significant change.

Aside from Freud, the modern shift from childhood sexuality being understood as a pathological concept to a normal part of child behavior was also influenced by Albert Moll, Carl Jung, William Stern and Charlotte Bühler. Although Freud is usually regarded as the central figure in the "discovery of childhood sexuality", his work was influenced by an already existing discussion around this topic that started in the second half of the 19th century.

==== Kinsey ====
Alfred Kinsey in the Kinsey Reports (1948 and 1953) included research on the physical sexual response of children, including pre-pubescent children (though the main focus of the reports was adults). While there were initially concerns that some of the data in his reports could not have been obtained without observation of or participation in child sexual abuse, the data was revealed much later in the 1990s to have been gathered from the diary of a single pedophile who had been molesting children since 1917. This effectively rendered the data-set nearly worthless, not only because it relied entirely on a single source, but the data was hearsay reported by a highly unreliable observer. In 2000, Swedish researcher Ing-Beth Larsson noted, "It is quite common for references still to cite Alfred Kinsey", due to the scarcity of subsequent large-scale studies of child sexual behavior.

== Contemporary issues ==
In the latter part of the 20th century, sexual liberation probably arose in the context of a massive cultural explosion in the United States of America following the upheaval of the Second World War, and the vast quantity of audiovisual media distributed worldwide by the new electronic and information technology. Children are apt to gain access and be influenced by material, despite censorship and content-control software.

=== Sex education ===
The extent of sex education in public schools varies widely around the world, and within countries such as the United States where course content is determined by individual school districts.

A series of sex education videos from Norway, intended for 8–12 year olds, includes explicit information and images of reproduction, anatomy, and the changes that are normal with the approach of puberty. Rather than diagrams or photos, the videos are shot in a locker room with live nude people of all ages. The presenter, a physician, is relaxed about close examination and touching of relevant body parts, including genitals. While the videos note that the age of consent in Norway is 16, abstinence is not emphasized. As of 2015, however, 37 U.S. states required that sex education curricula include lessons on abstinence and 25 required that a "just say no" approach be stressed. Studies show that early and complete sex education does not increase the likelihood of becoming sexually active, but leads to better health outcomes overall.

=== Social media's role on child sexuality ===
The impact of social media on adolescent sexuality is a multifaceted concern requiring ongoing research for a comprehensive understanding. Research suggests that exposure to sexual content on social media can influence adolescents' sexual attitudes, beliefs, and behaviors, given their vulnerable state during this developmental period when gender roles, sexual attitudes, and behaviors are actively being shaped. Studies have identified a positive association between high-frequency social media use and increased sexual risk behaviors among adolescents.

Exposure to sexual displays on social media sites has been linked to problematic beliefs and behaviors among both content creators and viewers, particularly affecting adolescents who are more susceptible to these effects and may encourage risky sexual behavior, associated with an increase in sexually transmitted infection rates and unintended pregnancies. Social media can have both positive and negative effects on the sexual orientation of children and adolescents. For instance, it may provide a safe space for sexual identity exploration and expression for LGBTQ+ youth, fostering connectivity, social support, and positive impacts on well-being. While early adopters of the LGBTQ+ identity within the youth use social media to understand their sexuality and connect with like-minded individuals, contributing to improved emotional support and development, it's important to note that social media can also expose children to inaccurate and potentially harmful information about sexuality, perpetuate risky sexual behaviors, and provide anonymity to potential dangers, further covered in the proceeding sections.

=== Sexualization of children ===
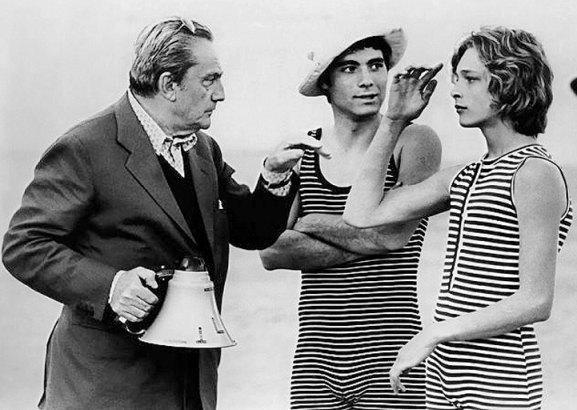
Luchino Visconti, Sergio Garfagnoli and Björn Andrésen during the filming of Death in Venice in 1970

Over recent decades, children have been subject to a premature sexualization, as indicated by a level of sexual knowledge or sexual behavior not previously normal for their age group. The causes of this premature sexualization that have been cited include portrayals in the media of sex and related issues, especially in media aimed at children; the marketing of products with sexual connotations to children, including clothing; the lack of parental oversight and discipline; access to adult culture via the internet; and the lack of comprehensive school sex education programs. For girls and young women in particular, studies have found that sexualization has a negative impact on their "self-image and healthy development".

The cinema industry has frequently received accusations of sexualizing minors, objectifying the bodies of young girls, and reinforcing sexist attitudes among children. Advertisers often portray young girls as older than their actual age and engaging in behaviors associated with adult women. Child actors occasionally disagree with the use of their likeness by media executives; Brooke Shields unsuccessfully tried to stop nude photographs of her from publication and Björn Andrésen felt that director Luchino Visconti sexualized his appearance following the release of Death in Venice. In 2017, Finn Wolfhard received numerous sexualized comments from media executives and asked interviewers to stop making these statements in public.

Social media has been associated with an increase in child sexual exploitation and abuse. Reports indicate that social media platforms have become a pipeline for the rapid spread of child sexual abuse material (CSAM), leading to an alarming increase in the dissemination of such content. Further, child predators use social media to identify and groom potential victims, and the closed or private social media groups enable them to connect with like-minded peers and trade tips on how to secretly record and share CSAM.

=== Child sexual abuse ===
Child sexual abuse is defined as an adult or older adolescent having a sexual relationship with a child. Effects of child sexual abuse include clinical depression, post-traumatic stress disorder, anxiety, propensity to further victimization in adulthood, and physical injury to the child, among other problems.

Child sexual abuse by a family member is a form of incest, and can result in more serious and long-term psychological trauma, especially in the case of parental incest.

Children who have been the victim of child sexual abuse sometimes display overly sexualized behavior, which may be defined as expressed behavior that is non-normative for the culture. Typical symptomatic behaviors may include excessive or public masturbation and coercing, manipulating or tricking other children into non-consensual or unwanted sexual activities, also referred to as "child-on-child sexual abuse". Sexualized behavior is thought to constitute the best indication that a child has been sexually abused.

Children who exhibit sexualized behavior may also have other behavioral problems. Other symptoms of child sexual abuse may include manifestations of post-traumatic stress in younger children; fear, aggression, and nightmares in young school-age children; and depression in older children.

==== Among siblings ====
In 1980, a survey of 796 undergraduates, 15 percent of females and 10 percent of males reported some form of sexual experience involving a sibling; most of these fell short of actual intercourse. Approximately one quarter of these experiences were described as abusive or exploitative. A 1989 paper reported the results of a questionnaire with responses from 526 undergraduate college students in which 17 percent of the respondents stated that they had preadolescent sexual experiences with a sibling.

== See also ==
- Adolescent sexuality
- Age of consent
- Developmental psychology
- Genital play
- Playing doctor
