= Queers in History =

LGBT encyclopedia by Keith Stern

Queers in History: The Comprehensive Encyclopedia of Historical Gays, Lesbians and Bisexuals
- 2009 edition cover
- Author: Keith Stern
- Subject: LGBT history
- Genre: Encyclopedia
- Publisher: Benbella Books
- Pages: 587 (U.S. trade paperback)
- ISBN: 1-933771-87-9
- OCLC: 317453194

Queers in History: The Comprehensive Encyclopedia of Historical Gays, Lesbians and Bisexuals is an encyclopedia written by Keith Stern of historically prominent people who were lesbian, gay, bisexual, transgender or queer (LGBTQ).

It was first published on diskette in early 1993, and in an expanded CD-ROM format by the end of 1994. It was one of the first new media titles to be distributed through bookstores. It was available in over 600 independent bookstores worldwide, and at selected locations of leading book selling chains in the UK and US. It went out of print in 1996.

A new, completely revised edition was published as a trade paperback by BenBella Books in September 2009. It features a foreword by Ian McKellen.

== Editions ==
- Stern, Keith; McKellen, Ian (2009). Queers in History: The Comprehensive Encyclopedia of Historical Gays, Lesbians and Bisexuals. Dallas, Texas: BenBella. ISBN 978-1-933771-87-8.
