= Jeffrey Lena =

Jeffrey Stanley Lena (born 1958) is an American lawyer based in Berkeley, California, who represents the Holy See in civil lawsuits in the United States. Some such suits accuse the Vatican of complicity in sexual abuse by priests and money laundering. He has also been involved in protecting the Vatican Museums' copyrights. In 2000 he successfully defended the Vatican against a lawsuit filed by Holocaust survivors from Croatia, Ukraine, and Yugoslavia that claimed that the Vatican Bank accepted millions of dollars of their valuables stolen by Nazi sympathizers.

He grew up in Berkeley, California. He graduated from the University of California, Santa Cruz and did graduate work in history at the University of California, Berkeley. He studied law at the University of California College of the Law, San Francisco, and at the University of Milan.
