= Three Essays on the Theory of Sexuality =

1905 work by Sigmund Freud

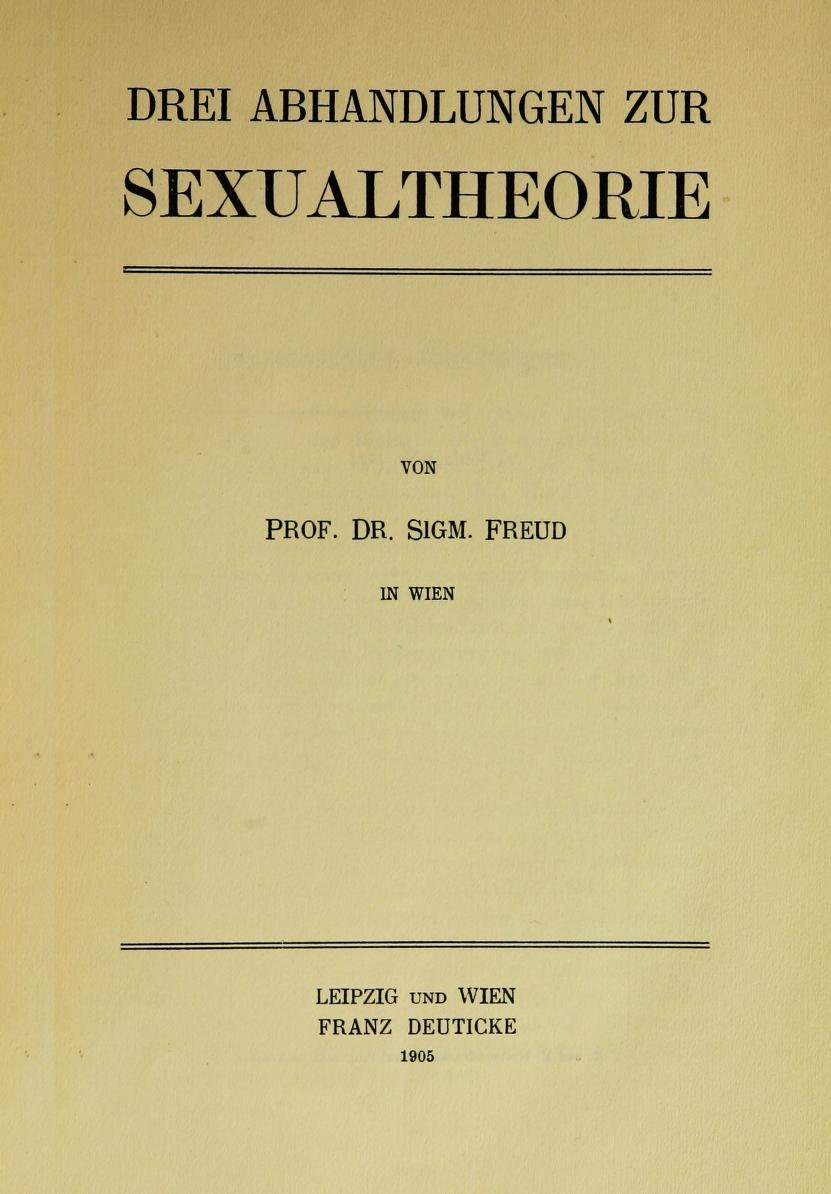
- Author: Sigmund Freud
- Original title: Drei Abhandlungen zur Sexualtheorie
- Translator: James Strachey
- Subject: Human sexuality
- Published: 1905
- Media type: Print
- Text: Three Essays on the Theory of Sexuality at Wikisource

Three Essays on the Theory of Sexuality (German: Drei Abhandlungen zur Sexualtheorie), sometimes titled Three Contributions to the Theory of Sex, is a 1905 work by Sigmund Freud, the founder of psychoanalysis, in which the author advances his theory of sexuality, in particular its relation to childhood.

== Synopsis ==
Freud's book covered three main areas: sexual perversions; childhood sexuality; and puberty.

=== The Sexual Aberrations ===
Freud began his first essay, on "The Sexual Aberrations", by distinguishing between the sexual object and the sexual aim—noting that deviations from the norm could occur with respect to both. The sexual object is therein defined as a desired object, and the sexual aim as what acts are desired with said object.

Discussing the choice of children and animals as sex objects—pedophilia and bestiality—he notes that most people would prefer to limit these perversions to the insane "on aesthetic grounds" but that they exist in normal people also. He also explores deviations of sexual aims, as in the tendency to linger over preparatory sexual aspects such as looking and touching.

Turning to neurotics, Freud emphasised that "in them tendencies to every kind of perversion can be shown to exist as unconscious forces...neurosis is, as it were, the negative of perversion". Freud also makes the point that people who are behaviorally abnormal are always sexually abnormal in his experience but that many people who are normal behaviorally otherwise are sexually abnormal also.

Freud concluded that "a disposition to perversions is an original and universal disposition of the human sexual instinct and that...this postulated constitution, containing the germs of all the perversions, will only be demonstrable in children".

=== Infantile Sexuality ===
His second essay, on "Infantile Sexuality", argues that children have sexual urges, from which adult sexuality only gradually emerges via psychosexual development.

Looking at children, Freud identified many forms of infantile sexual emotions, including thumb sucking, autoeroticism, and sibling rivalry.

=== The Transformations of Puberty ===
In his third essay, "The Transformations of Puberty", Freud formalised the distinction between the 'fore-pleasures' of infantile sexuality and the 'end-pleasure' of sexual intercourse.

He also demonstrated how the adolescent years consolidate sexual identity under the dominance of the genitals.

=== Summary ===
Freud sought to link to his theory of the unconscious put forward in The Interpretation of Dreams (1899) and his work on hysteria by positing sexuality as the driving force of both neuroses (through repression) and perversion.

In its final version, the "Three Essays" also included the concepts of penis envy, castration anxiety, and the Oedipus complex.

== Textual history ==
=== In German language ===
The Three Essays underwent a series of rewritings and additions over a twenty-year succession of editions—changes which expanded its size by one half, from 80 to 120 pages. The sections on the sexual theories of children and on pregenitality only appeared in 1915, for example, while such central terms as castration complex or penis envy were also later additions.

As Freud himself conceded in 1923, the result was that "it may often have happened that what was old and what was more recent did not admit of being merged into an entirely uncontradictory whole", so that, whereas at first "the accent was on a portrayal of the fundamental difference between the sexual life of children and of adults", subsequently "we were able to recognize the far-reaching approximation of the final outcome of sexuality in children (in about the fifth year) to the definitive form taken by it in adults".

Jacques Lacan considered such a process of change as evidence of the way that "Freud's thought is the most perennially open to revision...a thought in motion".

=== Translations ===
There are three English translations, one by A. A. Brill in 1910, another by James Strachey in 1949 published by Imago Publishing. Strachey's translation is generally considered superior, including by Freud himself. The third translation, by Ulrike Kistner, was published by Verso Books in 2017. Kistner's translation is at the time of its publishing the only English translation available of the earlier 1905 edition of the Essays. The 1905 edition theorizes an autoerotic theory of sexual development, without recourse to the Oedipal complex.

== See also ==
- Phallic monism
- Polymorphous perversity
- Womb envy
