= Child-on-child sexual abuse =

Sexual abuse between children

Child-on-child sexual abuse, frequently abbreviated to COCSA, is a form of child sexual abuse in which a prepubescent child is sexually abused by one or more other children or adolescents, and in which no adult is directly involved. While this may include one of the children using physical force, threats, trickery or emotional manipulation to elicit cooperation, it also can include non-coercive situations where the initiator proposes or starts a sexual act that the victim does not understand the nature of and simply goes along with, not comprehending its implications or what the consequences might be.

Child-on-child sexual abuse is differentiated from normative sexual play or anatomical curiosity and exploration (e.g. "playing doctor") because child-on-child sexual abuse is an overt and deliberate action often directed at sexual stimulation, including orgasm. Other factors include age difference, frequency, duration, coercion, and appropriateness to a child's developmental level. When sexual abuse is perpetrated by one sibling upon another, it is known as "inter-sibling abuse". When victims of inter-sibling child-on-child sexual abuse grow up, they often have a distorted recollection of the act, such as thinking it was consensual or that they were the initiator.

== Causes ==
In the case of child-on-child sexual abuse, young children who have not matured sexually are incapable of knowing about specific sex acts without an external source. Consequently, children who initiate or solicit overtly sexual acts with other children either have been sexually victimized beforehand (by an adult or another child) or they have been exposed to sexually explicit material. Research shows that about one-third to one-half of children with problematic sexual behaviors have no history of sexual abuse themselves. In many instances, the perpetrating child has been exposed to pornography or repeatedly witnessed sexual activity of adults at a very young age, and this can also be considered a form of child sexual abuse.

In many cases, a child or adolescent may have no intent to cause any harm to another child, and they act merely on a passing impulse. However, this act may still result in harm to the other child and is a form of child-on-child sexual abuse. The peak of common ages for an adolescent to be a perpetrator are around the ages 12-14, Furthermore, children who had experienced an unwanted sexual approach may not understand that this act was a crime against themselves.

In other instances, child-on-child sexual abuse results from hazing rather than eroticism. Numerous cases have emerged involving young male sports players inserting fingers or objects into their teammates' anuses without consent.

== Prevalence ==
Research estimates that over half of child sexual abuse offenses in the United States are committed by perpetrators under the age of 18. However, child-on-child sexual abuse frequently goes unreported because it is not widely known about by the public, and often occurs outside of adults' supervision. Even if known by adults, it is sometimes dismissed as harmless by those who do not understand the implications. In particular, inter-sibling abuse is under-reported relative to the reporting rates for parent–child sexual abuse, and disclosure of the incest by the victim during childhood is rare.

== Effects ==
Children who were sexually victimized by other minors, including inter-sibling abuse, show largely the same problems as children victimized by adults, including anxiety disorders, depression, substance abuse, suicide, eating disorders, post-traumatic stress disorder, sleep disorders and difficulty trusting peers in the context of relationships. The victim often thinks that the act was normal, including thinking they were the initiator or that they went through the act voluntarily.

Major factors that affect the severity of symptoms include the use of force or coercion, the frequency of the abuse, and the invasiveness of the act. An increased risk of victimization later in life has also been reported.

The term minor sex offenders may be used for children under 18 years of age who have initiated any non-consensual sexual activity with another person. This population may be viewed as a younger version of sexual perpetrators and may be assessed as part of the same group when they represent a significant heterogeneous group. For example, these children tend to exhibit different motivations for their actions than adult sexual offenders and they tend to respond more favorably to treatment.

== See also ==
- Age of consent
- Child abuse
- Child sexuality
- Commercial sexual exploitation of children
- Juvenile sex crimes
- Sexual bullying
- Sibling sexual abuse
- Traumatic event
