= Genital play =

Early childhood behavior

Genital play is a common early childhood behavior of genital exploration distinct from autoerotic stimulation. This behavior is part of a normative period of children exploring all parts of their bodies, and some psychologists have even suggested genital play is a sign of healthy psychosexual development. Though genital play may rarely evolve directly into masturbation, the behavior is sometimes misinterpreted directly as masturbation by adults.

Genital play usually begins in some boys between six and seven months of age, and in some girls at ten to eleven months. Genital play may continue during early childhood. When the child is about six years old, a sexual latency period starts in which there could be some private masturbation. The latency phase ends when the child at ten years old enters preadolescence.

== See also ==
- Child sexuality
- Playing doctor
