= Playing doctor =

Juvenile exploratory play

"Playing doctor" is a phrase used colloquially in the Western world to refer to children examining each other's genitals or bodies. It originates from children using the pretend roles of doctor and patient as a pretext for such an examination. However, whether or not such role-playing is involved, the phrase is used to refer to any similar examination.

Playing doctor is considered by most child psychologists to be a normal step in childhood development between the ages of approximately three and six years, so long as all parties are willing participants and relatively close in age. A study by American sexologist Alfred Kinsey published in the book Sexual Behavior in the Human Male (1948) found that 38.6% of all 10-year-old children practice heterosexual and homosexual doctor play. However, it can be a source of discomfort to parents to discover their children are engaging in such an activity. Parenting professionals often advise parents to view such a discovery as an opportunity to calmly teach their children about different sex characteristics, personal privacy, private parts, and respecting the privacy of other children.

Playing doctor is distinguished from child-on-child sexual abuse, as the latter is an exploitative relationship involving sexual stimulation and usually a difference in age or knowledge, rather than playful curiosity.

== See also ==
- Child sexual abuse
- Child sexuality
- Genital play
- Make believe
- Role-playing § Amusement
- Sibling relationship § Among children
