= Biology and sexual orientation =

Field of sexual orientation research

The relationship between biology and sexual orientation is a subject of ongoing research. While scientists do not know the exact cause of sexual orientation, they theorize that it is caused by a complex interplay of genetic, hormonal, and environmental influences. However, evidence is weak for hypotheses that the postnatal social environment impacts sexual orientation, especially for males.

Biological theories for explaining the causes of sexual orientation are favored by scientists. These factors, which may be related to the development of a sexual orientation, include genes, the early uterine environment (such as prenatal hormones), and brain structure. While the evolutionary explanation for heterosexuality in organisms that reproduce sexually is straightforwardly understood to be a psychological adaptation resulting from greater reproductive success, evolutionary explanations for homosexuality rely upon other mechanisms of evolution such as kin selection and inclusive fitness, or antagonistic pleiotropy that favors heterozygotes causing homosexuality among homozygotes as a by-product.

== Scientific research and studies ==
=== Fetal development and hormones ===
The influence of hormones on the developing fetus has been the most influential causal hypothesis of the development of sexual orientation. In simple terms, the developing fetal brain begins in a "female" state. Both INAH3 (the third interstitial nucleus of the anterior hypothalamus) area on the left side of the hypothalamus, which stores gender preference, and the center area of the bed stria terminalis (BSTc) area on the right side of the hypothalamus, which stores gender identity, are undeveloped and function as female. The action of the SRY gene in the Y chromosome in the fetus prompts the development of testes, which release testosterone, the primary androgen receptor-activating hormone, to allow testosterone to enter the cells and masculinize the fetus and fetal brain. If a sufficient amount of testosterone is received by INAH3 at 12 weeks following conception, the testosterone stimulates the enlargement of INAH3, which is known to be involved in directing typical male sex behavior, such as attraction to females. If INAH3 does not receive enough testosterone to override the circulating estrogen, it may not grow to the size typically observed in males. Subsequently, INAH3 may function as female or partially female, potentially causing same-sex attraction to males. Although the size of INAH3 in homosexual men compared to heterosexual men may not be statistically different, homosexual men may have a greater cell density than heterosexual men, though a similar total number of INAH3 neurons.

Raw data
Average volumes of INAH3 in straight and gay men and in women.

Studies have shown that INAH3 in gay men has likely been exposed to lower levels of testosterone in the brain compared to straight men, or had different levels of receptivity to its masculinizing effects, or experienced hormone fluctuations at critical times during fetal development. In women, if INAH3 receives more testosterone than is normal for females, INAH3 may enlarge somewhat or even to the size that is normal for males, increasing the likelihood of same sex attraction. Supporting this are studies of the finger digit ratio of the right hand, which is a robust marker of prenatal testosterone exposure. Lesbians tend to have significantly more masculine digit ratios, a finding which has been replicated in numerous cross-cultural studies. Controlled experiments in animals, where scientists manipulate exposure to sex hormones during gestation, can also induce lifelong male-typical behavior and mounting in females, and female-typical behavior in males.

2D:4D ratio correlation with sexual orientation has been recently researched. In a meta-analysis (Swift-Gallant et al.), digit ratios were more masculine in lesbians and more feminine in gay men. Gay men had more feminine digit ratios on both the right and left hands, contrary to previous analyses, such as Grimbos et al. which found "no association of 2D:4D with male sexual orientation". Although previous studies tended to group bisexual and homosexual individuals as "non-heterosexual", or left them out completely, the Swift-Gallant meta-analysis found that bisexual individuals were more similar to heterosexual individuals in their digit ratios.

Maternal immune responses during fetal development are strongly demonstrated as causing male homosexuality and bisexuality. Research since the 1990s has demonstrated that as a woman has more sons, there is a higher chance of later born sons having same-sex attraction. During pregnancy, male cells enter a mother's bloodstream, which provoke an immune response to neutralize them. These antibodies are then released on future male fetuses and may neutralize Y-linked antigens, which play a role in brain masculinization, leaving areas of the brain responsible for sexual attraction in the female-typical default position, i.e. expressing attraction to men. Each subsequent son will increase the levels of these antibodies, creating the observed fraternal birth order effect. Biochemical evidence to support this effect was confirmed in a lab study in 2017, finding that mothers with a gay son, particularly those with older brothers, had heightened levels of antibodies to the NLGN4Y Y-protein than mothers with heterosexual sons. This effect is estimated to account for between 15 and 29% of gay men, while other gay and bisexual men are thought to owe sexual orientation to genetic and hormonal interactions.

Socialization theories, which were dominant in the 1900s, favored the idea that children were born "undifferentiated" and were socialized into gender roles and sexual orientation. This led to medical experiments in which newborn and infant boys were surgically reassigned into girls after accidents such as botched circumcisions. These males were then reared and raised as females without telling them, but contrary to expectations, this did not make them feminine nor attracted to men. All published cases providing sexual orientation grew up to be strongly attracted to women. The failure of these experiments demonstrate that socialization effects do not induce feminine sexual behavior or psychology in males, and that the organizational effects of hormones on the fetal brain prior to birth have permanent effects. These indicate the primary role of nature, not post-birth nurture, in the development of male sexual orientation.

Raw data
Average volumes of the equivalent cell group in sheep (oSDN) for heterosexual and homosexual rams and for ewes. Sex differences are formed under the influence of prenatal hormones in utero, rather than acquired after birth.

In the brain, the sexually dimorphic nucleus of the preoptic area (SDN-POA) is a key region which differs between males and females in humans and a number of mammals (e.g., sheep/rams, mice, rats), and is caused by sex differences in hormone exposure. Also, the INAH-3 region is bigger in males than in females, and is known to be critical for sexual behavior. Dissection studies found that gay men had significantly smaller INAH-3 than heterosexual men, a shift in the female direction, as first demonstrated by neuroscientist Simon LeVay, which has been replicated. Dissection studies are rare, however, due to lack of funding and brain samples.

Long-term studies of homosexual behavior in domesticated sheep led by Charles Roselli have found that 6-8% of rams have a homosexual preference through their life. Dissection of ram brains also found a similar smaller (feminized) structure in homosexually oriented rams in the brain region equivalent to human SDN, the ovine sexually dimorphic nucleus (oSDN). The size of the sheep oSDN has also been demonstrated to be formed in utero, rather than postnatally, underscoring the role of prenatal hormones in masculinization of the brain for sexual attraction.

Other studies in humans have relied on brain imaging, such as research led by Ivanka Savic which compared hemispheres of the brain. This research found that straight men had right hemispheres 2% larger than the left, described as modest but "highly significant difference" by LeVay. In heterosexual women, the two hemispheres were the same size. In gay men, the two hemispheres were also the same size, or sex atypical, while in lesbians, the right hemispheres were slightly larger than the left, indicating a small shift in the male direction.

A model proposed by evolutionary geneticist William R. Rice argues that a misexpressed epigenetic modifier of testosterone sensitivity or insensitivity that affected development of the brain can explain homosexuality, and can best explain twin discordance. Rice et al. propose that these epimarks normally canalize sexual development, preventing intersex conditions in most of the population, but sometimes failing to erase across generations and causing reversed sexual preference. On grounds of evolutionary plausibility, Gavrilets, Friberg and Rice argue that all mechanisms for exclusive homosexual orientations likely trace back to their epigenetic model. Testing this hypothesis is possible with current stem cell technology.

==== Isolated GRH Deficiency ====
Isolated GRH deficiency (IGD, also known as isolated or idiopathic hypogonadotropic hypogonadism, IHH) also provides evidence of the influence of estrogen on androphilia. Shirazi et al. found that women with IGD reported lower male attraction than typical females. However, IGD did not lead to a complete decrease in attraction to males, possible leading to an elevated proportion of participants with IGD to identify as bisexual in comparison to unaffected females. IGD did not directly decrease libido or other sexual desire. Males with IGD did not differ in sexual orientation from typical males.

=== Prenatal thyroid theory ===
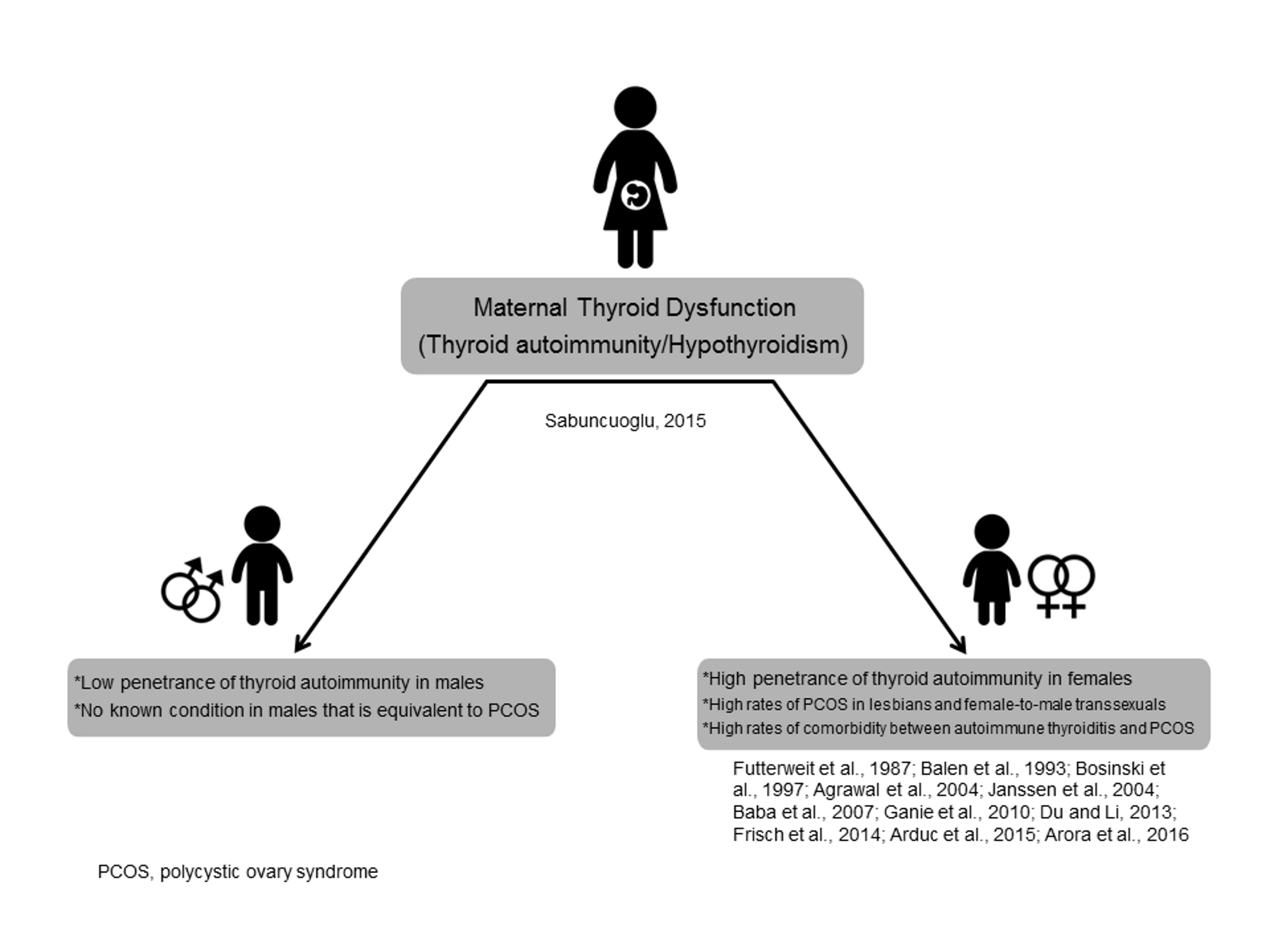

Prenatal thyroid theory of same-sex attraction/gender dysphoria has been based on clinical and developmental observations of children presenting to child psychiatry clinics in Istanbul/Turkey. The report of 12 cases with same-sex attraction/gender dysphoria born to mothers with thyroid diseases was first presented in EPA Congress, Vienna (2015) and published as an article in the same year. The extremely significant relationship between the two conditions suggested an independent model, named the Prenatal Thyroid Model of Homosexuality. According to Turkish child & adolescent psychiatrist Osman Sabuncuoglu, who generated the theory, maternal thyroid dysfunction may lead to abnormal deviations from gender-specific development in the offspring. Autoimmune destructive process as seen in Hashimoto's thyroiditis, diminished supply of thyroid hormones, and impacts on prenatal androgen system were all considered as contributing mechanisms. In a follow-up theoretical paper, previous research findings indicating higher rates of polyendocrine metabolic ovarian syndrome (PMOS) in female-to-male transsexuals and lesbian women were conceived as an indication of Prenatal Thyroid Model since PMOS and autoimmune thyroiditis are frequently comorbid diseases. Likewise, increased rates of autism spectrum disorder (ASD) in children born to mothers with thyroid dysfunction and overrepresentation of ASD individuals in gender dysphoria populations suggest such an association. A second group of young children with this pattern were presented in IACAPAP Congress, Prague (2018). Furthermore, 9 additional cases were reported in the IACAPAP Congress (2024).

The findings from previous research in LGBT populations had called for attention to be paid to the thyroid system. A commentary by Jeffrey Mullen, published shortly after the 2015 article, underlined the importance of Prenatal Thyroid Model and supported developments in this field. Afterwards, several authors have emphasized the role of thyroid system in sexuality while citing the Prenatal Thyroid Model. Among them, Carosa et al. concluded that thyroid hormones, affecting the human sexual function strongly, the thyroid gland must be considered, along with the genitals and the brain, a sexual organ. As a tertiary source, an authoritative book on the subject of interplay between endocrinology, brain and behavior has also cited the thyroid-homosexuality proposal article in the latest edition.

=== Genetic influences ===
Multiple genes have been found to play a role in sexual orientation. Scientists caution that many people misconstrue the meanings of genetic and environmental. Environmental influence does not automatically imply that the social environment influences or contributes to the development of sexual orientation. Hypotheses for the impact of the post-natal social environment on sexual orientation are weak, especially for males. There is a vast non-social environment, particularly prenatal development, which remains poorly understood.

==== Twin studies ====
Twin studies are one method of testing genetic and environmental influences, although they cannot reveal what kind of environmental influence this may include (social or non-social). Identical or monozygotic twins share their genes, while fraternal or dizygotic twins are only as genetically similar as any other sibling pair. When twins both share a trait, they are concordant for this trait; and when they differ they are discordant. If identical twins have a higher rate of concordance for a trait than fraternal twins, it indicates that genes may contribute to the trait.

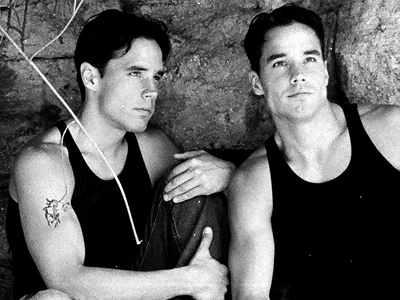
Identical twin studies are a useful mechanism for assessing the role of genes and environment.

The 2016 Bailey et al. meta-analysis of all twin studies on sexual orientation found that the median concordance for homosexual or non-heterosexual orientation in twins in unbiased probability samples is 24% for monozygotic identical twins, and 15% for dizygotic twins. According to Rice et al. the identical twin concordance for homosexuality is similar to identical twin concordance for two other traits influenced by prenatal androgens: cryptorchidism and hypospadias (feminized male gonads) which have an identical twin concordance around 25%, despite twins sharing genes and prenatal environments. Twin studies have found that the shared environment (or familial environment) has little or no influence on sexual orientation.

Twin studies have also found that among twins with differing sexual orientations, homosexual twins were significantly more gender nonconforming than their heterosexual co-twin, and that this was noticeable from a young age. Bailey states:

What kind of environmental factor can cause genetically identical twins reared in the same family from birth—often dressed alike and given the same toys—to differ in their sexual orientations? It is a fascinating question that we haven't begun to answer well. One hint comes from the childhood behavior findings. When identical twins differed in their sexual orientation, the gay one tended to recall being much more feminine than the straight one. This means that the environmental factors that cause the twin differences are there early on, by childhood. Based on other things we know, such as studies of children with cloacal exstrophy, I suspect that these factors operate in the womb.

Identical twins reared apart from birth are another method of studying the origin of psychological traits, although such twin pairs are rare. Three sets of male twin pairs exist in the literature. In the first pair found by Thomas Bouchard, both male twins reared apart from birth were homosexual. In a second pair found by Whitham, both males were also homosexual. In the third pair found by Bouchard, the male twins were neither definitively concordant nor discordant, as both had relations with males and females, thus this pair may be concordant for bisexuality. Among the female twin pairs; four female twin pairs were all discordant, although the small number of cases prevent any strong conclusions.

According to William Rice and colleagues, the concordance of homosexuality among twins raises the possibility that homosexuality is not caused by genes nor atypical levels of hormones, but an epigenetic mechanism controlling how sensitive fetuses are to prenatal hormones.

==== Chromosome linkage studies ====
List of chromosomal locations associated with sexual orientation
| Chromosome | Location | Associated genes | Sex | Study^{1} | Origin | Note |
|---|---|---|---|---|---|---|
| X chromosome | Xq28 | Speculative: MAGEA11; MECP2; IRAK1 | male only | Hamer et al. 1993 Sanders et al. 2015 | genetic | |
| Chromosome 1 | 1p36 | Rh system: RHCE; RHAG; RHBG; RHCG; RHD | both sexes | Ellis et al. 2008 | genetic | potential genetic linkage^{2} |
| Chromosome 4 | 4p14 | | female only | Ganna et al. 2019 | genetic | |
| Chromosome 7 | 7q31 | | both sexes | Ganna et al. 2019 | genetic | |
| Chromosome 8 | 8p12 | NKAIN3 | male only | Mustanski et al. 2005 Sanders et al. 2015 Sanders et al. 2017 | genetic | |
| Chromosome 9 | 9q34 | ABO | both sexes | Ellis et al. 2008 | genetic | potential genetic linkage^{2} |
| Chromosome 11 | 11q12 | OR51A7 (speculative) | male only | Ganna et al. 2019 | genetic | Olfactory system in mating preferences |
| Chromosome 12 | 12q21 | | both sexes | Ganna et al. 2019 | genetic | |
| Chromosome 13 | 13q31 | SLITRK6 | male only | Sanders et al. 2017 | genetic | Diencephalon-associated gene |
| Chromosome 14 | 14q31 | TSHR | male only | Sanders et al. 2017 | genetic | |
| Chromosome 15 | 15q21 | TCF12 | male only | Ganna et al. 2019 | genetic | |
^{1}Reported primary studies are not conclusive evidence of any relationship.^{2}Not believed to be causal.

Chromosome linkage studies of sexual orientation have indicated the presence of multiple contributing genetic factors throughout the genome. In 1993, Dean Hamer and colleagues published findings from a linkage analysis of a sample of 76 gay brothers and their families. Hamer et al. found that the gay men had more gay male uncles and cousins on the maternal side of the family than on the paternal side. Gay brothers who showed this maternal pedigree were then tested for X chromosome linkage, using twenty-two markers on the X chromosome to test for similar alleles. In another finding, thirty-three of the forty sibling pairs tested were found to have similar alleles in the distal region of Xq28, which was significantly higher than the expected rates of 50% for fraternal brothers. This was popularly dubbed the "gay gene" in the media, causing significant controversy. In 1998, Sanders et al. reported on their similar study, in which they found that 13% of uncles of gay brothers on the maternal side were homosexual, compared with 6% on the paternal side.

A later analysis by Hu et al. replicated and refined the earlier findings. This study revealed that 67% of gay brothers in a new saturated sample shared a marker on the X chromosome at Xq28. Two other studies (Bailey et al., 1999; McKnight and Malcolm, 2000) failed to find a preponderance of gay relatives in the maternal line of homosexual men. One study by Rice et al. in 1999 failed to replicate the Xq28 linkage results. Meta-analysis of all available linkage data indicates a significant link to Xq28, but also indicates that additional genes must be present to account for the full heritability of sexual orientation.

Bocklandt et al. (2006) found extreme skewing of X-inactivation in mothers of two or more gay men. Typically, women's cells randomly inactivate one or both X chromosomes, while mothers of multiple gay men inactivate the same X chromosome in every cell. While this finding remains unexplained, it points indirectly to a role for the X chromosome in male sexual orientation.

Mustanski et al. (2005) performed a full-genome scan (instead of just an X chromosome scan) on individuals and families previously reported on in Hamer et al. (1993) and Hu et al. (1995), as well as additional new subjects. In the full sample they did not find linkage to Xq28.

Results from the first large, comprehensive multi-center genetic linkage study of male sexual orientation were reported by an independent group of researchers at the American Society of Human Genetics in 2012. The study population included 409 independent pairs of gay brothers, who were analyzed with over 300,000 single-nucleotide polymorphism markers. The data strongly replicated Hamer's Xq28 findings as determined by both two-point and multipoint (MERLIN) LOD score mapping. Significant linkage was also detected in the pericentromeric region of chromosome 8, overlapping with one of the regions detected in the Hamer lab's previous genome-wide study. The authors concluded that "our findings, taken in context with previous work, suggest that genetic variation in each of these regions contributes to development of the important psychological trait of male sexual orientation". Female sexual orientation does not seem to be linked to Xq28, though it does appear moderately heritable.

In addition to sex chromosomal contribution, a potential autosomal genetic contribution to the development of homosexual orientation has also been suggested. In a study population composed of more than 7000 participants, Ellis et al. (2008) found a statistically significant difference in the frequency of blood type A between homosexuals and heterosexuals. They also found that "unusually high" proportions of homosexual males and homosexual females were Rh negative in comparison to heterosexuals. As both blood type and Rh factor are genetically inherited traits controlled by alleles located on chromosome 9 and chromosome 1 respectively, the study indicates a potential link between genes on autosomes and homosexuality.

The biology of sexual orientation has been studied in detail in several animal model systems. In the common fruit fly Drosophila melanogaster, the complete pathway of sexual differentiation of the brain and the behaviors it controls is well established in both males and females, providing a concise model of biologically controlled courtship. In mammals, a group of geneticists at the Korea Advanced Institute of Science and Technology bred female mice specifically lacking a particular gene related to sexual behavior. Without the gene, the mice exhibited masculine sexual behavior and attraction toward urine of other female mice. Those mice who retained the gene fucose mutarotase (FucM) were attracted to male mice.

In interviews to the press, researchers have pointed that the evidence of genetic influences should not be equated with genetic determinism. According to Dean Hamer and Michael Bailey, genetic aspects are only one of the multiple causes of homosexuality.

In 2017, Scientific Reports published an article with a genome wide association study on male sexual orientation. The research consisted of 1,077 homosexual men and 1,231 heterosexual men. A gene named SLITRK6 on chromosome 13 was identified. The research supports another study which had been done by the neuroscientist Simon LeVay. LeVay's research suggested that the hypothalamus of gay men is different from straight men. The SLITRK6 is active in the mid-brain where the hypothalamus is. The researchers found that the thyroid stimulating hormone receptor (TSHR) on chromosome 14 shows sequence differences between gay and straight men. Graves' disease is associated with TSHR abnormalities, with previous research indicating that Graves' disease is more common in gay men than in straight men. Research indicated that gay people have lower body weight than straight people. It had been suggested that the overactive TSHR hormone lowered body weight in gay people, though this remains unproven.

In 2018, Ganna et al. performed another genome-wide association study on sexual orientation of men and women with data from 26,890 people who had at least one same-sex partner and 450,939 controls. The data in the study was meta-analyzed and obtained from the UK Biobank study and 23andMe. The researchers identified four variants more common in people who reported at least one same-sex experience on chromosomes 7, 11, 12, and 15. The variants on chromosomes 11 and 15 were specific to men, with the variant on chromosome 11 located in an olfactory gene and the variant on chromosome 15 having previously been linked to male-pattern baldness. The four variants were also correlated with mood and mental health disorders; major depressive disorder and schizophrenia in men and women, and bipolar disorder in women. However, none of the four variants could reliably predict sexual orientation.

In August 2019, a genome-wide association study of 493,001 individuals concluded that hundreds or thousands of genetic variants underlie homosexual behavior in both sexes, with 5 variants in particular being significantly associated. Some of these variants had sex-specific effects, and two of these variants suggested links to biological pathways that involve sex hormone regulation and olfaction. All the variants together captured between 8 and 25% of the variation in individual differences in homosexual behavior. These genes partly overlap with those for several other traits, including openness to experience and risk-taking behavior. Additional analyses suggested that sexual behavior, attraction, identity, and fantasies are influenced by a similar set of genetic variants. They also found that the genetic effects that differentiate heterosexual from homosexual behavior are not the same as those that differ among nonheterosexuals with lower versus higher proportions of same-sex partners, which suggests that there is no single continuum from heterosexual to homosexual preference, as suggested by the Kinsey scale.

In October 2021, another research paper reported that genetic factors influence the development of same-sex sexual behavior. A two-stage genome-wide association study (GWAS) with a total sample of 1478 homosexual males and 3313 heterosexual males in Han Chinese populations identified two genetic loci (FMR1NB and ZNF536) showing consistent association with male sexual orientation.

=== Epigenetics studies ===
A hypothesis developed by Rice et al. proposes that epigenetic "epi‐marks" (non–DNA sequence modifications like DNA methylation) play a central buffering role in sexual development, by controlling how strongly fetal androgen signaling influences tissues. Some of those epi‐marks are sex‐specific (i.e. different in XX vs. XY embryos) and help protect against atypical androgen exposure (too much in XX, too little in XY). Occasionally, some of these protective epi‐marks escape erasure across generations, and find themselves in an opposite‐sex individual, causing a gonad–trait discordance (a mismatch between gonadal sex and some sexually dimorphic traits). Rice et al. propose that such a discordance may be causing same‐sex sexual orientations.

=== Birth order ===
Blanchard and Klassen (1997) reported that each additional older brother increases the odds of a man being gay by 33%. This is now "one of the most reliable epidemiological variables ever identified in the study of sexual orientation". To explain this finding, it has been proposed that male fetuses provoke a maternal immune reaction that becomes stronger with each successive male fetus. This maternal immunization hypothesis (MIH) begins when cells from a male fetus enter the mother's circulation during pregnancy or while giving birth. Male fetuses produce H-Y antigens which are "almost certainly involved in the sexual differentiation of vertebrates". These Y-linked proteins would not be recognized in the mother's immune system because she is female, causing her to develop antibodies which would travel through the placental barrier into the fetal compartment. From here, the anti-male bodies would then cross the blood/brain barrier (BBB) of the developing fetal brain, altering sex-dimorphic brain structures relative to sexual orientation, increasing the likelihood that the exposed son will be more attracted to men than women. It is this antigen which maternal H-Y antibodies are proposed to both react to and 'remember'. Successive male fetuses are then attacked by H-Y antibodies which somehow decrease the ability of H-Y antigens to perform their usual function in brain masculinization.

In 2017, researchers discovered a biological mechanism of gay people who tend to have older brothers. They believed the Neuroligin 4 Y-linked protein was responsible for a later son being gay. They found that women had significantly higher anti-NLGN4Y levels than men. In addition, mothers of gay sons, particularly those with older brothers, had significantly higher anti-NLGN4Y levels than did the control samples of women, including mothers of heterosexual sons. The results suggest an association between a maternal immune response to NLGN4Y and subsequent sexual orientation in male offspring.

The fraternal birth order effect, however, does not apply to instances where a firstborn is homosexual.

=== Pheromone studies ===
Research conducted in Sweden has suggested that gay and straight men respond differently to two odors that are believed to be involved in sexual arousal. The research showed that when both heterosexual women and gay men are exposed to a testosterone derivative found in men's sweat, a region in the hypothalamus is activated. Heterosexual men, on the other hand, have a similar response to an estrogen-like compound found in women's urine. The conclusion is that sexual attraction, whether same-sex or opposite-sex oriented, operates similarly on a biological level. Researchers have suggested that this possibility could be further explored by studying young subjects to see if similar responses in the hypothalamus are found and then correlating these data with adult sexual orientation.

=== Studies of brain structure ===
A number of sections of the brain have been reported to be sexually dimorphic; that is, they vary between men and women. There have also been reports of variations in brain structure corresponding to sexual orientation. In 1990, Dick Swaab and Michel A. Hofman reported a difference in the size of the suprachiasmatic nucleus between homosexual and heterosexual men. In 1992, Allen and Gorski reported a difference related to sexual orientation in the size of the anterior commissure, but this research was refuted by numerous studies, one of which found that the entirety of the variation was caused by a single outlier.

Research on the physiologic differences between male and female brains are based on the idea that people have a male or a female brain, and this mirrors the behavioral differences between the two sexes. Some researchers state that solid scientific support for this is lacking. Although consistent differences have been identified, including the size of the brain and of specific brain regions, male and female brains are very similar.

==== Sexually dimorphic nuclei in the anterior hypothalamus ====
LeVay also conducted some of these early researches. He studied four groups of neurons in the hypothalamus called INAH1, INAH2, INAH3 and INAH4. This was a relevant area of the brain to study, because of evidence that it played a role in the regulation of sexual behaviour in animals, and because INAH2 and INAH3 had previously been reported to differ in size between men and women.

He obtained brains from 41 deceased hospital patients. The subjects were classified into three groups. The first group comprised 19 gay men who had died of AIDS-related illnesses. The second group comprised 16 men whose sexual orientation was unknown, but whom the researchers presumed to be heterosexual. Six of these men had died of AIDS-related illnesses. The third group was of six women whom the researchers presumed to be heterosexual. One of the women had died of an AIDS-related illness.

The HIV-positive people in the presumably heterosexual patient groups were all identified from medical records as either intravenous drug abusers or recipients of blood transfusions. Two of the men who identified as heterosexual specifically denied ever engaging in a homosexual sex act. The records of the remaining heterosexual subjects contained no information about their sexual orientation; they were assumed to have been primarily or exclusively heterosexual "on the basis of the numerical preponderance of heterosexual men in the population".

LeVay found no evidence for a difference between the groups in the size of INAH1, INAH2 or INAH4. However, the INAH3 group appeared to be twice as big in the heterosexual male group as in the gay male group; the difference was highly significant, and remained significant when only the six AIDS patients were included in the heterosexual group. The size of INAH3 in the homosexual men's brains was comparable to the size of INAH3 in the heterosexual women's brains.

William Byne and colleagues attempted to identify the size differences reported in INAH 1–4 by replicating the experiment using brain samples from other subjects: 14 HIV-positive homosexual males, 34 presumed heterosexual males (10 HIV-positive), and 34 presumed heterosexual females (9 HIV-positive). The researchers found a significant difference in INAH3 size between heterosexual men and heterosexual women. The INAH3 size of the homosexual men was apparently smaller than that of the heterosexual men, and larger than that of the heterosexual women, though neither difference quite reached statistical significance.

Byne and colleagues also weighed and counted numbers of neurons in INAH3 tests not carried out by LeVay. The results for INAH3 weight were similar to those for INAH3 size; that is, the INAH3 weight for the heterosexual male brains was significantly larger than for the heterosexual female brains, while the results for the gay male group were between those of the other two groups but not quite significantly different from either. The neuron count also found a male-female difference in INAH3, but found no trend related to sexual orientation.

LeVay has said that Byne replicated his work, but that he employed a two-tailed statistical analysis, which is typically reserved for when no previous findings had employed the difference. LeVay has said that "given that my study had already reported a INAH3 to be smaller in gay men, a one tailed approach would have been more appropriate, and it would have yielded a significant difference [between heterosexual and homosexual men]".

J. Michael Bailey has criticized LeVay's critics—describing the claim that the INAH-3 difference could be attributable to AIDS as "aggravating", since the "INAH-3 did not differ between the brains of straight men who died of AIDS and those who did not have the disease". Bailey has further criticized the second objection that was raised, that being gay might have somehow caused the difference in INAH-3, and not vice-versa, saying "the problem with this idea is that the hypothalamus appears to develop early. Not a single expert I have ever asked about LeVay's study thought it was plausible that sexual behavior caused the INAH-3 differences."

Neuroscientist Marc Breedlove also countered Simon LeVay, arguing that "We cannot know whether gay men were born with a small INAH3 that led them to develop a gay orientation, or whether some other process caused them to develop a gay orientation and, in doing so, resulted in a lower INAH3 than in heterosexual men," and that "Gay men are widely perceived as 'less masculinized', but the data indicate that they are exposed to as much prenatal androgen as heterosexual men".

The SCN of homosexual males has been demonstrated to be larger (both the volume and the number of neurons are twice as many as in heterosexual males). These areas of the hypothalamus have not yet been explored in homosexual females nor bisexual males nor females. Although the functional implications of such findings still have not been examined in detail, they cast serious doubt over the widely accepted Dörner hypothesis that homosexual males have a "female hypothalamus" and that the key mechanism of differentiating the "male brain from originally female brain" is the epigenetic influence of testosterone during prenatal development.

A 2010 study by Garcia-Falgueras and Swaab stated that "the fetal brain develops during the intrauterine period in the male direction through a direct action of testosterone on the developing nerve cells, or in the female direction through the absence of this hormone surge. In this way, our gender identity (the conviction of belonging to the male or female gender) and sexual orientation are programmed or organized into our brain structures when we are still in the womb. There is no indication that social environment after birth has an effect on gender identity or sexual orientation."

==== Ovine model ====
The domestic ram is used as an experimental model to study early programming of the neural mechanisms which underlie homosexuality, developing from the observation that approximately 8% of domestic rams are sexually attracted to other rams (male-oriented) when compared to the majority of rams which are female-oriented. In many species, a prominent feature of sexual differentiation is the presence of a sexually dimorphic nucleus (SDN) in the preoptic hypothalamus, which is larger in males than in females.

Roselli et al. discovered an ovine SDN (oSDN) in the preoptic hypothalamus that is smaller in male-oriented rams than in female-oriented rams, but similar in size to the oSDN of females. Neurons of the oSDN show aromatase expression which is also smaller in male-oriented rams versus female-oriented rams, suggesting that sexual orientation is neurologically hard-wired and may be influenced by hormones. However, results failed to associate the role of neural aromatase in the sexual differentiation of brain and behavior in the sheep, due to the lack of defeminization of adult sexual partner preference or oSDN volume as a result of aromatase activity in the brain of the fetuses during the critical period. Having said this, it is more likely that oSDN morphology and homosexuality may be programmed through an androgen receptor that does not involve aromatisation. Most of the data suggests that homosexual rams, like female-oriented rams, are masculinized and defeminized with respect to mounting, receptivity, and gonadotrophin secretion, but are not defeminized for sexual partner preferences, also suggesting that such behaviors may be programmed differently. Although the exact function of the oSDN is not fully known, its volume, length, and cell number seem to correlate with sexual orientation, and a dimorphism in its volume and of cells could bias the processing cues involved in partner selection. More research is needed in order to understand the requirements and timing of the development of the oSDN and how prenatal programming effects the expression of mate choice in adulthood.

=== Childhood gender nonconformity ===
Childhood gender nonconformity is a strong predictor of adult sexual orientation that has been consistently replicated in research, and is thought to be strong evidence of a biological difference between heterosexual and non-heterosexuals. A review authored by J. Michael Bailey states: "childhood gender nonconformity comprises the following phenomena among boys: cross-dressing, desiring to have long hair, playing with dolls, disliking competitive sports and rough play, preferring girls as playmates, exhibiting elevated separation anxiety, and desiring to be—or believing that one is—a girl. In girls, gender nonconformity comprises dressing like and playing with boys, showing interest in competitive sports and rough play, lacking interest in conventionally female toys such as dolls and makeup, and desiring to be a boy". This gender nonconformist behavior typically emerges at preschool age, although is often evident as early as age 2. Children are only considered gender nonconforming if they persistently engage in a variety of these behaviors, as opposed to engaging in a behavior on a few times or on occasion. It is also not a one-dimensional trait, but rather has varying degrees.

Children who grow up to be non-heterosexual were, on average, substantially more gender nonconforming in childhood. This is confirmed in both retrospective studies where homosexuals, bisexuals and heterosexuals are asked about their gender typical behavior in childhood, and in prospective studies, where highly gender nonconforming children are followed from childhood into adulthood to find out their sexual orientation. A review of retrospective studies that measured gender nonconforming traits estimated that 89% of homosexual men exceeded heterosexual males level of gender nonconformity, whereas just 2% of heterosexual men exceeded the homosexual median. For female sexual orientation, the figures were 81% and 12% respectively. A variety of other assessments such as childhood home videos, photos and reports of parents also confirm this finding. Critics of this research see this as confirming stereotypes; however, no study has ever demonstrated that this research has exaggerated childhood gender nonconformity. J. Michael Bailey argues that gay men often deny that they were gender nonconforming in childhood because they may have been bullied or maltreated by peers and parents for it, and because they often do not find femininity attractive in other gay males and thus would not want to acknowledge it in themselves. Additional research in Western cultures and non-Western cultures including Latin America, Asia, Polynesia, and the Middle East supports the validity of childhood gender nonconformity as a predictor of adult non-heterosexuality.

This research does not mean that all non-heterosexuals were gender nonconforming, but rather indicates that long before sexual attraction is known, non-heterosexuals, on average, are noticeably different from other children. There is little evidence that gender nonconforming children have been encouraged or taught to behave that way; rather, childhood gender nonconformity typically emerges despite conventional socialization. Medical experiments in which infant boys were sex reassigned and reared as girls did not make them feminine nor attracted to males.

=== Boys who were surgically reassigned female ===
Between the 1960s and 2000, many newborn and infant boys were surgically reassigned as females if they were born with malformed penises, or if they lost their penises in accidents. Many surgeons believed such males would be happier being socially and surgically reassigned female. In all seven published cases that have provided sexual orientation information, the subjects grew up to be attracted to females. Six cases were exclusively attracted to females, with one case 'predominantly' attracted to females. In a review article in the journal Psychological Science in the Public Interest, six researchers including J. Michael Bailey state this establishes a strong case that male sexual orientation is partly established before birth:

This is the result we would expect if male sexual orientation were entirely due to nature, and it is opposite of the result expected if it were due to nurture, in which case we would expect that none of these individuals would be predominantly attracted to women. They show how difficult it is to derail the development of male sexual orientation by psychosocial means.

They further argue that this raises questions about the significance of the social environment on sexual orientation, stating, "If one cannot reliably make a male human become attracted to other males by cutting off his penis in infancy and rearing him as a girl, then what other psychosocial intervention could plausibly have that effect?" It is further stated that neither cloacal exstrophy (resulting in a malformed penis), nor surgical accidents, are associated with abnormalities of prenatal androgens, thus, the brains of these individuals were male-organized at birth. Six of the seven identified as heterosexual males at follow up, despite being surgically altered and reared as females, with researchers adding: "available evidence indicates that in such instances, parents are deeply committed to raising these children as girls and in as gender-typical a manner as possible." Bailey et al. describe these sex reassignments as 'the near-perfect quasi-experiment' in measuring the impact of 'nature' versus 'nurture' with regards to male homosexuality.

== Homosexuality and evolution ==
=== General ===
Sexual practices that significantly reduce the frequency of heterosexual intercourse also significantly decrease the chances of successful reproduction, and for this reason, they would appear to be maladaptive in an evolutionary context following a simple Darwinian model (competition amongst individuals) of natural selection—on the assumption that homosexuality would reduce this frequency. Several theories have been advanced to explain this contradiction, and new experimental evidence has demonstrated their feasibility.

=== Kin selection ===
The "gay uncle hypothesis" posits that people who themselves do not have children may nonetheless increase the prevalence of their family's genes in future generations by providing resources (e.g., food, supervision, defense, shelter) to the offspring of their closest relatives.

This hypothesis is an extension of the theory of kin selection, which was originally developed to explain apparent altruistic acts which seemed to be maladaptive. The initial concept was suggested by J. B. S. Haldane in 1932 and later elaborated by many others including John Maynard Smith, W. D. Hamilton, Mary Jane West-Eberhard, and E. O. Wilson. This concept was also used to explain the patterns of certain social insects where most of the members are non-reproductive. Conversely, social psychologist David Buss has argued that there is no empirical evidence that supports the hypothesis.

In 2001, Evolution and Human Behavior published a questionnaire survey of 57 heterosexual and 66 homosexual male subjects in the United States that found that homosexual subjects were no more likely to provide financial resources towards family members, heterosexual subjects were more likely to give more financial resources to siblings than homosexual subjects, and homosexual subjects tended to be more estranged from family members. In 2005, Archives of Sexual Behavior published a replication study with 60 heterosexual and 60 homosexual male subjects in England that likewise found no significant differences between heterosexual and homosexual subjects in familial affinity or generosity towards family members. Vasey, Pocock, and VanderLaan (2007) and Vasey and VanderLaan (2010) tested the theory on the Pacific island of Samoa, where they studied women, straight men, and the fa'afafine, men who prefer other men as sexual partners and are accepted within the culture as a distinct third gender category. Vasey and VanderLaan found that the fa'afafine said they were significantly more willing to help kin, yet much less interested in helping children who are not family, providing the first evidence to support the kin selection hypothesis. The hypothesis is consistent with other studies on homosexuality, which show that it is more prevalent amongst both siblings and twins.

Anthropologist Raymond Hames notes that Vasey and VanderLaan's research on the fa'afafine identifies them as "transgendered androphilic males" as opposed to "sex-gender congruent androphiles" or "egalitarian homosexuals" in Western societies. Based on research conducted in Japan that found no evidence that homosexual Japanese men exhibited elevated avuncular tendencies compared to heterosexual counterparts, Vasey and VanderLaan (2011) provides evidence that if an adaptively designed avuncular male androphilic phenotype exists and its development is contingent on a particular social environment, then a collectivistic cultural context is insufficient, in and of itself, for the expression of such a phenotype. In 2011 and 2014, the Journal of Cognition and Culture published two studies that found that Canadian homosexual men exhibited significantly greater altruistic tendencies toward kin versus non-kin children relative to heterosexual men and women, but did not find that Canadian homosexual males exhibited significantly higher altruistic behavior towards nieces and nephews over geographic disconnect.

In 2016, the Journal of Sex Research published a study comprising 278 homosexual (or kathoey) and heterosexual male subjects in Italy and Spain and from the Urak Lawoi of Thailand that found no greater kin altruism or avuncularity among homosexual subjects in any of the three cultures and that kin altruism and avuncularity was associated with societal differences in cultural norms about general altruism toward non-kin children. In 2017, Evolutionary Psychological Science published a logistic regression analysis of the results of 17,295 female subjects across 58 countries on World Values Survey questionnaires about attitudes toward homosexuality that found that subjects that were potentially most in need of alloparental support exhibited significantly more positive attitudes towards homosexuals, which the researchers suggested was circumstantial evidence in support of the hypothesis on a global scale. In 2018, Archives of Sexual Behavior published a study comparing avuncular tendencies between heterosexual and homosexual men on Java in Indonesia that found that homosexual men reported an increased willingness to transfer resources and money toward nephews and nieces but only reduced the direct reproductive cost to homosexual men by 20%, with the researchers concluding that kin selection alone was an insufficient explanation of male homosexuality.

=== Antagonistic pleiotropy ===
Ferren MacIntyre and Kenneth W. Estep have suggested that homosexuality is indirectly adaptive, by conferring a reproductive advantage on heterosexual siblings or their children. By way of analogy, the allele (a particular version of a gene) which causes sickle cell disease when two copies are present, also confers an adaptive advantage when one copy is present by providing resistance to malaria with non-symptomatic sickle cell trait—which is known as "heterozygote advantage".

Brendan Zietsch of the Queensland Institute of Medical Research proposes the alternative theory that men exhibiting female traits become more attractive to females and are thus more likely to mate, provided the genes involved do not drive them to complete rejection of heterosexuality.

In a 2008 study, its authors stated that "There is considerable evidence that human sexual orientation is genetically influenced, so it is not known how homosexuality, which tends to lower reproductive success, is maintained in the population at a relatively high frequency." They hypothesized that "while genes predisposing to homosexuality reduce homosexuals' reproductive success, they may confer some advantage in heterosexuals who carry them". Their results suggested that "genes predisposing to homosexuality may confer a mating advantage in heterosexuals, which could help explain the evolution and maintenance of homosexuality in the population". However, in the same study, the authors noted that "nongenetic alternative explanations cannot be ruled out" as a reason for the heterosexual in the homosexual-heterosexual twin pair having more partners, specifically citing "social pressure on the other twin to act in a more heterosexual way" (and thus seek out a greater number of sexual partners) as an example of one alternative explanation. The study acknowledges that a large number of sexual partners may not lead to greater reproductive success, specifically noting there is an "absence of evidence relating the number of sexual partners and actual reproductive success, either in the present or in our evolutionary past".

The heterosexual advantage hypothesis was given strong support by the 2004 Italian study demonstrating increased fecundity in the female matrilineal relatives of gay men. As originally pointed out by Dean Hamer, even a modest increase in reproductive capacity in females carrying a "gay gene" could easily account for its maintenance at high levels in the population.

In 2004, Italian researchers conducted a study of about 4,600 people who were the relatives of 98 homosexual and 100 heterosexual men. Female relatives of the homosexual men tended to have more offspring than those of the heterosexual men. Female relatives of the homosexual men on their mother's side tended to have more offspring than those on the father's side. The researchers concluded that there was genetic material being passed down on the X chromosome which both promote fertility in the mother and homosexuality in her male offspring. The connections discovered would explain about 20% of the cases studied, indicating that it being a highly significant factor to account for, but not the sole genetic factor determining sexual orientation. A 2008 follow-up study using a comparative survey design found that 147 white and non-white homosexual men had a significantly more relatives in their maternal lines than 155 heterosexual men but not in the paternal line, and while the maternal aunts of white homosexual men had significantly elevated fecundity as compared to white heterosexual men, every class of relative for non-white heterosexual men showed elevated fecundities as compared to non-white homosexual men.

Noting subsequent research by the original researchers that found that female relatives in the maternal line of homosexual men have higher fertility, anthropologist Ruth Mace suggests that homosexuality is maintained by antagonistic pleiotropy and cites a cross-cultural study spanning 48 societies that found that male homosexuality was more prevalent in stratified societies, did not appear to be a cultural universal, and is possibly maintained by hypergyny. While the original cross-cultural study's empirical findings, conceptual basis, and methodology has been disputed by other researchers, a subsequent cross-cultural study of 107 societies across 6 continents replicated the previous study's findings.

In 2005, Archives of Sexual Behavior published a study comparing family size and fecundity among family relatives between 301 homosexual men and 404 heterosexual men and found that the mean family size for homosexual men was significantly larger than heterosexual men as well as increased fecundity among the relatives of homosexual men. In 2007, the Proceedings of the Royal Society: Series B published a study comparing the number of siblings of a sample of Samoan heterosexual males to fa'afafine counterparts that found that the fa'afafine tend to have more siblings, and specifically, a greater number of older brothers, older sisters, and younger brothers, and Archives of Sexual Behavior published a replication study in 2011 that found that likewise showed that the fa'afafine had a greater number of siblings than heterosexual males, which the researchers suggested indicates that a maternal fecundity effect exists in Samoa. In 2009, Archives of Sexual Behavior published a study that examined the probands of 152 homosexual men and 98 heterosexual men that found a significant fecundity increase in mothers (including primiparous mothers) but no evidence of increased paternal fecundity, which the researchers concluded suggested the existence of a sexually antagonistic inheritance partly linked to the X-chromosome promoting fecundity in females and homosexual sexual orientation in males.

In 2009, the Journal of Sexual Medicine published a study of 151 homosexual or bisexual men and 88 exclusively heterosexual men that found that significantly higher fecundity of female relatives of the maternal line (including mothers, maternal grandparents, and maternal aunts) for both bisexuals and homosexuals compared to the corresponding relatives of heterosexual subjects, which the researchers argued provided evidence for an association between X-chromosomal genetic factors with bisexuality in men and fecundity promotion in female carriers. In 2010, Archives of Sexual Behavior published a study comparing the pedigree sizes of 694 homosexual men and 894 heterosexual men sampled at pride parades that found that homosexual men had more relatives, especially paternal relatives, but no evidence that male sexual orientation is transmitted predominantly through the maternal line—which the researchers noted was contrary to previous research. In 2012, Archives of Sexual Behavior published a study that compared the probands of 4,784 firstborn homosexual men and 40,197 first-born heterosexual men across 6 datasets that found that the homosexual probands had significantly fewer siblings or a statistically insignificant difference in the number of siblings—which the researcher concluded was a direct contradiction of an antagonistic pleiotropy explanation of homosexuality, but also that such an explanation could not be tested solely by comparing the number of siblings of heterosexual and homosexual subjects because of the confounding impact of the fraternal birth order effect.

In 2012, PLOS One published a study that compared the fecundity of the paternal and maternal line grandmothers, aunts, and uncles of 86 Samoan heterosexual males and 86 fa'afafine that found elevated fecundity in the paternal and maternal line grandmothers of fa'afafine but not their aunts or uncles. In 2012, the Journal of Sexual Medicine published a study examining the phenotypic expression of the genetic factors that influence increased fecundity in female relative carriers that found that as compared with corresponding female relatives of heterosexual men, mothers and maternal aunts of homosexual men had fewer gynecological disorders and complicated pregnancies, had reduced family stability and a higher divorce and spousal separation rate, and self-reported less interest in having children, less emphasis on romantic love within couples, and less importance on their social life, but scored higher on the extraversion scale of a Big Five personality traits questionnaire.

In 2017, Archives of Sexual Behavior published a study investigating differences in fertility rates of the paternal and maternal biological relatives of 191 fa'afafine and 191 homosexual Samoan male subjects that found that the mothers and maternal grandmothers of fa'afafine showed elevated fertility as compared with homosexual men but not for paternal grandmothers or aunts, which led the researchers to conclude that their findings in Samoa for an antagonistic pleiotropy explanation of homosexuality provided only equivocal support. In 2018, Human Nature published a study investigating the fecundity among 30,203 relatives of 650 homosexual or bisexual women as compared with 808 heterosexual women that found that the direct fitness of homosexual females was four times lower than that of heterosexual females, but that the pedigree size and relative average fecundity in both the paternal and maternal sides of the families of the homosexual women were significantly higher than the families of the heterosexual women—which the researchers suggested appeared to offset the loss in fitness.

In 2020, Archives of Sexual Behavior published a study that investigated fecundity among the relatives of 115 transgender men and 112 homosexual men in the Isthmus Zapotec culture of Mexico (whom the Isthmus Zapotec refer to as muxe gunaa and the muxe nguiiu respectively) as compared with 171 heterosexual men and found that the mothers and paternal aunts of the transgender men had higher fecundity than those of homosexual and heterosexual men, but found no such differences between the families of the heterosexual men and the homosexual men. In 2020, the Proceedings of the Royal Society: Series B published a meta-analysis of 10 studies comprising 5,390 homosexual and heterosexual subjects across 14 samples that found evidence for a fraternal birth order effect but no evidence for a female fecundity effect (i.e. an association between higher maternal fertility and homosexual orientation among male offspring) using a mathematical model proposed by mathematician Tanya Khovanova, but the reviewers noted that Khovanova's methodology restricted samples to one-son and two-son families which resulted in lost data and possibly biased results, and also made the assumption that female offspring could be ignored for simplicity and clarity while the female fecundity effect is specified in terms of total offspring rather than male offspring exclusively.

In 2022, the Journal of Sex Research published a study of 26,542 men and 33,534 women that had entered same-sex unions in the Netherlands as compared with 4,607,785 men and 4,405,635 women that found robust evidence of a fraternal birth order effect on both male and female homosexuality and no support for a female fecundity effect, but the researchers qualified that their findings could be a result of sampling through a same-sex unions registry and only considered maternal siblings rather than other female relatives (e.g. sisters, maternal aunts, maternal grandmothers), and as such, that the existence of a female fecundity effect could not be discounted. In 2024, Archives of Sexual Behavior published a study comparing the fertility of the parents and grandparents of 459 homosexual men and 79 homosexual women to 7,312 heterosexual men and 3,352 heterosexual women in the Czech Republic that found higher fertility for only the paternal grandmothers of homosexual men and with a small effect size, leading the researchers to conclude that their findings did not support an antagonistic pleiotropy explanation of homosexuality.

In 2021, Nature Human Behaviour published a study that used the results from a pair of genome-wide association studies (GWAS) that found that opposite-sex behavior individuals that were carriers of genetic variants associated with same-sex behavior had a greater number of opposite-sex sexual partners on average, and that computer simulations suggested that such a mating advantage could explain the maintenance of such genetic variants in human populations. In 2024, Science Advances published a GWAS study that found that only the genetic variants associated with male bisexual behavior to be associated with greater offspring while the genetic variants associated with exclusive same-sex behavior were negatively associated with the number of offspring. In 2025, Trends in Genetics published a review analyzing the two studies that concluded that the evolutionary explanation of the persistence of genetic variants associated with same-sex behavior despite apparent fitness costs remained uncertain, but that antagonistic pleiotropy is a plausible persistence mechanism.

== Biological differences in gay men and lesbian women ==
Some studies have found correlations between physiology of people and their sexuality; these studies provide evidence which suggests that:

- Gay men and straight women have, on average, equally proportioned brain hemispheres. Lesbian women and straight men have, on average, slightly larger right brain hemispheres.
- The suprachiasmatic nucleus of the hypothalamus was found by Swaab and Hopffman to be larger in gay men than in non-gay men; the suprachiasmatic nucleus is also known to be larger in men than in women.
- Gay men report, on average, slightly longer and thicker penises than non-gay men.
- The average size of the INAH 3 in the brains of gay men is approximately the same size as INAH 3 in women, which is significantly smaller, and the cells more densely packed, than in heterosexual men's brains.
- The anterior commissure was found to be larger in gay men than women and heterosexual men, but a subsequent study found no such difference.
- The functioning of the inner ear and the central auditory system in lesbians and bisexual women are more like the functional properties found in men than in non-gay women (the researchers argued this finding was consistent with the prenatal hormonal theory of sexual orientation).
- The startle response (eyeblink following a loud sound) is similarly masculinized in lesbians and bisexual women.
- Gay and non-gay people's brains respond differently to two putative sex pheromones (AND, found in male armpit secretions, and EST, found in female urine).
- The amygdala, a region of the brain, is more active in gay men than non-gay men when exposed to sexually arousing material.
- Finger length ratios between the index and ring fingers have been reported to differ, on average, between non-gay and lesbian women.
- Gay men and lesbians are significantly more likely to be left-handed or ambidextrous than non-gay men and women; Simon LeVay argues that because "[h]and preference is observable before birth... [t]he observation of increased non-right-handness in gay people is therefore consistent with the idea that sexual orientation is influenced by prenatal processes," perhaps heredity.
- Gay men have increased ridge density in the fingerprints on their left thumbs and little fingers.
- Length of limbs and hands of gay men is smaller compared to height than the general population, but only among white men.

J. Michael Bailey has argued that the early childhood gender nonconforming behavior of homosexuals, as opposed to biological markers, are better evidence of homosexuality being an inborn trait. He argues that gay men are "punished much more than rewarded" for their childhood gender nonconformity, and that such behavior "emerges with no encouragement, and despite opposition", making it "the sine qua non of innateness".

== Political aspects ==
Whether genetic or other physiological or psychological determinants form the basis of sexual orientation is a highly politicized issue. The Advocate, a U.S. gay and lesbian newsmagazine, reported in 1996 that 61% of its readers believed that "it would mostly help gay and lesbian rights if homosexuality were found to be biologically determined". A cross-national study in the United States, the Philippines, and Sweden found that those who believed that "homosexuals are born that way" held significantly more positive attitudes toward homosexuality than those who believed that "homosexuals choose to be that way" or "learn to be that way".

The Equal Protection Clause of the 14th Amendment to the United States Constitution and the Due Process Clause of the 5th Amendment by reverse incorporation requires that when the federal or state governments create a classification for a group suspected of being discriminated against, eligibility for heightened scrutiny is based on several factors including immutability. Evidence that sexual orientation is biologically determined (and therefore perhaps immutable in the legal sense) would strengthen the legal case for heightened scrutiny of laws discriminating on that basis. In Obergefell v. Hodges (2015), the Supreme Court of the United States held that the Equal Protection Clause requires state governments to license same-sex marriages and recognize same-sex marriages performed by other state governments citing an amicus curiae brief that argued that sexual orientation is immutable which was jointly filed by the American Psychological Association, the American Psychiatric Association, the American Academy of Pediatrics, the American Association for Marriage and Family Therapy, the National Association of Social Workers, the American Psychoanalytic Association, the American Academy of Family Physicians, and the American Medical Association.

The perceived causes of sexual orientation have a significant bearing on the status of sexual minorities in the eyes of social conservatives. The Family Research Council, a conservative Christian think tank in Washington, D.C., argues in the book Getting It Straight that finding people are born gay "would advance the idea that sexual orientation is an innate characteristic, like race; that homosexuals, like African-Americans, should be legally protected against 'discrimination;' and that disapproval of homosexuality should be as socially stigmatized as racism. However, it is not true." On the other hand, some social conservatives such as Reverend Robert Schenck have argued that people can accept any scientific evidence while still morally opposing homosexuality. National Organization for Marriage board member and fiction writer Orson Scott Card has supported biological research on homosexuality, writing that "our scientific efforts in regard to homosexuality should be to identify genetic and uterine causes... so that the incidence of this dysfunction can be minimized.... [However, this should not be seen] as an attack on homosexuals, a desire to 'commit genocide' against the homosexual community... There is no 'cure' for homosexuality because it is not a disease. There are, however, different ways of living with homosexual desires."

Some advocates for the rights of sexual minorities resist what they perceive as attempts to pathologise or medicalise 'deviant' sexuality, and choose to fight for acceptance in a moral or social realm. The journalist Chandler Burr has stated that "[s]ome, recalling earlier psychiatric "treatments" for homosexuality, discern in the biological quest the seeds of genocide. They conjure up the specter of the surgical or chemical "rewiring" of gay people, or of abortions of fetal homosexuals who have been hunted down in the womb." LeVay has said in response to letters from gays and lesbians making such criticisms that the research "has contributed to the status of gay people in society".

== See also ==
- Causes of gender incongruence
- Demographics of sexual orientation
- Environment and sexual orientation
- Epigenetic theories of homosexuality
- Gay bomb
- Neuroscience and sexual orientation
- Norms of reaction
