= The Female Eunuch =

1970 book by Germaine Greer

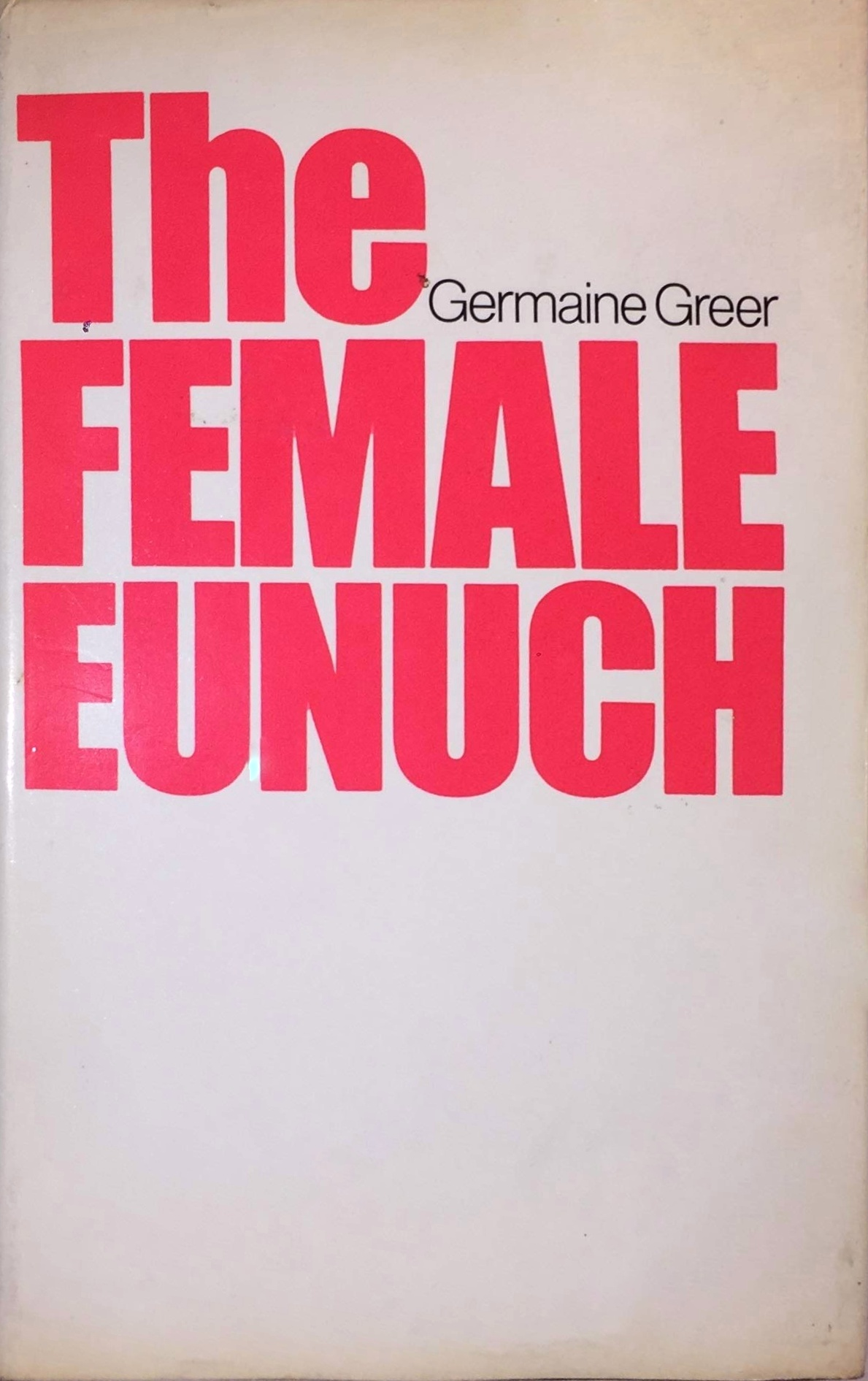
- Cover of the first edition
- Author: Germaine Greer
- Language: English
- Published: October 1970
- Publisher: MacGibbon & Kee
- Publication place: United Kingdom
- Media type: Print (hardcover and paperback)
- Pages: 354 (1st edition)
- ISBN: 0-374-52762-8
- OCLC: 46574483
- Dewey Decimal: 305.42 21
- LC Class: HQ1206 .G77 2001
- Followed by: The Whole Woman

The Female Eunuch is a 1970 book by Germaine Greer that became an international bestseller and an important text in the feminist movement. Greer's thesis is that the "traditional" suburban, consumerist, nuclear family represses women sexually, and that this devitalizes them, rendering them eunuchs. The book was published in London in October 1970. It received a mixed reception, but by March 1971, it had nearly sold out its second printing. It has been translated into eleven languages.

A sequel to The Female Eunuch, entitled The Whole Woman, was published in 1999.

== Summary ==
The book is a feminist analysis, written with a mixture of polemic and scholarly research. It was a key text of the feminist movement in the 1970s, broadly discussed and criticised by other feminists and the wider community, particularly through the author's high profile in the broadcast media. In sections titled "Body", "Soul", "Energy", "Love" and "Hate" Greer examines historical definitions of women's perception of self and uses a premise of imposed limitations to critique modern consumer societies, female "normality", and masculine shaping of stereotypes quoting, "The World has lost its soul, and I my sex." In contrast to earlier feminist works, Greer uses humour, boldness, and coarse language to present a direct and candid description of female sexuality, much of this subject having remained undiscussed in English-speaking societies. Greer's irreverence towards Sigmund Freud and psychoanalysis was inspired by Simone de Beauvoir's The Second Sex. The work bridged academia and the contemporary arts in presenting the targets of the final section of the book, Revolution; it is in accord, and often associated, with a creative and revolutionary movement of the period.

Greer argues that men hate women, though the latter do not realise this and are taught to hate themselves.

In her final title labelled Revolution, Greer argues that change had to come about via revolution, not evolution. Women should get to know and come to accept their own bodies, taste their own menstrual blood, and give up celibacy and monogamy. Yet they should not burn their bras. "Bras are a ludicrous invention", she wrote, "but if you make bralessness a rule, you're just subjecting yourself to yet another repression." Greer complains of the "genteel, middle-class ladies" who sit on women's rights committees and spend their time signing petitions to achieve equality. Greer expresses that to gain equality a woman must not be genteel but she should instead seek revolution. In a foreword added to the 21st anniversary edition, Greer references the loss of women's freedom with the "sudden death of communism" (1989) as catapult for women the world over for a sudden transition into consumer Western society wherein there is little to no protection for mothers and the disabled; here, there is no freedom to speak:

The freedom I pleaded for twenty years ago was freedom to be a person, with dignity, integrity, nobility, passion, pride that constitute personhood. Freedom to run, shout, talk loudly and sit with your knees apart. Freedom to know and love the earth and all that swims, lies, and crawls upon it ... most of the women in the world are still afraid, still hungry, still mute and loaded by religion with all kinds of fetters, masked, muzzled, mutilated and beaten.

== Reception ==
In a 1971 interview, Greer said of her book that "The title is an indication of the problem. Women have somehow been separated from their libido, from their faculty of desire, from their sexuality. They've become suspicious about it. Like beasts, for example, who are castrated in farming in order to serve their master's ulterior motives—to be fattened or made docile—women have been cut off from their capacity for action. It's a process that sacrifices vigor for delicacy and succulence, and one that's got to be changed." In January 1972 The Age's reviewer Thelma Forshaw described The Female Eunuch as "the orchestrated over-the-back-fence grizzle ... based on the curious fancy ... we were all men, and then some fiend castrated half of us and gave us a ghastly internal bookie's bag called a womb". The newspaper declared that the review "has stirred up a considerable controversy". According to the journalist Keith Dunstan, "[t]he reviews of [the book] were extremely mixed. The most famous was by [Forshaw] of The Age". Dunstan contrasted this with a positive review by Sylvia Lawson of The Australian, "[it has] been greeted in Australia with some fantastically myopic, complacent and resentful printed comment ... [the book] is neither dogmatic nor complacent, neither strident nor paranoic ... [it is] ranging, exploratory and questioning".

Laura Miller of Salon described the book as a "fitful, passionate, scattered text, not cohesive enough to qualify as a manifesto. It's all over the place, impulsive, and fatally naive—which is to say it is the quintessential product of its time." The neuroscientist Simon LeVay wrote in Queer Science (1996) that subsequent scientific research contradicted Greer's claim that there are no differences between the brains of men and women. The critic Camille Paglia called The Female Eunuch a "marvelous book", and described Greer's international tour to promote it as "the zenith of twentieth-century feminism".
