= Ivanka Savic =

Swedish neuroscientist and physician

- Born: December 27, 1953 (age 72); Belgrade, Serbia
- Education: Karolinska Institute; Upsala University
- Scientific career
- Fields: Neurology, Neurophysiology
- Workplaces: Karolinska Institute; University of California, Los Angeles

Ivanka Savic Berglund (born 1953) is a Serbian-Swedish neuroscientist, a professor of neurology and chief physician at the Karolinska Institute in Sweden, and an adjunct professor in the neurology department at the University of California, Los Angeles (UCLA). Savic is best known for her neurophysiology and neuroimaging research relating to epilepsy, sex differences, sexual orientation, gender identity, brain processing of odors and pheromones, and the effects of chronic stress on the brain. Savic is a co-founder of the Stockholm Brain Institute and the editor of several medical books.

== Education and career ==
Savic was born in Belgrade, Serbia in 1953 to a family of high ranking military officers and academics. She began her medical studies at Uppsala University in Sweden, graduated as a doctor at Karolinska Institute (KI) in 1978 and became a certified doctor in 1980. In 1984 she became a specialist in neurology and in 1991 in clinical neurophysiology. Savic received her PhD doctorate in 1992. In 1994–1996, she worked in a post doctoral position with Jerome Engel at the University of California, Los Angeles (UCLA), which became a long standing collaboration.

In 1996, Savic returned to research at the Karolinska Institute, where she became an associate professor in 1999. The same year, she became chief physician at Karolinska University Hospital Huddinge. In 1997–2003, she had a research assistant and a research position at the Swedish Research Council. In 2003–2009, she held an "elite position" as a research group leader at the Karolinska Institute. She was appointed professor of neurology in 2013 with a special focus on gender differences at Karolinska Institute, combined with a position as chief physician at Karolinska University Hospital. In 2016 she became an adjunct professor at UCLA.

Savic is a co-founder and member of the Stockholm Brain Institute's executive committee. She is the editor and co-editor of two educational medical books on sex differences in the human brain, their underlying mechanisms and clinical implications.

== Scientific research ==
MRI scans of the human brain are a key technology in Savic's research.

=== Epilepsy ===
During her doctoral thesis, Savic investigated the GABA benzodiazepine receptor's role in temporal lobe epilepsy and helped to develop a new and internationally used method to pre-surgically diagnose the epileptogenic region.

=== Pheromone and odour processing ===
Savic was the first scientist to show that humans process pheromone stimuli in the brain, differently from other odours, and in a sexually differentiated manner.

=== Sexual orientation ===
Savic has carried out neuroimaging research to compare the brain structure of homosexual and heterosexual men and women. In 2008 Savic found both male and female homosexual persons in her samples had brain activation with pheromones, and amygdala's connections which resembled those of the opposite sex, i.e. gay men had a female-typical pattern, while lesbians had male-typical pattern. Neuroscientist Simon LeVay included her research in his book Gay, Straight, and the Reason Why, and discusses its relevance to other neuroscience research related to sexual orientation.

Savic and her colleagues also carried out research on brain activity in gay and straight men in response to "putative human pheromones".

Later research Savic carried out in 2018 and 2019 suggests that male homosexuality may be related to cerebral midline structures of the brain, which were not found in her sample of heterosexual females or males.

=== Gender identity ===
Savic has also studied the brains of transgender people. Her research suggests that transgender men and women have weaker connections between the two areas of the brain that process the perception of self and one's own body compared to cisgender persons. Savic has said these connections seem to improve after the person receives cross-hormone treatment. Savic has co-authored papers with the Dutch neuroscientist Dick Swaab on the brain structure of transsexual and transgender people.

== Publications ==
=== Books ===
- Savic, Ivanka, ed. (2020). Sex Differences in Neurology and Psychiatry. Vol. 175 (1st ed.). Elsevier. ISBN 978-0-444-64123-6.
- Savic, Ivanka, ed. (2010). Sex Differences in the Human Brain, their Underpinnings and Implications. Vol. 186 (1st ed.). Elsevier. ISBN 978-0-444-53630-3.
