= The Sexual Brain =

1993 book by Simon LeVay

- Cover of the first edition
- Author: Simon LeVay
- Cover artist: Jean Wilcox
- Language: English
- Subjects: Human brain Human sexuality
- Publisher: MIT Press
- Publication date: 1993
- Publication place: United States
- Media type: Print (Hardcover and Paperback)
- Pages: 168
- ISBN: 978-0585002996

The Sexual Brain is a 1993 book about brain mechanisms involved in sexual behavior and feelings, and related topics such as sexual orientation, by the neuroscientist Simon LeVay. The book was praised as a well-written work on science. However, some reviewers pointed out factual errors, and stated that LeVay failed to prove that homosexuality has a biological basis.

== Summary ==
LeVay discusses "brain mechanisms that are responsible for sexual behavior and feelings"; topics considered include sexual orientation, the evolutionary basis of sex, sexual development, the organization and development of the brain, the neural mechanisms associated with sexual intercourse, gender differences, and gender identity. LeVay expresses skepticism about the work of Sigmund Freud, the founder of psychoanalysis, writing that while he once accepted the Freudian view that "a young child's relations with his or her parents play a decisive role" in the development of sexual orientation, he rejected it after he came to know large numbers of gay men and lesbian women. LeVay writes that he doubts that there is anything scientific about Freud's ideas.

He describes the functions of the hypothalamus, which plays a key role in, "sex, feeding, drinking, cardiovascular performance, control of body temperature, stress, emotional responses, growth, and many other functions". LeVay notes that his INAH 3 study was his only publication on sex to that date, and that most of his previous research had been on the visual areas of the cerebral cortex. LeVay compares homosexuality to the disease sickle cell anemia, arguing that it may have persisted through a similar genetic mechanism.

== Publication history ==
The Sexual Brain was first published in 1993 by MIT Press.

== Reception ==
The Sexual Brain has been praised by authors such as the anthropologist Melvin Konner, who described the book as a good introduction to the biology of gender and a useful guide for understanding the neuroscience of sexual arousal and associated behaviors. The book received positive reviews from the journalist Peter Gorner in the Chicago Tribune, the playwright Kenneth McLeish in The Independent, the psychiatrist Avodah K. Offit in the Los Angeles Times, Robert Friar in the Journal of Sex Research, and the psychologist Richard Gregory in The Times Literary Supplement. The book received mixed reviews from the biologist Anne Fausto-Sterling in BioScience, the physician Richard Horton in The New York Review of Books, Michael J. Baum in the Archives of Sexual Behavior, and from Publishers Weekly. The Sexual Brain received two reviews in New Statesman and Society, one from Peter Tallack and the other from David Fernbach. Other reviews included those by the physician Lawrence D. Mass in The Advocate, Katherine Livingston in Science, Marian Annett in the Times Higher Education Supplement, the critic Michael Warner in The Village Voice, the psychologist Leonore Tiefer in Psychology of Women Quarterly, and the historian of science Daniel Kevles in The New Yorker. Mass subsequently commented that his review strained his relations with some of his colleagues, and that The Advocate's editors "severely truncated" the review, turning it from a "skeptical critique" into "a blurblike endorsement ... used to advertise the book."

Gorner considered the book well-written, and credited LeVay with merging "evolutionary theory, endocrinology, molecular genetics and cognitive psychology into a synthesis that is brilliant and entertaining." McLeish praised LeVay for his criticism of Freud, and for outlining the "current state of knowledge and research on the neurobiology of sexuality" in a "lucid, friendly and comprehensible" style. However, he also wrote that LeVay's arguments about homosexuality "become a touch obsessive." Offit called the book "elegant" and described it as "engaging and professional--a work of stunning scientific scholarship enhanced by gracious style and modesty." However, he noted that LeVay was not "able to prove the biological basis of homosexuality", and that LeVay's findings on INAH 3 could "set us back as a society" by suggesting that homosexuality is abnormal. Friar credited LeVay with "superb writing skills" and "comprehensive knowledge of neurobiology", and called his book "concise, thoughtful, informative" and "interesting". However, he criticized LeVay for giving insufficient attention to lesbianism, for the lack of illustrations in his book, and for using references sparingly. Gregory wrote that the book was "very carefully written, with clear logical threads" and "the statement of a first-rate scientist on issues of personal and social importance".

Fausto-Sterling described The Sexual Brain as well-written and "potentially appropriate for classroom use." However, she found that LeVay's accounts of reproductive physiology and the brain became weaker as he moved further away from neurobiology. She considered LeVay's account of "the embryonic development of gonads and genitalia" an example of this weakness, describing it as "extremely unsophisticated", and accusing LeVay of making inaccurate claims. She criticized LeVay's views on gender differences, including his belief "that female development is passive and preprogrammed ... and male development active", and for failing to cite critiques of that viewpoint. She gave LeVay credit for bringing "a wider range of evidence to bear in examining the interactions among hormones, the brain, and behavior" and citing less well-known work on this topic, and praised LeVay for "declaring his own gay identity", and called his treatment of the relevance of biology to homosexuality "appropriately cautious".

Horton described the book as persuasive and credited LeVay, along with other researchers, with helping make a strong but not definitive case that biological influences play an important or even decisive role in "determining sexual preference among males", and with "taking a "broad philosophical perspective in his discussion of human sexuality by placing his research in the context of animal evolution." He wrote that LeVay supported his contentious view that there are separate centers in the hypothalamus responsible for generating "male-typical and female-typical sexual behavior and feelings" with a wide range of sources, notably that concerning women with congenital adrenal hyperplasia. Though noting that LeVay acknowledged the limitations of his research, he criticized LeVay for having an unsubtle view of the meaning of "biological influence" on sexual orientation that ignores the question of how genes produce an "unpredictable interplay of behavioral impulses", and engaging in "overstretched speculations" about "why a gene for homosexuality still exists when it apparently has little apparent survival value in evolutionary terms." He concluded that while LeVay's work "presents technical and conceptual difficulties" and his "preliminary findings obviously need replication or refutation" it "represents a genuine epistemological break away from the past's rigid and withered conceptions of sexual preference."

Baum described The Sexual Brain as engaging and readable, and ideal for educated laypeople. However, he criticized LeVay for being unaware of some relevant research, and making a number of factual errors, such as that orgasm is caused by the neurotransmitter oxytocin, that female rats fail to display maternal behavior after hypophysectomy, that lesions of the ventromedial nucleus of the hypothalamus reduce presentational behavior displayed by female monkeys, that antiandrogenic drugs block the masculinization of the sexually dimorphic subdivision of the medial preoptic area in male rats, and that vaginal olfactory cues are the primary determinants of masculine sexual arousal in male primates. Publishers Weekly described the book as an "expert, drily written, often technical account of the biological basis of human sexual behavior and orientation" and predicted that it would be equally as controversial as LeVay's "1991 Science article describing a difference in the hypothalamic brain structure of homosexual and heterosexual men."

The Sexual Brain has been criticized by authors such as the queer theorist Robert McRuer, the philosopher Timothy F. Murphy, the biologist Steven Rose, the classicist Bruce Thornton, the psychiatrist and medical historian Vernon Rosario, and the philosopher Edward Stein. McRuer compared The Sexual Brain to the political scientist Charles Murray and the psychologist Richard Herrnstein's The Bell Curve (1994), arguing that just as Murray and Herrnstein presented inequality as inevitable rather than the consequence of economic institutions that could be changed, LeVay failed to question the institution of heterosexuality. Murphy maintained that LeVay failed to show conclusively that the differences in brain structure he found between gay men and straight men were not due to AIDS. Rose criticized the publicity that surrounded the publication of The Sexual Brain, arguing that LeVay over-stated the importance of his findings, behavior which Rose considered similar to that of researchers such as the geneticist Dean Hamer. Rose noted that the sexual orientation of the men in LeVay's hypothalamus study was presumed rather than demonstrated. Thornton questioned the value of LeVay's work, writing that while LeVay asserted that the future would bring progress in understanding the development of sexuality, it was uncertain what good such knowledge would accomplish. Rosario accused LeVay of biological determinism and reductionism. Stein criticized LeVay for failing to discuss social constructionism, despite its relevance to his topic.

Kirkus Reviews wrote in 2010 that The Sexual Brain was "well received, but soon out of date" because of subsequent scientific research.

== See also ==
- Biology and sexual orientation
- Environment and sexual orientation
- The Science of Desire
- Causes of gender incongruence
- Neuroscience of sex differences
