= Human Sexuality (book) =

2003 textbook by Simon LeVay and Sharon Valente

- The first edition
- Author: Simon LeVay; Sharon Valente
- Language: English
- Genre: Non-fiction
- Published: 2003 (W. H. Freeman and Company)
- Publication place: United States
- Media type: Print (hardcover)
- Pages: xviii + 628
- ISBN: 978-0-878-93454-6
- OCLC: 61881148

Human Sexuality is a textbook by Simon LeVay and Sharon Valente, first published in 2003 by W. H. Freeman and Company. Subsequent editions have been published by Sinauer Associates, with the fourth edition appearing in 2012. Starting with the third edition, Valente was replaced by Janice Baldwin as a co-author.

== Reception ==
The first edition was well-received and praised for its comprehensiveness and clear writing. The second edition, published in 2006, was described by William Byne as "an exceptional book that addresses nearly every aspect of sexuality from multiple theoretical, historical, and cultural perspectives." The third edition, published in 2009, as well as the fourth edition, published in 2012, were called an "excellent college and introductory graduate textbook".
