= Sexually dimorphic nucleus =

Cluster in the human hypothalamus

Identifiers
- NeuroLex ID: ilx_0106687
- FMA: 67890

The sexually dimorphic nucleus (SDN) is an ovoid, densely packed cluster of large cells located in the medial preoptic area (POA) of the hypothalamus which is believed to be related to sexual behavior in animals. Thus far, for all species of mammals investigated, the SDN has been repeatedly found to be considerably larger in males than in females. In humans, the volume of the SDN has been found to be 2.2 times as large in males as in females and to contain 2.1 times as many cells. The human SDN is elongated in females and more spherical in males. No sex differences have been observed in the human SDN in either cell density or mean diameter of the cell nuclei. The volume and cell number of the human SDN considerably decreases with age, although the decrease in cell number is both sex and age-specific. In males, a substantial decrease in the cell number of the human SDN was observed between the age of 50–60 years. Cell death was more common in females than males, especially among those older than 70 years of age. The SDN cell number in females can drop to 10-15% of that found in early childhood.

SDN and its homologues exist widely in human, mammal, and some other animal brains, including:

- the third interstitial nucleus of the anterior hypothalamus (INAH3) in humans;
- ovine sexually dimorphic nucleus (oSDN) in the medial preoptic area/anterior hypothalamus (MPOA/AH) in sheep;
- sexually dimorphic nucleus in the preoptic area (SDN-POA) in rats;
- anterior hypothalamic nucleus (AHdc) in macaques;
- specific area in medial preoptic nucleus (POM) in quails; etc.

== Sexually dimorphic nucleus in medial preoptic area ==
=== Formation and organization of SDN in medial preoptic area ===
==== Sex differences in SDN caused by exposure to testosterone (prenatal) ====
The volume of SDN in medial preoptic area is modified by hormones, among which testosterone is proved to be of much importance. The larger volume of male SDN is correlated to the higher concentration of fetal testosterone level in males than in females. Also, there is evidence that testosterone acts during specific prenatal period to organize the development of aromatase-expressing neurons into the male-typical SDN (testosterone is transformed to estrogen by aromatase). The effect of testosterone is also shown by the influence of fetal intrauterine position on the morphology of SDN-POA. Studies demonstrated that male rats which were gestated between two male fetuses (2M) have 2-fold larger SDN-POA volumes than those gestated between two female fetuses (2F). At the same time, the testosterone levels, as well as the 17β-estradiol (product of testosterone) levels, were found to be significantly larger in 2M males than in 2F males on gestation day 21 (testosterone can be transferred from adjacent male fetuses to the target rats). However, evidence fails to show any relationship between SDN volume and female fetal position.

==== Sex differences in the volume of SDN caused by apoptosis (postnatal) ====
According to some studies, the volume difference of SDN between males and females is related to apoptosis during early development after birth. In rats, central division of the medial preoptic nucleus (MPNc) is an important component of SDN-POA and evidence showed that the number of apoptotic cells within MPNc is greater in females than in males between postnatal day (PD) 7 and PD10. In MPNc, the levels of some proteins, which are related to apoptosis, were shown to be of significant difference between males and females. Such proteins include Bcl-2 and Bax. Bcl-2 is an antiapoptotic protein. The level of Bcl-2 in PD8 male rats is much higher than that in female rats of the same age, hence the number of apoptotic cells of MPNc in PD8 male rats is much lower than PD8 female rats. On the other hand, Bax, a proapoptotic protein, shows lower level in PD8 males than in PD8 females. Also, the number of active caspase-3-ir cells was observed to be greater in females than in males, indicating higher level of apoptosis in female MPNc.

Apoptosis also occurs in the anteroventral periventricular nucleus (AVPV), which is also a sexually dimorphic area and is located in the periventricular gray area at the rostral extreme of the third ventricle. In contrast with SDN-POA, AVPV has larger size in females than in males. It is proved that Bcl-2 level in AVPV is higher whereas Bax level is lower in females than in males, just as being opposite of those in MPNc. As indicated in these two cases, apoptotic cell death plays a critical role in the formation of sexually dimorphic nucleus, and the apoptotic cell number within SDN negatively correlates with the volume of SDN between different sexes.

=== Role of SDN in controlling of male sexual behaviors ===
Male sexual behaviors can be divided into two phases: the appetitive phase, which contains highly variable sequence of behaviors such as attracting and courting, and the consummatory phase, during which highly stereotyped copulatory behaviors occur. The medial preoptic area of the brain is considered to control the expression of both male copulation and male appetitive sexual behavior. It is found that large lesions of SDN-POA severely disrupt copulatory behavior in rats. Also, cell-body lesions of SDA pars compacta (a homologue of SDN-POA) in gerbils produce severe disruptions of male copulatory behavior. Moreover, a study on medial preoptic nucleus (POM) (homologue of medial preoptic nucleus in rats) in quails showed that the activation of male copulatory behavior requires the aromatization of androgen (testosterone) into an estrogen (17β-estradiol). Like in SDN-POA, aromatase-expression neurons are a specific marker of the nuclear boundary of POM in quails. The intensity of male copulatory behavior is found to positively correlate with the number of the aromatase-expression neurons in the caudal part of POM.

Appetitive behaviors are also partly controlled by medial preoptic area as aromatase-knockout mice show deficits in sexual motivation. However, appetitive behaviors are disrupted by the lesions in rostral part rather than caudal part of medial preoptic area. Lesions of the rostral part of medial preoptic area also diminish preference for female by male rats. Furthermore, in vivo dialysis experiments showed that the level of extracellular dopamine in the mPOA increases as the sexual appetitive sequences progress. mPOA's involvement in the control of appetitive sexual behaviors is also confirmed by pharmacological manipulations of the dopaminergic system in it. In rats, lesions to mPOA can eliminate the male copulatory behavior but can only diminish appetitive behavior, which suggests that some other parts of the brain, except for mPOA, are also responsible for sexually appetitive behavior.

=== Role of SDN in sexual partner preference ===
==== Role of SDN in male partner preference ====
Researches on the ovine sexually dimorphic nucleus (oSDN) in sheep demonstrate that the volume of oSDN varies with sexual partner preference in male sheep (rams). Homosexual rams (roughly 8% of the population) have been found to have oSDNs that are about half the size of those in heterosexual rams. In one study conducted by Roselli, et al., 4 heterosexual rams and 9 homosexual rams were exposed to 2 estrous ewes and 2 rams, with their sexual behaviors (mounts and ejaculations) being recorded. Heterosexual rams displayed significantly more mounts and ejaculations with ewes than with stimulus rams, whereas homosexual rams showed the opposite. Then series of brain sections, including hypothalamic, temporal lobe and diencephalon tissues, were imaged. Also, in situ hybridization was conducted to examine the level of the expression of cytochrome P450 aromatase in these brain sections. The results showed that the volume of oSDN in heterosexual rams is approximately 2 times greater than that in homosexual rams. The number of neurons within oSDN is significantly greater in homosexual rams than in heterosexual rams, so it is with the mean length of the oSDN. But the neuron density is similar in both kinds of rams. In addition, aromatase mRNA levels are also tested, showing that the level of aromatase mRNA is significantly greater in heterosexual rams than in homosexual rams.

Other species have similar relationships between sexual preferences and the volume of SDN. For example, INAH3 in humans (homologue of oSDN) is significantly larger in heterosexual men than in homosexual men.

==== Damage of SDN and changes in sexual partner preferences in males ====
Bilateral damage to SDN in the medial preoptic area in male ferrets causes the change of males from male-typical preference to female-typical preference. This was first demonstrated in a study published in 1995. In a 2007 study, male ferrets which were sexually experienced and responded to female body odor, when treated by bilateral lesions to SDN, change to respond to male body odor. It is probable that SDN plays an important role in leading to mating and successful reproduction.

==== Role of SDN in female partner preference ====
Although SDN is much related to sexual partner preferences in males, it does not show the same relationship to partner preferences in females. Evidence shows that SDN in medial preoptic area is not the prerequisite for the expression of male-typical sexual behaviour and sexual partner preferences in females. One piece of evidence comes from the study on female Japanese macaque, which routinely court, mount (with pelvic thrust), compete for, and even prefer certain female sexual partners over certain males. The part of the brain examined is the anterior hypothalamic nucleus (AHdc), a homologue of SDN-POA. Comparison of the AHdc nucleus volumes between Japanese macaque and rhesus macaque (a closely related sister species of Japanese macaque) shows that there is no significant difference between the volume of AHdc in more male-typical macaques and that in female-typical macaques.

==== Role of SDN in Human Sexual Orientation ====
In 1991, LeVay published a study of 41 autopsies on 16 heterosexual men, 19 homosexual men, and 6 heterosexual women that targeted the interstitial nuclei of the anterior hypothalamus (INAH 1, 2, 3, and 4). He showed that there were no significant differences between the three groups' INAH 1, 2, and 4, which prior research already showed. However, INAH 3 was larger in heterosexual men in comparison to homosexual men and heterosexual women. This research linked an established sexually dimorphic area of the brain to hetero- and homosexual behavior in men.

A later study determined that the size of the INAH3 of homosexual men was intermediate between that of heterosexual men and heterosexual women. It also determined that the reason why the INAH3 is smaller in homosexual versus heterosexual men is because homosexual men have a higher neuronal packing density (the number of neurons per cubic millimeter) in the INAH3 than heterosexual men; there is no difference in the number or cross-sectional area of neurons in the INAH3 of homosexual versus heterosexual men. It was also found that there is no effect of HIV infection on the size of INAH3, that is, HIV infection cannot account for the observed difference in INAH3 volume between homosexual and heterosexual men.

These findings only partially corroborate LeVay's hypothesis that homosexual males have a "female-like hypothalamus" — given that the INAH3 was smaller in homosexual men, intermediate in size between that of heterosexual males and heterosexual females. Furthermore, the suprachiasmatic nucleus (SCN) of homosexual males is larger than the SCN of heterosexual men and women; both the volume and the number of neurons of the SCN are twice as many in homosexual males than in heterosexual males. These areas of the hypothalamus have not yet been explored in homosexual females nor bisexual males nor females. In sum, some contemporaries cast serious doubt over LeVay's hypothesis that homosexual males have a "female hypothalamus" and that the key mechanism of differentiating the "male brain from originally female brain" is the epigenetic influence of testosterone during prenatal development.

=== Effects of proteins and other molecules on SDN in medial preoptic area ===
==== NELL2 ====
NELL2 is a tissue-specific protein in the nervous system. It contains EGF (epidermal growth factor)-like repeat domain and its gene expression is regulated by estrogen. NELL2 is also known to play a neuroprotective role rat hippocampus neurons. When NELL2 synthesis is blocked by intracerebroventricular injection of antisense (AS) NELL2 oligodeoxynucleotide (ODN) into neonatal male rat brains (postnatal day0-day5), the size of SDN-POA is decreased. Since volume of SDN is related to the level of testosterone, it is quite possible that the volume is finally due to the neuroprotective effect of estradiol which is produced from testosterone by aromatase. So the result that NELL2 blockage reduces the size of SDN-POA suggests that it probably has neuroprotective effect on SDN-POA.

==== Somatostatin ====
The sex-specific transcription of somatostatin gene coincides with the establishment of sex differences in SDN-POA. It is observed that somatostatin mRNA appears in the SDN-POA of both males and females. On postnatal day 8 through postnatal day 35, the area of somatostatin mRNA-positive cells was significantly larger in males than in females, with males attain the maximum size of that area on day15 before decrease whereas females show no changes. Eventually the expression of somatostatin mRNA shows no difference between sexes. It is possible that somatostatin is related to the estrogen-dependent organization of SDN-POA.

==== Fenitrothion ====
Fenitrothion is a kind of organophosphate and it can affect the development of reproductive system of male rats. Treatment with fenitrothion to male rats causes regression of androgen-dependent organ weights because fenitrothion is a potent competitive androgen receptor antagonist. Its effect on SDN-POA is different between male rats and female rats. In male rats, prenatal exposure to fenitrothion causes significantly increase of the volume of SDN-POA; whereas, in female rats, prenatal exposure to fenitrothion causes significantly decrease of the volume of SDN-POA. One possible explanation is that fenitrothion can alter the activity of aromatase, which then alters the level of estrogens converted by it from androgens and finally alters the volume of SDN-POA.

==== Diethylstilbestrol (DES) ====
Diethylstilbestrol (DES) is a synthetic nonsteroidal estrogen and was widely used for preventing threatened abortion. DES also has effect on development of the reproductive system. Low dose of DES exhibits inhibitory effect on plasma testosterone concentration in male rats while promotes follicular maturation in female rats. Experiments were done to see the effects of DES on SDN-POA volume. It is demonstrated that DES treatment altered the volume of SDN-POA in females by increasing it, resulting in larger volume SDN than in untreated females. However, a low dose of DES did not change the volume of the SDN-POA in male rats.

==== Morphine ====
Morphine can also alter the activities within the sexually dimorphic brain regions. Prenatal exposure to morphine increases copulatory behavior in male rats while decreases estrous behavior in female rats.

== Other sexually dimorphic areas in the brain ==
Ventromedial nucleus of the hypothalamus (VMN) has long been considered as a sexually dimorphic nucleus. It is an important region for regulating the sexual responses in female rodents. The neurons within VMN have significant estrogen-dependent functional and structural plasticity. The synaptic organization of the VMN is sexually dimorphic. Females have more dendrite chemical synapses within VMN while males have more somatic synapses within that region. In addition, the size of postsynaptic densities of axospinous and axosomatic synapses is sexually dimorphic, with males having larger density than females. Estrogen plays an important role in modulating the sexually dimorphic synaptic connectivity of VMN. Estradiol levels are high on proestrus rats and return to low levels on diestrus rats. The volume of cell bodies within VMN in proestrus rats and male rats is larger than diestrus rats. Also, proestrus rats have significantly higher synapse density in VMN than diestrus rats. Moreover, Gamma-aminobutyric acid plays a role in VMN development such as sexual differentiation.

The anteroventral periventricular nucleus (AVPV) is a cluster of cells located in the preoptic area of the hypothalamus that is typically larger in females than in males.

== See Also ==
Neuroscience of sex differences
