= Anteroventral periventricular nucleus =

Neuron cluster of the hypothalamus

Identifiers
- NeuroLex ID: birnlex_1401

The anteroventral periventricular nucleus (AVPV) is a small cluster of cells located in the preoptic area of hypothalamus of the brain that is abundant in nuclear hormone receptors in a sexually dimorphic manner, strongly implicated, in rat models, as being neonatally imprinted and subsequently controlling sex-typical physiology and behaviors. This nucleus or cluster of cells is typically of bigger size in females than males, contrary to the sexually dimorphic nucleus (SDN) that is bigger in males.

In rats and mice, the AVPV plus the periventricular nucleus make up the rostral periventricular region of the third ventricle (RP3V). This area is full of kisspeptin-expressing neurons and is involved in regulating GnRH neurons, and is responsible for the LH surge in female mice.
