= OR51A7 =

Protein-coding gene in the species Homo sapiens

Identifiers
- Aliases: OR51A7, OR11-27, olfactory receptor family 51 subfamily A member 7
- External IDs: MGI: 3030410; GeneCards: OR51A7

Gene location (Human)
Chr.	Chromosome 11 (human)
Band	11p15.4	Start	4,903,783 bp
Band	11p15.4	End	4,909,462 bp

Gene location (Mouse)
Chr.	Chromosome 7 (mouse)
Band	7|7 E3	Start	102,611,867 bp
Band	7|7 E3	End	102,624,367 bp
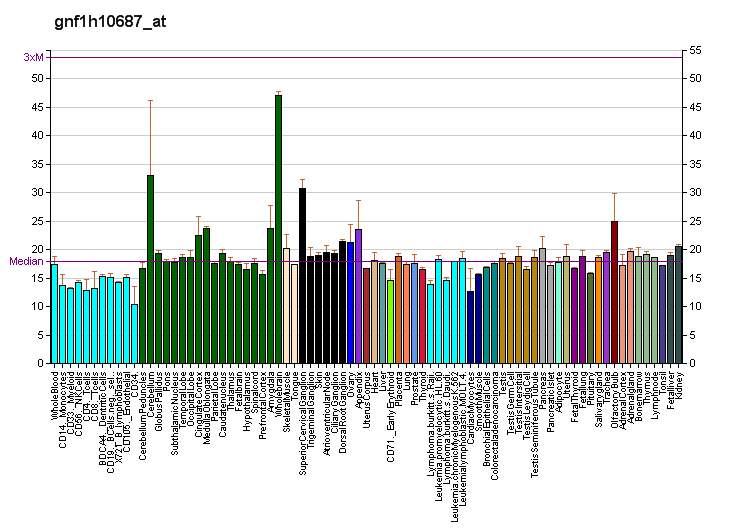
RNA expression pattern
Bgee	Human / Mouse (ortholog); Top expressed in: fundus; prostate / Top expressed in: embryo; adrenal gland; More reference expression data
BioGPS	More reference expression data
Gene ontology
Molecular function	G protein-coupled receptor activity; olfactory receptor activity; signal transducer activity
Cellular component	integral component of membrane; plasma membrane; membrane
Biological process	sensory perception of smell; signal transduction; response to stimulus; detection of chemical stimulus involved in sensory perception of smell; G protein-coupled receptor signaling pathway
Sources:Amigo / QuickGO
Orthologs
Databases	NCBI: entry; OMA: entry
Species	Human	Mouse
Entrez	119687	258248
Ensembl	ENSG00000176895	ENSMUSG00000073962
UniProt	Q8NH64	n/a
RefSeq (mRNA)	NM_001004749	NM_001001805
RefSeq (protein)	NP_001004749	n/a
Location (UCSC)	Chr 11: 4.9 – 4.91 Mb	Chr 7: 102.61 – 102.62 Mb
PubMed search
- Wikidata
View/Edit Human	View/Edit Mouse

Olfactory receptor 51A7 is a protein that in humans is encoded by the OR51A7 gene.

Olfactory receptors interact with odorant molecules in the nose, to initiate a neuronal response that triggers the perception of a smell. The olfactory receptor proteins are members of a large family of G-protein-coupled receptors (GPCR) arising from single coding-exon genes. Olfactory receptors share a 7-transmembrane domain structure with many neurotransmitter and hormone receptors and are responsible for the recognition and G protein-mediated transduction of odorant signals. The olfactory receptor gene family is the largest in the genome. The nomenclature assigned to the olfactory receptor genes and proteins for this organism is independent of other organisms.

== Ligands ==
As of 2015, OR51A7 was an orphan receptor, meaning that no odorants have been identified which bind to it.

== See also ==
- Olfactory receptor
