= Epigenetic theories of homosexuality =

Possible causes of homosexuality

Epigenetic theories of homosexuality concern the studies of changes in gene expression or cellular phenotype caused by mechanisms other than changes in the underlying DNA sequence, and their role in the development of homosexuality. Epigenetics examines the set of chemical reactions that switch parts of the genome on and off at strategic times and locations in the organism's life cycle. However, epigenetic theories tangle a multiplicity of initiating causes and resulting final effects and will never lead to a single cause or single result. Hence, any interpretation of such theories may not focus on just one isolated reason of a multiplicity of causes or effects.

Instead of affecting the organism's DNA sequence, non-genetic factors may cause the organism's genes to express themselves differently. DNA in the human body is wrapped around histones, which are proteins that package and order DNA into structural units. DNA and histone are covered with chemical tags known as the epigenome, which shapes the physical structure of the genome. It tightly wraps inactive genes on the DNA sequence making those genes unreadable while loosely wrapping active genes making them more expressive. The more tightly wrapped the gene, the less it will be expressed in the organism. These epigenetic tags react to stimuli presented from the outside world. It adjusts specific genes in the genome to respond to humans' rapidly changing environments. The idea of epigenetics and gene expression has been a theory applied to the origins of homosexuality in humans. One team of researchers examined the effects of epi-marks buffering XX fetuses and XY fetuses from certain androgen exposure and used published data on fetal androgen signaling and gene regulation through non-genetic changes in DNA packaging to develop a new model for homosexuality. The researchers found that stronger than average epi-marks, epigenomes that are wrapped tightly around the DNA sequence, convert sexual preference in individuals without altering genitalia or sexual identity. However, a later study found that male homosexuality is not linked to low androgen sensitivity or "sex-reversed" epi-marks.

== Epigenetic marks ==
Epigenetic marks (epi-marks) are temporary "switches" that control how our genes are expressed during gestation and after birth. Moreover, epi-marks are modifications of histone proteins. Epigenetic marks are modifications of the methyl and acetyl groups that bind to DNA histones thereby changing how the proteins function and as a result, alter gene expression. Epi-marks change how the histones function and as a result, influence the way genes are expressed. Epigenetic marks promote normal sexual development during fetal development. However, they can be passed on to offspring through the process of meiosis. When they are transferred from one parent to an offspring of the opposite sex, it can contribute to an altered sexual development, thus leading to masculinization of female offspring and feminization of male offspring. However, these epi-marks hold no consistency between individuals in regard to strength and variability.

== Twin studies ==
Identical twins have nearly identical DNA, which leads to the perceived conclusion that all identical twins are either heterosexual or homosexual. However, it is evident that this is not the case, consequently leaving a gap in the explanation for homosexuality. Epigenetic modifications act as temporary "switches" that regulate how the genes are expressed. Of the pairs of identical twins in which one twin is homosexual, the other twin, despite having the same genome, only has a 20-50% chance of being homosexual as well. This leads to the hypothesis that homosexuality is created by something else rather than the genes. Epigenetic transformation allows the on and off switching of certain genes, subsequently shaping how cells respond to androgen signaling, which is critical in sexual development. Another example of epigenetic consequences is evident in multiple sclerosis in monozygotic (identical) twins. There are pairs of twins that are discordant with multiple sclerosis and do not both show the trait. After gene testing, it was suggested that DNA was identical and that epigenetic differences contributed to the gene difference between identical twins.

== Effects of fetal androgen exposure ==
While in the fetal stages, hormonal influences of androgen, specifically testosterone, cause feminine qualities in regard to sexual development in females and masculine qualities in males. In typical sexual development, females are exposed to minimal amounts of testosterone, thus feminizing their sexual development, while males are typically exposed to high levels of testosterone, which masculinize their development. Epi-marks play a critical role in this development by acting as a buffer between the fetus and androgen exposure. Moreover, they predominantly protect male fetuses from androgen underexposure while protecting female fetuses from androgen overexposure. However, when androgen overexposure happens in female fetuses, research suggests they can show masculinized behavior in comparison to females who undergo normal levels of androgen exposure. The research also suggests that excess androgen exposure in females led to reduced heterosexual interest in adulthood than did females with normal levels of androgen.

== Heritability ==
New epi-marks are usually produced with each generation, but these marks sometimes carry over between generations. Sex-specific epi-marks are produced in early fetal development that protect each sex from the natural disparity in testosterone that occurs during later stages of fetal development. Different epi-marks protect different sex-specific traits from being masculinized or feminized—some affect the genitals, others affect sexual identity, and yet others affect sexual preference. However, when these epi-marks are transmitted across generations from fathers to daughters or mothers to sons, they may cause reversed effects, such as the feminization of some traits in sons and similarly a partial masculinization of daughters. Furthermore, the reversed effects of feminization and masculinization can lead to a reversed sexual preference. For example, sex-specific epi-marks normally prevent female fetuses from being masculinized through exposure of atypically high testosterone, and vice versa for male fetuses. Sex-specific epi-marks are normally erased and not passed between generations. However, they can sometimes escape erasure and are then transferred from a father's genes to a daughter or from a mother's genes to a son. When this happens, this may lead to an altered sexual preference. Epi-marks normally protect parents from variation in sex hormone levels during fetal development, but can carry over across generations and subsequently lead to homosexuality in opposite-sex offspring. This demonstrates that gene coding for these epi-marks can spread in the population because they benefit the development and fitness of the parent but only rarely escape erasure, leading to same-sex sexual preference in offspring.

== Limitations of the hypothesis ==
Epigenetic explanations for sexual orientation are still purely speculative. W. Rice and colleagues say that they "cannot provide definitive evidence that homosexuality has a epigenetic underpinning". Tuck C. Ngun and Eric Vilain published a paper in 2014 in which they evaluated and critiqued the epigenetic model proposed by Rice and colleagues in 2012. Ngun and Vilain agreed with much of Rice's model, but disagreed that "sex-reversing sensitivity to androgen signaling via epigenetic markers will result in homosexuality in both sexes", noting that non-heterosexuality is far more common in women. Also, a report of a study of 34 male monozygotic twin pairs discordant for sexual orientation revealed no support for the epigenetic hypothesis.
