= SLITRK6 =

Protein-coding gene in the species Homo sapiens

Identifiers
- Aliases: SLITRK6, DFNMYP, SLIT and NTRK like family member 6
- External IDs: OMIM: 609681; MGI: 2443198; GeneCards: SLITRK6

Gene location (Human)
Chr.	Chromosome 13 (human)
Band	13q31.1	Start	85,792,790 bp
Band	13q31.1	End	85,806,683 bp

Gene location (Mouse)
Chr.	Chromosome 14 (mouse)
Band	14|14 E3	Start	110,986,012 bp
Band	14|14 E3	End	110,992,581 bp
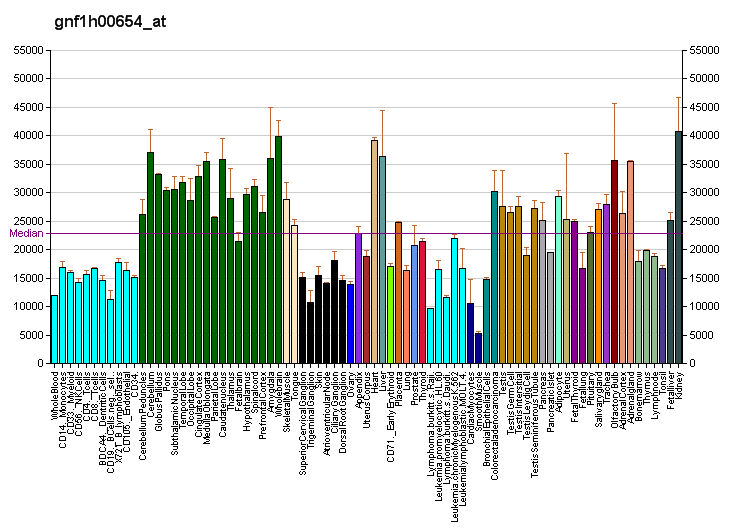

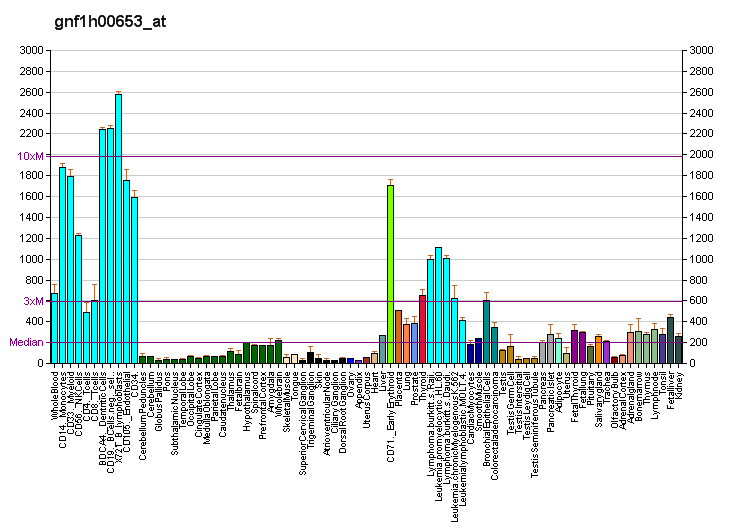
RNA expression pattern
Bgee	Human / Mouse (ortholog); Top expressed in: bronchial epithelial cell; urethra; mucosa of ileum; nasal epithelium; skin of arm; urinary bladder; trachea; minor salivary glands; mucosa of paranasal sinus; jejunal mucosa / Top expressed in: otolith organ; utricle; vestibular sensory epithelium; maxillary prominence; medial dorsal nucleus; islet of Langerhans; otic vesicle; skin of face; genital tubercle; migratory enteric neural crest cell; More reference expression data
BioGPS	More reference expression data
Orthologs
Databases	NCBI: entry; OMA: entry
Species	Human	Mouse
Entrez	84189	239250
Ensembl	ENSG00000184564	ENSMUSG00000045871
UniProt	Q9H5Y7	Q8C110
RefSeq (mRNA)	NM_032229	NM_175499
RefSeq (protein)	NP_115605	NP_780708
Location (UCSC)	Chr 13: 85.79 – 85.81 Mb	Chr 14: 110.99 – 110.99 Mb
PubMed search
- Wikidata
View/Edit Human	View/Edit Mouse

SLIT and NTRK-like protein 6 is a protein that in humans is encoded by the SLITRK6 gene.

== Function ==
Members of the SLITRK family, such as SLITRK6, are integral membrane proteins with 2 N-terminal leucine-rich repeat (LRR) domains similar to those of SLIT proteins (see SLIT1). Most SLITRKs, including SLITRK6, also have C-terminal regions that share homology with neurotrophin receptors (see NTRK1). SLITRKs are expressed predominantly in neural tissues and have neurite-modulating activity.

== Clinical significance ==
Mutations in SLITRK6 cause high myopia and deafness in humans and mice.

== As a drug target ==
The protein is the target for the antibody-drug conjugate ASG-15ME which is in phase 1 clinical trials for urothelial cancer.
