= Gay, Straight, and the Reason Why =

2011 book by Simon LeVay

Gay, Straight, and the Reason Why: The Science of Sexual Orientation
- Cover of the first edition
- Author: Simon LeVay
- Cover artist: Scott Camazine
- Language: English
- Subject: Sexual orientation
- Publisher: Oxford University Press
- Publication date: 2011
- Publication place: United States
- Media type: Print (Hardcover and Paperback)
- Pages: 412 (first edition); 246 (second edition)
- ISBN: 978-0-19-973767-3 (hardback); 978-0-19-993158-3 (paperback)

Gay, Straight, and the Reason Why: The Science of Sexual Orientation (2011; second edition 2016) is a book by the neuroscientist Simon LeVay and published by Oxford University Press. The book received mainly positive reviews, praising it for LeVay's wide-ranging overview of scientific research on sexual orientation. In 2012, it received the Bullough Book Award for the most distinguished book written for the professional sexological community published in a given year.

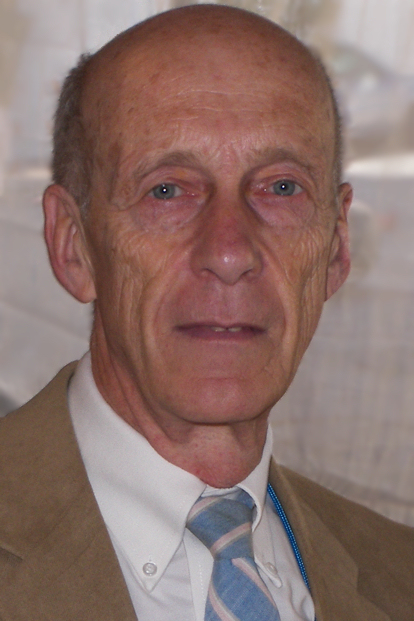
Simon LeVay

== Bibliography ==
Books

- LeVay, Simon (2012). Gay, Straight, and the Reason Why: The Science of Sexual Orientation. New York: Oxford University Press. ISBN 978-0-19-993158-3.
- LeVay, Simon (2017). Gay, Straight, and the Reason Why: The Science of Sexual Orientation. Second Edition. New York: Oxford University Press. ISBN 978-0-19-029737-4.

Journals

- Anderson, W. P. (2011). "Gay, straight, and the reason why: the science of sexual orientation". Choice: Current Reviews for Academic Libraries. 48 (8). – via EBSCO's Academic Search Complete (subscription required)
- Blum, Deborah (2010). "Gay: born or made?". New Scientist. 208 (2784): 53. Bibcode:2010NewSc.208Q..53B. doi:10.1016/S0262-4079(10)62703-0.
- Jones, Stanton L. (2012). "Gay, Straight, and the Reason Why: The Science of Sexual Orientation". Christian Scholar's Review. 41 (2). – via EBSCO's Academic Search Complete (subscription required)
- Leleux, Robert (2010). "Driving While Gay". The Texas Observer. 102 (17). – via EBSCO's Academic Search Complete (subscription required)
- Lippa, Richard (2011). "A New Look at the Causes and Correlates of Sexual Orientation". Sex Roles. 65 (5/6): 442–443. doi:10.1007/s11199-011-9997-1. S2CID 141698620. – via EBSCO's Academic Search Complete (subscription required)
- Payne, Drew (2013). "Gay, Straight, and the Reason Why - The Science of Sexual Orientation". Nursing Standard. 27 (41). doi:10.7748/ns2013.06.27.41.29.s38. – via EBSCO's Academic Search Complete (subscription required)
- Rosario, Vernon (2011). "Of Genes, Genitals, and Gender". The Gay & Lesbian Review Worldwide. 18 (4). – via EBSCO's Academic Search Complete (subscription required)
- Woolwine, David (2011). "Gay, Straight, and the Reason Why: The Science of Sexual Orientation". GLBTRT Newsletter: Gay, Lesbian, Bisexual, & Transgendered Round Table. 23 (1). – via EBSCO's Academic Search Complete (subscription required)
- "Gay, Straight, and the Reason Why: The Science of Sexual Orientation". Kirkus Reviews. 78 (18). 2010. – via EBSCO's Academic Search Complete (subscription required)
- "Gay, Straight, and the Reason Why: The Science of Sexual Orientation". Publishers Weekly. 257 (31). 2010. – via EBSCO's Academic Search Complete (subscription required)

Online articles

- Hoffman, Louis; Lincoln, Justin (13 April 2011). "Science, Interpretation, and Identity in the Sexual Orientation Debate: What Does Finger Length Have To Do With Understanding a Person?" (PDF). PsycCRITIQUES.
- LeVay, Simon (2013). "My Books". Simon LeVay's website.
- Ruse, Michael (24 August 2012). "What Freud didn't know about being gay". The Globe and Mail.
- Schlichenmeyer, Terri (26 November 2010). "Born this way". Dallas Voice.
- Velasco, Schuyler (25 October 2010). ""Gay, Straight, and the Reason Why": Where does homosexuality come from?". Salon. Archived from the original on 20 January 2013.
