= INAH 3 =

Third interstitial nucleus of the anterior hypothalamus

Interstitial nucleus of the anterior hypothalamus

INAH-3 is the short form for the third interstitial nucleus of the anterior hypothalamus, and is the sexually dimorphic nucleus of humans. The INAH-3 is significantly larger in males than in females regardless of age and larger in heterosexual males than in homosexual males and heterosexual females. Homologs of the INAH-3 have been found to play a direct role in sexual behavior in quails, rhesus macaques, sheep, rats, mice, and ferrets.

== Research ==
The term INAH (interstitial nuclei of the anterior hypothalamus), first proposed in 1989 by a group of the University of California at Los Angeles, refers to 4 previously undescribed cell groups of the preoptic-anterior hypothalamic area (PO-AHA) of the human brain, which is a structure that influences gonadotropin secretion, maternal behavior, and sexual behavior in several mammalian species. There are four nuclei in the PO-AHA (INAH1-4). One of these nuclei, INAH-3, was found to be 2.8 times larger in the male brain than in the female brain regardless of age.

A study authored by Simon LeVay and published in the journal Science suggests that the region is an important biological substrate with regard to sexual orientation. This article reported the INAH-3 to be smaller on average in homosexual men than in heterosexual men, and in fact has approximately the same size in homosexual men as in heterosexual women. Further research has found that the INAH3 is smaller in volume in homosexual men than in heterosexual men because homosexual men have a higher neuronal packing density (the number of neurons per cubic millimeter) in the INAH3 than heterosexual men; there is no difference in the number or cross-sectional area of neurons in the INAH3 of homosexual versus heterosexual men. (Note: In their study, Byne et al. found that there was a trend for the INAH3 to be smaller in homosexual men than heterosexual men though the size difference did not quite reach statistical significance by the test that they employed. LeVay notes that Byne et al. used a two-tailed t-test, which is the appropriate test in cases where there is no prediction about the direction of a difference. However, LeVay explains that because his 1991 study had determined the INAH3 to be smaller in homosexual versus heterosexual men, using a one-tailed test would have been appropriate. In addition, a one-tailed test would have found a statistically significant difference in INAH3 size between homosexual and heterosexual men.) It has also been found that there is no effect of HIV infection on the size of INAH3, that is, HIV infection cannot account for the observed difference in INAH3 volume between homosexual and heterosexual men. A reference to a structural MRI study as failing to replicate LeVay's findings may be misleading given the methodological differences and the limited spatial resolution of structural MRI relative to the small size of the region in question.

LeVay noted three possibilities that could account for his findings: 1. The structural differences in INAH3 between homosexual and heterosexual males were present prenatally or in early life and aided in establishment of the men's sexual orientation; 2. The differences appeared postnatally as a result of the men's sexual feelings or behavior and; 3. Both the differences in INAH3 and sexual orientation are linked to some third confounding variable (such as a developmental event in prenatal or early life). LeVay found the first possibility most probable and noted that the second possibility was unlikely in light of various homologous studies in other species. It has been suggested that the human INAH-3 is the homologue of the rat's SDN-POA.

Other researchers have studied correlations between INAH-3 volume and other aspects of sexual identity. A study of transgender individuals by neuroanatomist Dick Swaab found male-to-female transgender people to have a size and number of neurons of INAH-3 closer to a normal female range, and that female-to-male transgender people have a size and number of INAH-3 neurons closer to a normal male range. This finding that the size of the INAH-3 more closely corresponded to the gender the subject identified with rather than their biological or chromosomal gender has since been repeated, but is still controversial due to potential confounds of hormone replacement therapy.

== See also ==
- The Sexual Brain
