= Queer Science =

1996 book

- Author: Simon LeVay
- Publisher: MIT Press
- Publication date: 1996
- Pages: 364
- ISBN: 0-262-12199-9

Queer Science: The Use and Abuse of Research into Homosexuality is a 1996 book by neuroscientist Simon LeVay on the scientific explanations for homosexuality.

== Bibliography ==
- Boellstorff, Tom; Cohen, Lawrence (1997). "Queer Science Indeed". Scientific American. 277 (4): 146–148. Bibcode:1997SciAm.277d.146B. doi:10.1038/scientificamerican1097-146. ISSN 0036-8733. JSTOR 24995972.
- Herness, Scott (1998). LeVay, Simon (ed.). "Less than Objective: The Corrupted Science of Being Different". The Journal of Sex Research. 35 (1): 117–120. ISSN 0022-4499. JSTOR 3813170.
- Horvath, Christopher D. (1997). "Review of Queer Science: The Use and Abuse of Research into Homosexuality". Isis. 88 (2): 376–377. doi:10.1086/383761. ISSN 0021-1753. JSTOR 236643.
- Hull, David L. (1997). "Review of Queer Science: The Use and Abuse of Research Into Homosexuality". The Quarterly Review of Biology. 72 (2): 233. doi:10.1086/419842. ISSN 0033-5770. JSTOR 3036414.
- Weijer, Charles (1996). "Review of Queer Science: The Use and Abuse of Research into Homosexuality". BMJ: British Medical Journal. 313 (7063): 1017. doi:10.1136/bmj.313.7063.1017. ISSN 0959-8138. JSTOR 29733242. PMC 2352311.
