= Simon LeVay =

British-American neuroscientist (born 1943)

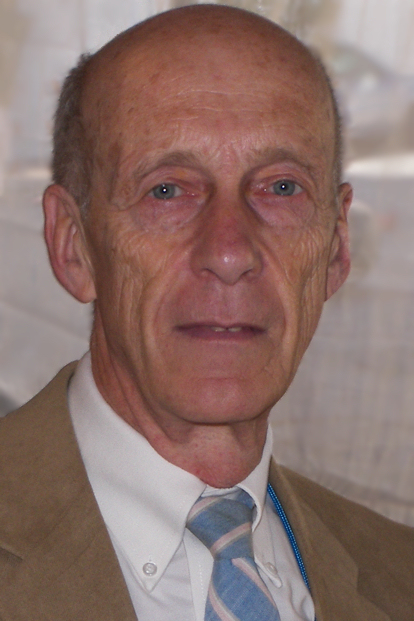
- Simon LeVay at the 2010 Texas Book Festival
- Born: 28 August 1943 (age 83); Oxford, England
- Citizenship: English, American
- Education: University of Cambridge (B.A.); University of Göttingen (PhD)
- Scientific career
- Fields: Neuroscience, Neurobiology, Human Sexuality
- Workplaces: Harvard Medical School; Salk Institute; University of California, San Diego; Stanford University
- Website: www.simonlevay.com

Simon LeVay (born 28 August 1943 in Oxford, England) is a British-American neuroscientist.

He received a bachelor's degree in natural sciences from the University of Cambridge in 1966, a Ph.D. in Neuroanatomy at the University of Göttingen in Germany, and completed his postdoctoral fellowship at Harvard Medical School in 1974.

LeVay held positions in neurobiology at the Harvard Medical School from 1974 to 1984. He then worked at the Salk Institute for Biological Studies from 1984 to 1993 while holding an associate professorship in biology at the University of California, San Diego. Much of his early work focused on the visual cortex in animals.

While working at the Salk Institute for Biological Studies, LeVay published an article in Science that compared the size of the "Interstitial Nucleus of the Anterior Hypothalamus" (INAH3) in a group of gay men to a group of straight men and women. This was the first scientific study ever published that showed brain differences based on sexual orientation. The study results were featured on PBS, Newsweek, Nightline, Donahue, and The Oprah Winfrey Show.

In 1992, he took a leave of absence from Salk to help form the Institute of Gay and Lesbian Education (IGLE) in West Hollywood with Chris Patrouch and Lauren Jardine. He never returned.

LeVay has spoken extensively on the topic of human sexuality at a number of venues and published a number of books. In 2003 he became a lecturer in Human Sexuality Studies at Stanford University.

== Personal life ==
Simon LeVay was born on 28 August 1943 in Oxford, England. LeVay spent most of his childhood in West Dulwich where he attended Dulwich Preparatory School. LeVay went on to attend Dulwich College, where he specialized in Latin, Greek, and ancient history while excelling in cycling. It was at Dulwich College where LeVay also admitted to himself that he was gay.

== Education ==
Before moving on to higher education, LeVay spent a gap year in Göttingen Germany where he worked as a technician in an electron microscope lab, learned German, and published a scientific article on the spinal cord of chickens. When the gap year was complete, LeVay returned to England, where he was admitted into Cambridge University. After graduating with a B.A. in natural sciences, he continued the clinical portion of his medical education at the University College Hospital in London before dropping out of medical school altogether.

LeVay returned to the lab in Göttingen and enrolled in graduate school, where he published his doctoral thesis on the visual system before graduating with a Ph.D. in neuroanatomy in 1971. At the University of Göttingen, LeVay met an American exchange student from the University of California, Berkeley named Richard Hersey and fell in love. When Hersey left Germany and returned to the United States, LeVay followed him and began looking at postdoctoral positions in Boston, New York, and Wisconsin. He eventually got a job at Harvard Medical School working in the lab of David Hubel and Torsten Wiesel. LeVay and Hersey spent a year traveling in the United States before Hersey returned to Berkeley, and LeVay started his life in Boston.

== Career ==
LeVay completed his postdoc at Harvard Medical School and began teaching in the Neurobiology Department.

In 1984, LeVay accepted a job at the Salk Institute in San Diego, California where he studied the brain's role in vision. He also began working as an associate professor in biology at the University of California.

LeVay took a leave of absence to take care of Hersey, who had contracted AIDS. After Hersey died of the disease in 1990, LeVay returned to Salk with little interest in continuing his work on the visual centers of the brain. "Richard and I had spent 21 years together," LeVay said during an interview with a reporter from Discover magazine. "It was while looking after him that I decided I wanted to do something different with my life ... I had an emotional need to do something more personal, something connected with my gay identity."

In 1991, LeVay published an article in Science that compared a structure in the hypothalamus called INAH3 in the brains of male homosexuals to that found in a group of heterosexual men and heterosexual women. He found that this region of the brain in gay men was similar to that found in straight women.

In 1992, LeVay took a second leave of absence from Salk to help form the Institute of Gay and Lesbian Education (IGLE) in West Hollywood with Chris Patrouch and Lauren Jardine. He never returned. After IGLE folded, LeVay would go on to speak on the topic of human sexuality at a number of venues and published books.

In 2003 he became a lecturer in Human Sexuality Studies at Stanford University.

== INAH3 research ==
Researchers had been comparing the brains of men and women since the 1980s, but the article that caught LeVay's attention was published by a group at UCLA. In the study, the researchers compared the hypothalami of 11 men to 11 women. Of particular interest to LeVay was an area the researchers called the "Interstitial Nucleus of the Anterior Hypothalamus" (INAH3), a part of the brain that had been found to help regulate sexual behavior. The UCLA team found that INAH3 was, on average, twice as large in men as it was in women. This made LeVay wonder if he would see differences in this grouping of cells based on sexual orientation as well.

"I was already working on structure and function in one part of the brain, so working on the sexual part of the brain wasn't a big switch."

Over a period of nine months, LeVay performed surgery on the brains of 41 cadavers: 18 gay men (plus 1 bisexual male), 16 straight men, and 6 straight women. To ensure that the process was fully blinded, he'd had each brain numerically encoded to conceal the sexual orientations of each donor.

In 1991, LeVay published "A difference in hypothalamic structure between heterosexual and homosexual men" in Science. On average, LeVay found that the INAH3 in the brains of heterosexual men were more than twice as large as those found in the brains of homosexuals. In fact, the INAH3 size of the homosexual group was the same as that of the women. LeVay wrote that "[t]his finding indicates that INAH is dimorphic with sexual orientation, at least in men, and suggests that sexual orientation has a biological substrate."

This was the first scientific study that looked specifically at differences between brains on the basis of sexual orientation. Because of this, LeVay's finding attracted a lot of media attention. The study results were featured on PBS, Newsweek, Nightline, Donahue, and The Oprah Winfrey Show.

The results received pushback from some religious groups as well as from members of the LGBT community. There were also several criticisms from scientists:

- HIV can attack the central nervous system, and nearly all of the gay men in LeVay's study had died of AIDS. What effect, if any, did HIV have on this region of the brain? Were the perceived differences the result of biology or because of HIV's actions on the brain?
- LeVay's study only considered 41 brain samples. Too few data points can make study results unreliable.
- In straight males, LeVay found that the INAH3 structure was about the size of a grain of sand. In women (and in gay men), it was almost non-existent. Because of the extremely small size, these structures could be difficult to precisely measure in tissue slices.
- LeVay's data showed a range of size values for INAH3 in both the homosexual and heterosexual brains. Some of the gay men had larger INAH3 structures, some of the straight men had smaller structures, and the numbers overlapped. Anne Fausto-Sterling at Brown University said, "If LeVay picked a nucleus size in the middle, he couldn't tell if it was heterosexual or homosexual."
- The brain influences the way the person acts, but the environment can influence brain structures. There was not enough information about the people in the study to know whether the results were biological in nature, or whether the behavior of the gay participants caused that region of the brain to change over time.

LeVay himself cautioned against misinterpreting his findings: "I did not prove that homosexuality is genetic, or find a genetic cause for being gay. I didn't show that gay men are born that way, the most common mistake people make in interpreting my work. Nor did I locate a gay center in the brain."

In an interview with Newsweek in 1992, he said, "What I reported was a difference in the brain structure of the hypothalamus. We can't say on the basis of that what makes people gay or straight. But it opens the door to find the answer to that question."

== Institute of Gay and Lesbian Education ==
After Governor Pete Wilson vetoed California Bill AB101 which would have extended civil rights protections to the LGBT community, LeVay became active in the community. While attending a gay political group, he met a planner in West Hollywood by the name of Chris Patrouch. In their conversations Patrouch pitched the idea of creating a new educational institution in West Hollywood that would be gay friendly. LeVay liked the idea so much that he took a leave of absence from Salk in 1992 to help.

They were planning to call the institution the "Harvey Milk University" after the first openly gay elected supervisor of San Francisco that had been assassinated by Dan White in 1987. However, they eventually formed the West Hollywood Institute of Gay and Lesbian Education (IGLE) with Lauren Jardine. The West Hollywood City Counsel unanimously passed a resolution giving IGLE free space in a building owned by the city and IGLE began offering classes in 1992.

IGLE did not meet enrollment expectations that first year. Boxall reports that 14 of 22 classes that had been listed in the course catalog had been canceled due to lack of enrollment. Two years later IGLE's administrators were still struggling with whether the school was going to concentrate on teaching classes focused on gay and lesbian studies, or whether it was going to focus on teaching conventional subjects to LGBT students.

Patrouch and LeVay had been hoping to get their courses accredited and start offering degrees, but the situation proved untenable and IGLE shut down in 1996.

== Books ==
=== The Sexual Brain ===
The Sexual Brain, published in 1993, was LeVay's first book. It discussed brain mechanisms involved in sexual behavior and feelings.

=== Queer Science ===
Queer Science: The Use and Abuse of Research into Homosexuality, published in 1996, was a survey of sexual orientation research. It discussed the work of pioneering sexologists such as Karl Heinrich Ulrichs and Magnus Hirschfeld, Sigmund Freud and his followers, behaviorism, and LeVay's own research on INAH3 and its possible implications.

=== Albrick's Gold ===
Albrick's Gold, published in 1997, was a science fiction novel, whose main character, Roger Cavendish, is partially based on Simon LeVay.

=== Gay, Straight, and the Reason Why ===
Gay, Straight, and the Reason Why: The Science of Sexual Orientation, first published in 2010, details findings from over 650 studies on sexual orientation, including findings he had not considered: "I didn't expect the avenue of research about birth order, that gay men tend to be late born in families, and that women aren't as fixed in their sexual orientation as are men." A second edition was released in 2016. In 2010, Gay, Straight, and the Reason Why won the Bonnie and Vern L. Bullough Award which is given by the Foundation for the Scientific Study of Sexuality to the most distinguished book written for the professional sexological community.

=== Other books ===
LeVay has also co-authored a textbook on human sexuality and books on earthquakes, volcanoes, Parkinson's disease, and extraterrestrial life. Human Sexuality (now in its third edition) was described in one review as "an exceptional book that addresses nearly every aspect of sexuality from multiple theoretical, historical, and cultural perspectives."

== Works ==
- LeVay S (1993). The Sexual Brain. Cambridge: MIT Press. ISBN 0-262-62093-6
- LeVay S, Nonas E (1995). City of Friends: A Portrait of the Gay and Lesbian Community in America. Cambridge: MIT Press. ISBN 0-262-12194-8
- LeVay S (1996). Queer Science: The Use and Abuse of Research into Homosexuality. Cambridge: MIT Press. ISBN 0-262-12199-9
- LeVay S (1997). Albrick's Gold. London: Headline Book Publishing. ISBN 0-7472-7687-0
- Sieh K, LeVay, S (1998). The Earth in Turmoil: Earthquakes, Volcanoes, and Their Impact on Humankind. New York: W.H. Freeman. ISBN 0-7167-3151-7
- Koerner, D, LeVay, S (2000). Here Be Dragons: The Scientific Quest for Extraterrestrial Life. Oxford: Oxford University Press. ISBN 0-19-512852-4
- Freed, C, LeVay, S (2002). Healing the Brain: A Doctor's Controversial Quest for a Cell Therapy to Cure Parkinson's Disease. New York: Times Books. ISBN 0-8050-7091-5
- LeVay S, (2008). When Science Goes Wrong, Plume. ISBN 0-452-28932-7
- LeVay S, Baldwin J (Fourth ed., 2012). Human Sexuality. Sunderland: Sinauer Associates. ISBN 0-87893-570-3
- LeVay S, Baldwin J, Baldwin J (Sixth ed., 2025). Discovering Human Sexuality. New York: Oxford University Press. ISBN 9780197750360
- LeVay S, (Second ed., 2016). Gay, Straight, and the Reason Why: The Science of Sexual Orientation. New York: Oxford University Press. ISBN 9780190297374
- LeVay S, (2013). The Donation of Constantine: A Novel. Los Angeles: Lambourn Books. ISBN 978-1470132156
- LeVay S, (2023). Attraction, Love, Sex: The Inside Story. New York: Columbia University Press. ISBN 9780231204507
- LeVay S, (2025). The Adventures of DeeBug: A Queer Young Adult Novel. Los Angeles: Lambourn Books. ISBN 9798284202142
