= Keith Griffiths =

Keith Griffiths may refer to:

- Keith Griffiths (footballer) (1927–2015), English goalkeeper
- Keith Griffiths (architect) (born 1954), Chairman of Aedas International and Founder and benefactor of the Griffiths-Roch Foundation
- Keith Griffiths (filmmaker), producer of The Piano Tuner of Earthquakes
- Keith Griffiths (rugby league), see List of Parramatta Eels players

== See also ==
- Keith Griffith (1947–2025), technical director of the US Virgin Islands soccer team
- Darrell Keith Griffith (1959–2012), American gay activist
- Keith Griffin (disambiguation)
- Griffiths (surname)
