= Impact of Event Scale – Revised =

Impact of Event Scale-Revised (IES-R)
- Purpose: Assesses subjective distress caused by traumatic events

The Impact of Event Scale-Revised (IES-R) is a 22-item self-report questionnaire designed to assess subjective distress caused by traumatic events. It is commonly used in research and clinical settings to measure the severity of symptoms related to post-traumatic stress disorder (PTSD). The IES-R is an updated version of the original Impact of Event Scale (IES) and includes additional items to provide a more comprehensive assessment.

The 15-item IES is the original scale, but is missing the symptom of hyperarousal. The IES-R is a revised version of the older version, the 15-item IES. The IES-R contains seven additional items related to the hyperarousal symptoms of PTSD, which were not included in the original IES. Items correspond directly to 14 of the 17 DSM-IV symptoms of PTSD. Respondents are asked to identify a specific stressful life event and then indicate how much they were distressed or bothered during the past seven days by each "difficulty" listed. The scale shows good measurement invariance as a one factor scale with both latino and non-latino populations.

Items are rated on a 5-point scale ranging from 0 ("not at all") to 4 ("extremely"). The IES-R yields a total score (ranging from 0 to 88) and subscale scores can also be calculated for the Intrusion, Avoidance, and Hyperarousal subscales. The authors recommend using means instead of raw sums for each of these subscale scores to allow comparison with scores from the Symptom Checklist 90-Revised (SCL-90-R; Derogatis, 1994). In general, the IES-R, and IES are not used to diagnosis PTSD. However, cut-off scores for a preliminary diagnosis of PTSD have been cited in the literature.

An example question is: "Any reminders brought back feelings about it." (Respondents rate their degree of distress during the past seven days.)

== Questionnaire ==
=== Subscales ===
- Avoidance Subscale = mean of items 5, 7, 8, 11, 12, 13, 17 and 22.
- Intrusoin Subscale = mean of items 1, 2, 3, 6, 9, 14, 16 and 20.
- Hyperarousal Subscale = mean of items 4, 10, 15, 18, 19 and 21.

=== Questions ===
These questions are from the Impact of Events Scale - Revised (IES-R).

1. Any reminder brought back feelings about it (intrusion)
2. I had trouble staying asleep (intrusion)
3. Other things kept making me think about it (intrusion)
4. I felt irritable and angry (hyperarousal)
5. I avoided letting myself get upset when I thought about it or was reminded of it (avoidance)
6. I thought about it when I didn't mean to (intrusion)
7. I felt as if it hadn't happened or wasn't real (avoidance)
8. I stayed away from reminders about it (avoidance)
9. Pictures about it popped into my mind (intrusion)
10. I was jumpy and easily startled (hyperarousal)
11. I tried not to think about it (avoidance)
12. I was aware that I still had a lot of feelings about it, but I didn't deal with them (avoidance)
13. My feelings about it were kind of numb (avoidance)
14. I found myself acting or feeling like I was back at that time (intrusion)
15. I had trouble falling asleep (hyperarousal)
16. I had waves of strong feelings about it (intrusion)
17. I tried to remove it from my memory (avoidance)
18. I had trouble concentrating (hyperarousal)
19. Reminders of it caused me to have physical reactions, such as sweating, trouble breathing, nausea, or a pounding heart (hyperarousal)
20. I had dreams about it (intrusion)
21. I felt watchful and on guard (hyperarousal)
22. I tried not to think about it (avoidance)

== Alternatives ==
The PCL-5 is an alternative to the IES-R and is a 20-item self-report measure developed by the U.S. National Center for PTSD. Total scores range from 0 to 80.
