= Keith Griffin =

Keith Griffin may refer to:

- Keith Griffin (economist) (born 1938), British economist
- Keith Griffin (American football) (born 1961), former American football running back

== See also ==
- Griffin (surname)
- Keith Griffith (1947–2025), footballer from Barbados
- Keith Griffiths (disambiguation)
