= Claudia Ann Scott =

Lesbian poet and activist

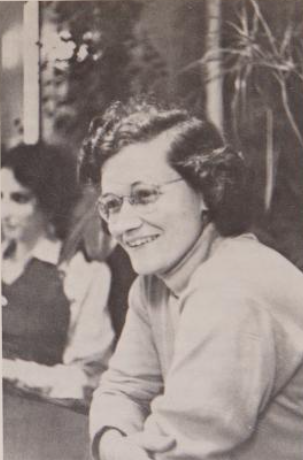
- Born: October 31, 1948; Placentia, California, U.S.
- Died: December 22, 1979 (aged 31)
- Occupations: Poet, Activist
- Notable work: Portrait, 1974 In This Morning, 1979 Lesbian Writer: Collected Work of Claudia Scott, 1981 (Published posthumously)
- Family: Scott O'Hara

Claudia (Ann) Scott (October 31, 1948 – December 22, 1979) was an American poet and lesbian activist. She was the first of seven children of Robert Hogue Scott and Martha Jane Scott in Placentia, California. Claudia spent her childhood in California before moving to Grant's Pass, Oregon, where she graduated from high school. She left Oregon to attend college at Washington University in St. Louis, where she came out as a lesbian. She began her writing and activism while in college and concentrated more on both passions as she moved to Chicago. She later moved again to Philadelphia to pursue a romantic interest, where she also was engaged in various community organizations and projects centered around the gay community.

She was published on many occasions in the Lavender Woman periodical, Sinister Wisdom, Conditions, and authored three poetry books: Portrait, 1974, In This Morning, 1979, and Lesbian Writer: Collected Work of Claudia Scott, 1981, which was published after her death by former romantic partner and close friend, Frances Hanckel. Many of her works draw inspiration from the challenges of being part of a fundamentalist Christian family with strong conservative views. She died by suicide in 1979, succumbing to carbon monoxide poisoning while sitting in a running car in an enclosed space. She was close with her youngest sibling, Scott O'Hara, gay pornographic performer and author. The poem For My Youngest Brother, is written by Claudia from his perspective and discusses his sexuality and criticisms of Christianity.

== Community activism ==
Scott participated in the lesbian-feminist literary communities in Chicago and Philadelphia during the 1970s. In Chicago, she worked on the newspaper Lavender Woman and presented workshops at a lesbian writers' conference.

After moving to Philadelphia in 1976, Scott volunteered at Giovanni's Room bookstore, the Lesbian Hotline and the Free Women's School. The Free Women's School offered workshops and training for women, where Scott taught a woodworking class.

== Writing ==
In a 1982 review of Lesbian Writer: Collected Work of Claudia Scott, poet Susan Wood-Thompson identified family relationships, lesbian identity, friendship and public life as recurring concerns in Scott's writing. She described the collection as including poems with autobiographical, narrative, dramatic and political emphases, alongside poems using natural imagery such as stones, waves and seasons. Wood-Thompson interpreted "Not Moving" as depicting a mother's refusal to accept her daughter's differing values, and discussed "All Post Cards Eagerly Accepted" in relation to maintaining friendship across distance.
