= Autocunnilingus =

Rare act of oral stimulation of one's own vulva

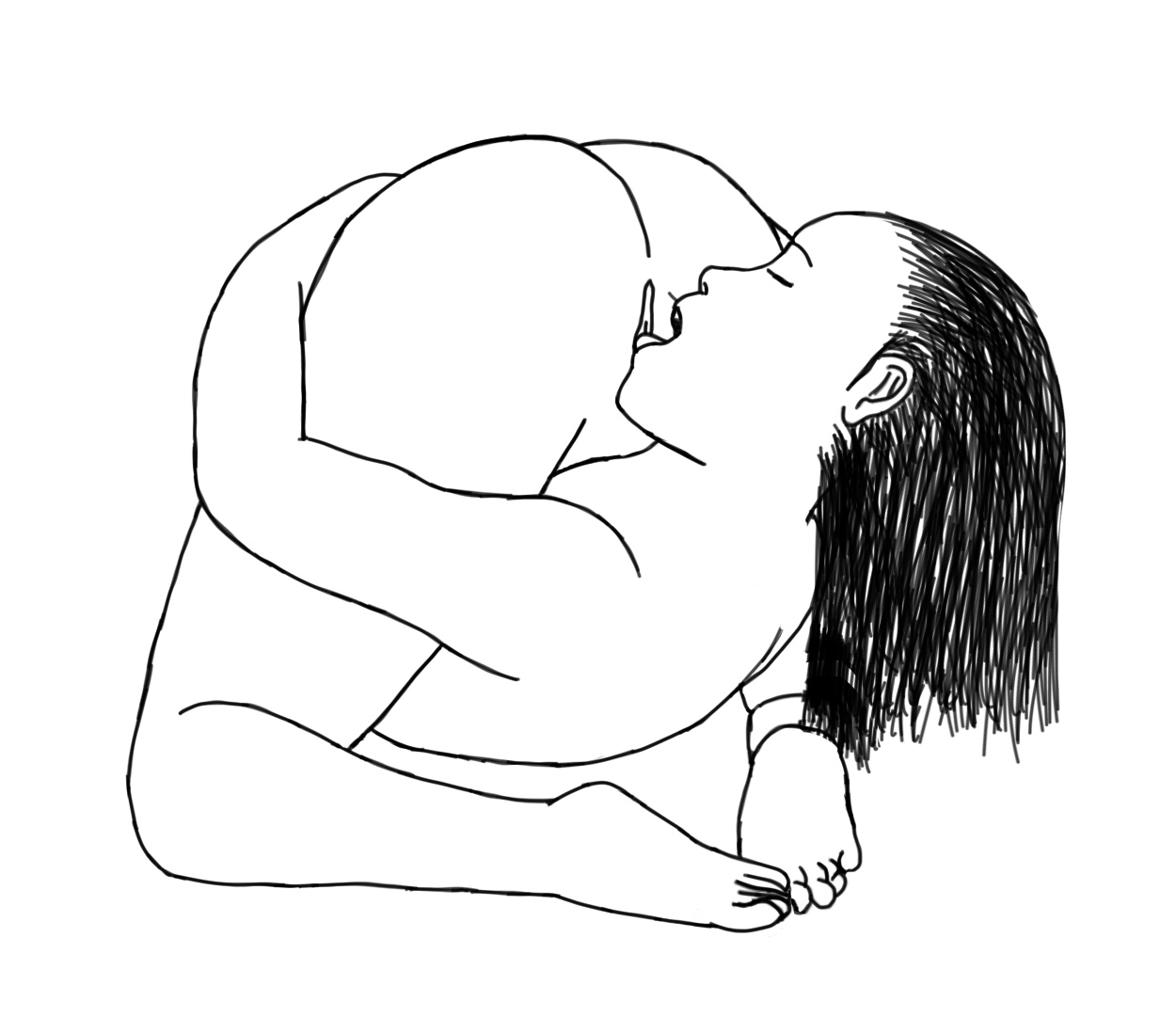
Artistic depiction of a woman performing autocunnilingus

Autocunnilingus is a form of masturbation involving the oral stimulation of one's own vulva. Performing cunnilingus on oneself requires an unusually high degree of flexibility such as that of contortionists or double-jointed people.

== Documentation ==
While possible for a small number of women, autocunnilingus has not been thoroughly studied or well-documented. It has, however, been reported as a self-destructive fantasy, and occurrences of the act have been reported in macaques and chimpanzees.

=== Fiction ===
In "Besorgung", one of his Venetian Epigrams, Goethe imagined Bettina becoming sufficiently limber to perform autocunnilingus and do without men. Camille Paglia compares the resulting image to William Blake's "engravings of solipsistically contorted figures".

== See also ==
- Autofellatio
- Sexercise
