= Sexual inhibition =

Constraint in sexual behavior

A sexual inhibition is a conscious or subconscious constraint or curtailment by a person of behavior relating to specific sexual matters or practices, a discussion of sexual matters or viewing certain sexual material. To some extent such inhibitions may arise from cultural and social influences and conditioning, as well as from personal factors, including sexual orientation. In most partner relationships, the level of inhibition tends to decrease the higher the level of trust that develops between the partners. Such inhibitions also tend to decrease with improvements in a person's confidence in their sexuality. A person may take a drug, such as alcohol, to reduce their level of inhibition.

Though a person can be regarded as being sexually inhibited if they irrationally fear or are excessively averse to any sexual practice or discourse, the term is normally not applied to a person who refrains from certain sexual activities on moral and rational grounds (such as desire to avoid pregnancy or contracting a disease) or due to a psychological disorder. A person may also refrain from sexual activity with a particular person by choice or because of a simple disliking of that particular activity or person, for whatever reason. The person whose advances are rejected may dismiss the rejection as being due to sexual inhibition.

On the other hand, a person may be regarded as having low sexual inhibitions when they welcome a variety of non-conventional erotic practices. Hypersexuality is typically associated with lowered sexual inhibitions, and alcohol and some drugs can affect a person's social and sexual inhibitions.

== Examples ==
Some inhibitions are expressed in terms of preferences for specific sexual practices and may be based on cultural attitudes. For example, cultural attitudes toward oral sex range from aversion to high regard. It has been considered taboo, or at least discouraged, in many cultures and parts of the world, especially with regard to fellatio. People give various reasons for their dislike of oral sex. Some state that since it does not result in reproduction, it is therefore unnatural. Others find it less intimate because it is not a face-to-face practice, or believe that it is a humiliating or unclean practice; that it is humiliating or unclean are opinions that are, in some cases, connected with the symbolism attached to different parts of the body.

Sexual inhibitions among female same-sex sexual relationships have also been studied. The belief that all women who have sex with women engage in oral sex (i.e., cunnilingus) is a misconception; some lesbian or bisexual women dislike cunnilingus due to not liking the experience or due to psychological or social factors, such as finding it unclean. Other lesbian or bisexual women believe that it is a necessity or largely defines lesbian sexual activity. Lesbian couples are more likely to consider a woman's dislike of cunnilingus as a problem than heterosexual couples are, and it is common for them to seek therapy to overcome inhibitions regarding it.

A female who cannot conceive by normal means and requires assistance to conceive may be constrained by social and sexual inhibitions and taboos from accepting a sperm donor or a friend to perform an intravaginal insemination, and the friend may be similarly inhibited; the friend may opt instead for the more expensive and arduous artificial insemination.

A fear of being nude in front of others can be regarded as a sexual inhibition. Some people feel uncomfortable being nude in front of another person, even in private with their sex partner. For example, a person may feel comfortable being nude only during a sexual activity, and then only with subdued lighting, or covered by a sheet or blanket. Some people decline medical examinations that involve disrobing. In an interview in March 2007, Halle Berry said that her toplessness in Swordfish (2001) was "gratuitous" to the movie, but that she needed to do the scene to get over her fear of nudity, and that it was the best thing she did for her career. Having overcome her inhibitions, she went on to a role in Monster's Ball, which included a nude scene. In 2002, Eva Green in her first film role needed director Bernardo Bertolucci's guidance during the filming of the nude and sex scenes in The Dreamers (2003), but was embarrassed when her family saw the film. Some actresses prefer not to expose their bodies to others and use a body double even for exposure of breasts.

== See also ==
- Asexuality
- Erotophobia
- Hypoactive sexual desire disorder or inhibited sexual desire
- Religion and sexuality
- Nature and nurture
- Social inhibition
- Sexual frustration
- Sexual repression
