= Scott O'Hara =

American poet

- Scott O'Hara, circa 1984
- Born: John Robert Scott; October 16, 1961; Grants Pass, Oregon, U.S.
- Died: February 18, 1998 (aged 36); San Francisco, California, U.S.
- Other name: Spunk

Scott O'Hara (October 16, 1961 – February 18, 1998) was an American pornographic performer, author, poet, editor and publisher. He rose to prominence during the mid-1980s for his work in such gay adult films as Winner Takes All, Below The Belt and In Your Wildest Dreams. O'Hara wrote four books: SeXplorers: The Guide to Doing It on the Road, Do It Yourself Piston Polishing (for Non-Mechanics), Autopornography: A Memoir of Life in the Lust Lane, and Rarely Pure and Never Simple: Selected Essays of Scott O'Hara, and edited and published the quarterly men's sex journal Steam and the cultural magazine Wilde.

== Acting career ==
O'Hara was born John Robert Scott on October 16, 1961, in Grants Pass, Oregon, one of seven children of Robert Hogue Scott and Martha Jane (née Farwell) Scott. While the family lived modestly on the family farm, there was inherited wealth, and for much of his life O'Hara was supported by a trust fund. He was known professionally as "Scott O'Hara" or "Spunk" and used his professional name throughout his adult life. In an essay titled "A Dick by Any Other Name", O'Hara wrote: "I knew from an early age that I was a changeling. I spent the next eighteen years looking for my real name, and since I found it I have not pretended to be anyone else."

O'Hara first came to prominence when he was awarded the title "The Man With The Biggest Dick in San Francisco" in a contest in the early 1980s. That title became his trademark for the rest of his porn and professional career. Published measurement of his penis varies from 9.5 to 11 inches. From 1983 to 1988, he appeared in over twenty gay and bisexual-themed adult films and videos, several of which demonstrate his rare ability of auto-fellatio. In addition to his work in adult films, O'Hara starred in Making Porn, a play by Ronnie Larsen based on conversations by Larsen with Scott O'Hara. He described his work in porn as "a sheer delight from the word go".

== Writing career ==
After he contracted HIV, offers to appear in porn ended. In 1991 he moved to Cazenovia, Wisconsin and started a new career as an author. With AIDS activist Darrell Keith Griffith (later noted for the website cruisingforsex.com), O'Hara started P.D.A. Press, sinking an alleged three-quarters of a million dollars of his own money into the venture. It went bankrupt in 1997. He edited and published from 1993 to 1995 the quarterly men's journal Steam, "the intellectual review of public sex", intended to facilitate cruising. According to its first issue, Steam focused on "public and semi-public sex. Our purpose is to provide a sex-positive forum for subjects considered taboo by other mags. We are aware that many activities mentioned in these pages are illegal in many parts of the world, and we do not advocate unlawful activity". In an advertisement in Volume 2, No. 1, he further stated that the publication was "all about sex – all kinds of sex, but especially public, publicly-disapproved, exciting sex". Articles often featured rest room, park, and other risky sexual encounters, and every issue contained tips on cruising spots (public places to meet men for sex), with notes on their safety or lack of same. It has been written: "Both men approached sex as if it were their last meal...O’Hara believed that life, gay life, should be more than mere biological survival."

Returning to San Francisco in 1995, he published five issues of the short-lived cultural magazine Wilde; he also contributed to a number of other publications. O'Hara wrote the four books mentioned above. As a playwright, he contributed to the musical, Ex-Lovers, which had a successful run at the Theatre Rhinoceros in San Francisco.

Upon his death, he left his personal papers (consisting of 39 boxes of journals, correspondence, notes, and manuscripts) to the John Hay Library of Brown University. The archives of the GLBT Historical Society in San Francisco preserve a collection of O'Hara's performance costumes and other memorabilia. The sibling to whom he had been closest was the lesbian activist and poet Claudia Ann Scott, who left him the poem For My Youngest Brother.

== Sexuality ==
O'Hara identified as gay. He said he was "obsessed with anything sexual" as young as eleven, and that his first sex with another man took place when he was fifteen, when he seduced, or perhaps raped (the word is his), a twenty-eight-year-old. He called monogamy "unnatural," and stated that "having our [gay men's] mouth full of dick has been a political statement like no other". He frequented gay bathhouses and other men's sex clubs, and much enjoyed sex in public parks. Until his HIV infection, he had "a different man every night, or nearly".

O'Hara was a proponent of barebacking, praising the freedom from fear of risk it gave him. This attracted criticism both during his life, and following his death. He called his HIV infection, which he believed he contracted in 1981, "an undeniable blessing", and "admired..tremendously" two people who "consciously made the decision to seroconvert" (to contract HIV; see bugchasing). He had "HIV+" tattooed on his bicep in 1994, then tore the sleeves off many of his shirts so it would be visible. Once he had progressed to AIDS, he talked about it "at every available opportunity". He wrote in detail about his treatment for lymphoma and the pain he endured.

O'Hara did not have, and did not want, a long-term relationship. He said that there were six times in his life when he was in love, deeply and thoroughly, for a period of a month or more. "The concept of 'Lover' (or 'Spouse', or 'Partner', or whatever) is basically, intrinsically antithetical to what my Philosophy of Life holds up as the ideal".

O'Hara acted in one bisexual film, but did not identify as bisexual. However, he listed Switch Hitters 2 as one of his favorite films, partly because he got to experience the novelty of sex with a woman, something he'd always wanted to do. He claimed to enjoy the scene and was proud of his butch appearance in the role, writing that "in all my years of ass-pounding, I'd never once gotten into a pussy, and I felt as if this were a serious gap in my sexual education, which needed filling."

Although not a pedophile or pederast, O'Hara was a supporter of NAMBLA due to, as he wrote, feeling not only affinity for them as a stigmatised group, but because having fantasised about sex with men as an adolescent, he saw them as the only gay support group prepared to acknowledge the existence of such reciprocal desires.

== Death ==
His trust fund exhausted, O'Hara spent his final years in a windowless San Francisco apartment he called "The Cave", surrounded by his record albums, CDs, books, and erotic art, and occupied his time gardening. He lived with HIV for more than 10 years and had developed non-Hodgkin lymphoma for almost five years. He dubbed his illness "The Death Spoor", and died of AIDS-related complications in San Francisco on February 18, 1998, at age 36. He donated his collection of over 500 works of erotic art to the Tom of Finland Foundation.

== Filmography ==
- Winner Takes All (1982)
- California Blue (1983)
- Ramcharger (1984)
- Slaves for Sale 2 (1984)
- The Joys of Self-Abuse (1985)
- The Other Side Of Aspen 2 (1985)
- Sgt. Swann's Private Files (1985)
- Sighs (1985)
- Advocate Men Live! 1 (1986)
- Below the Belt (1986)
- The Guy Next Door (1986)
- Hung and Horny (1986)
- Oversized Load (1986)
- Sex-Hunt (1986)
- Stick Shift (1986)
- In Your Wildest Dreams (1987)
- Switch Hitters 2 (1987)
- Advocate Men Live! 4 (1988)
- Double Standards (1988)
- Head Over Heels 1 (1988)
- New Recruits (1988)
- The Sex Party (1992)

== Publications ==
- "How I Got AIDS. Memoirs of a Working Boy", Diseased Pariah News, No. 3, 1991, p. 7; No. 4, 1991, pp. 7–8 (pictured on p. 2); No. 5, no date, p. 6; No. 6, 1992, p. 14; No. 7, 1992, p. 29; https://web.archive.org/web/20160624103522/http://www.diseasedpariahnews.com/, retrieved 10–29–2014.
- SeXplorers: The Guide to Doing It on the Road, San Francisco, PDA Press, 1995, ISBN 9780964548015.
- Do It Yourself Piston Polishing (for Non-Mechanics) (Badboy, 1996) ISBN 9781563334894.
- Autopornography: A Memoir of Life in the Lust Lane (New York: Haworth Press, 1997) ISBN 9780789001443.
- "Out on a Lymphoma", Poz, June 1998, https://www.poz.com/articles/228_1623.shtml, retrieved 10–28–2014.
- Rarely Pure and Never Simple: Selected Essays of Scott O'Hara (New York: Haworth Press, 1999), ISBN 9780789005731, containing: Do Be Fruitful, Won't You Dear? The Truth Is... A Dick by Any Other Name Making Porn: The Hangover Seeing Beauty Whaddya Like? Where There's a Wall, There's a Way GWM, 35, Horizontal, Versatile, Asleep Playing with My Mind Schloop, Spooge, Spunk: A Syntax of Sex Testament Call Me Irresponsible Better Than Sex Why Is a Beach? Ripe and Ready My Last Parasite Feeling a Little Queer Wholesome and Natural Ah, Unity Is That a Tumor on Your Tummy, or... ? The Opinionated Pervert Kilo-Mania Codeine Is God In Recovery Going Through a Phase Breaking the Rules Doubting Death Loving Life In a Former Life Rarely Pure Learning Lust Do It Yourself Candid Camera Through a Maze, Darkly Soaking In It Owning the Road Performed Consent Hot Nights in the Deep-Freeze: Porn in the Nineties In Love with My Work I Know It When I See It You May Already Be Dead ... and Never Simple Taking Photos Turned Off Slightly More Than Two Cents' Worth Gay Life Ends at 40 Billiard Ball An Acquired Taste Learning to Love the Bomb No, Really, I Mean It More Reasons Why I Don't Want a Lover Up in Lights Handcuffed Together Love and the Challenger Disaster Unlimited Sex Only.
- "Talking with My Mouth Full", in Policing public sex : queer politics and the future of AIDS activism, ed. Ephen Glenn Colter et al, Boston, South End Press, 1999, ISBN 089608549X, pp. 81–86. Limited preview available at https://www.amazon.com/Policing-Public-Sex-Politics-Activism/dp/089608549X/ref=sr_1_1?s=books&ie=UTF8&qid=1414505424&sr=1-1.

== See also ==
- List of male performers in gay porn films
