= Autoeroticism =

Sexual activity involving one person

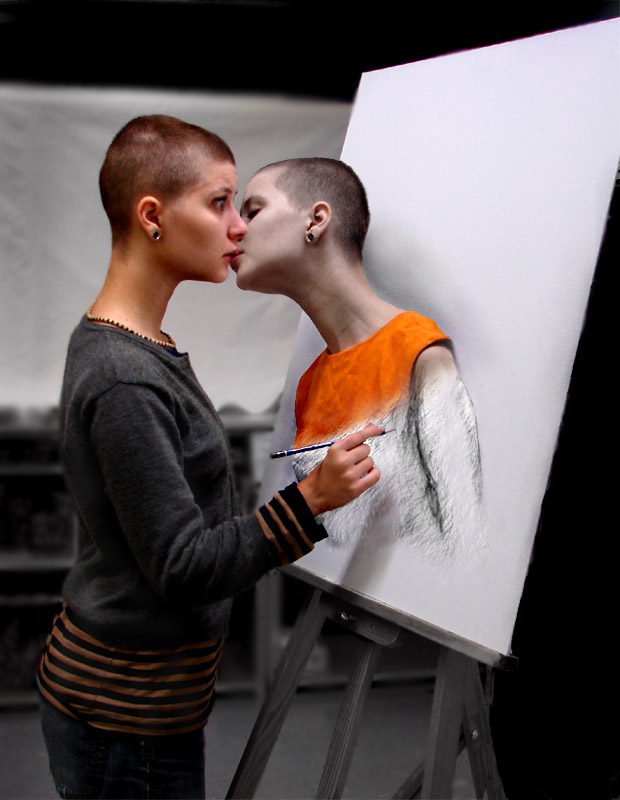
The Muse, autoeroticism in art, modeled by Nina Longshadow at Opus

Autoeroticism (also known as autoerotism or self-gratification) is sexual activity involving only one participant. It is the use of one's own body and mind to stimulate oneself sexually.

As an extension of masturbation, it usually means one of several activities done by oneself to fulfill their own sexual desire. Masturbation has a similar meaning, but is not synonymous; masturbation is only physical stimulation of the genitals by oneself while autoeroticism encompasses all stimulation by oneself (masturbation or sexual thoughts), as well as involuntary experiences (wet dreams or spontaneous sexual arousal).

The term was popularized toward the end of the 19th century by British sexologist Havelock Ellis, who defined autoeroticism as "the phenomenon of spontaneous sexual emotion generated in the absence of an external stimulus proceeding, directly or indirectly, from another person".

Autosexuality, a sexuality about primarily attraction to oneself, is usually accompanied by autoerotic activities such as masturbation or sexually fantasizing about oneself.

The mere act of autoeroticism does not mean a person is autosexual. For example, masturbation is done nearly universally, regardless of someone's gender or sexuality. It can be directed at oneself, but can also be used to sleep, relieve stress, or release sexual tension when a partner is either unavailable or does not consent to sex. However, masturbation or other autoerotic practices might be a factor in deciding one's sexuality.

== Terminology and concept ==
As previously stated, the term autoeroticism is a physical or emotional act done to satisfy one's own sexual desires ("self-gratification"). Although masturbation is the most common autoerotic action, and is sometimes used as a synonym for autoeroticism, it is not the only autoerotic activity. The term autoeroticism usually includes masturbation, sexual fantasy, and sexual emotions arising without external cause, which are all maintained by the self.

Autosexuality, on the other hand, is a sexual orientation towards oneself, and is closely related, albeit not identical, to autoeroticism. An autosexual person may engage in masturbation, possibly while looking in a mirror.

In 1977, a scientist named Myra T. Johnson authored a paper titled Asexual and Autoerotic Women: Two Invisible Groups, contrasting the notions of autosexuality and asexuality:

"The asexual woman ... has no sexual desires at all [but] the autoerotic woman ... recognizes such desires but prefers to satisfy them alone." Johnson's evidence is mostly letters to the editor found in women's magazines written by autoerotic/asexual women. She portrays them as invisible, "oppressed by a consensus that they are nonexistent," and left behind by both the sexual revolution and the feminist movement. Society either ignores or denies their existence or insists they must be ascetic for religious reasons, neurotic, or asexual for political reasons.

== Self-stimulation ==
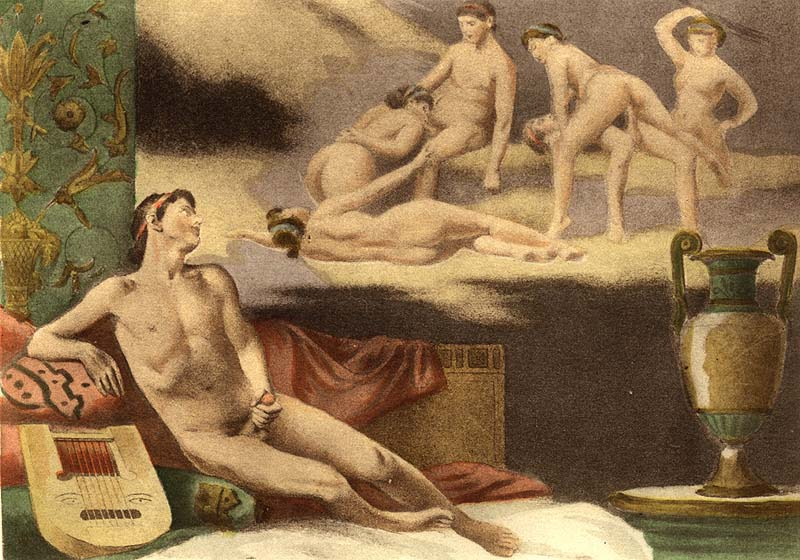
Depiction of a man masturbating while fantasizing by Édouard-Henri Avril

Masturbation is the most popular autoerotic practice. There are many techniques used to masturbate, like manual stimulation or using everyday objects.

For some people, sex toys such as dildos, vibrators, masturbators, anal beads and Sybian machines can be helpful for this form of autoeroticism. Stimulation with the mouth is significantly harder to achieve; proof of autocunnilingus is incredibly slim but autofellatio is thought to occur in less than 1% of the male population, possibly because of the physical flexibility required to perform it.

Another activity is sexual fantasy, which is imagining a sexual experience while one is awake. Because it does not involve any stimulation other than a person's mind, it is an autoerotic activity. It can be used to envision sex that might not be possible due to legal (e.g. one's age), religious (e.g. religions where premarital sex is not allowed), or natural reasons (e.g. sex with a mythical creature or other things that can be impossible in the real world.) Depending on age or gender, these fantasies may be more or less explicit.

Sexual fantasy may also be done during masturbation, which could enhance said activity without the downsides of pornography or other media, although it might be less stimulating and more difficult to accomplish.

== Criticism and controversies ==
Some people, for religious or personal reasons, disapprove of autoeroticism on moral grounds. For example, masturbation is considered a sin by the Roman Catholic Church. Teaching adolescents about masturbation remains controversial in some parts of the world. For example, in the United States in 1994, President Bill Clinton fired Surgeon General Joycelyn Elders in part because she advocated teaching about masturbation in schools as a way of preventing teenage pregnancy and sexually transmitted infections.

== Safety ==
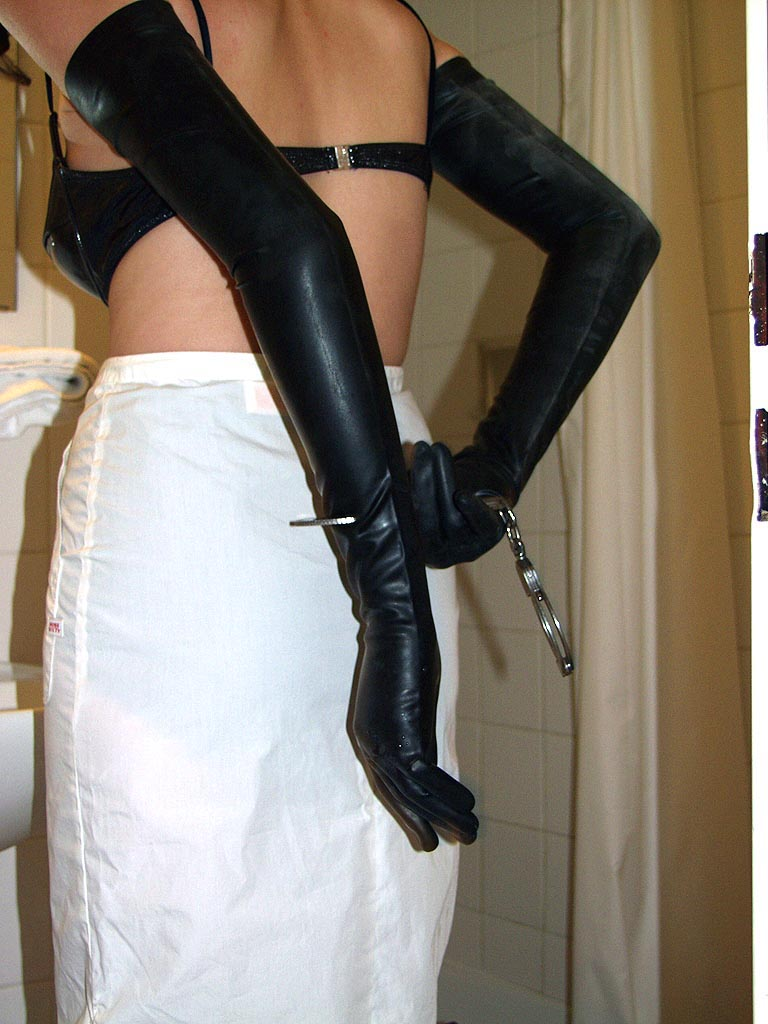
Self-bondage is a potentially risky autoerotic practice

A few autoerotic practices are considered unsafe, and sometimes even lead to death. These include autoerotic asphyxiation and self-bondage. The potential for injury or even death that exists while engaging in these practices rather than the partnered versions (erotic asphyxiation and bondage, respectively) becomes drastically increased due to the isolation and lack of assistance in the event of a problem.

== In other animal species ==
Autoerotic behavior has been observed in many species, both in the wild and in captivity. Individuals of some species, such as apes and dolphins, have been known to create tools for autoerotic purposes.

== Increase of autoeroticism during COVID-19 pandemic ==
Following the outbreak of the COVID-19 pandemic and the subsequent worldwide lockdown, there was an increase in autoerotic sexual practices of 40% according to a study done by the International Journal of Impotence Research.

== Sources ==
- "Autoeroticism". APA Dictionary of Psychology. American Psychological Association. n.d.
