= Cunnilingus =

Oral sex on the vulva by a sexual partner

A man performing cunnilingus on his female partner

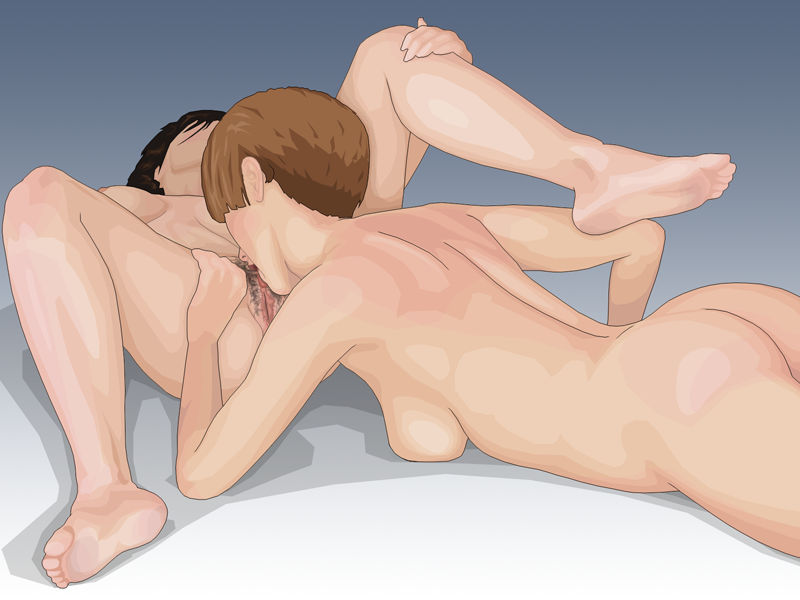
A woman performing cunnilingus on her female partner

Cunnilingus is an oral sex act consisting of the stimulation of a vulva by using the tongue and lips. The clitoris is the most sexually sensitive part of the vulva, and its stimulation may result in a woman becoming sexually aroused or achieving orgasm.

Cunnilingus can be sexually arousing for participants and may be performed by a sexual partner as foreplay to incite sexual arousal before other sexual activities (such as vaginal or anal intercourse) or as an erotic and physically intimate act on its own. Cunnilingus can be a risk for contracting sexually transmitted infections (STIs), but the transmission risk from oral sex, especially of HIV, is significantly lower than for vaginal or anal sex.

Oral sex is often regarded as taboo, but most countries do not have laws which ban the practice. Commonly, heterosexual couples do not regard cunnilingus as affecting the virginity of either partner, while lesbian couples commonly do regard it as a form of virginity loss. People may also have negative feelings or sexual inhibitions about giving or receiving cunnilingus or may refuse to engage in it.

== Etymology and terminology ==
The term cunnilingus is derived from the Latin words for vulva (cunnus) and the verb "to lick" (lingere). There are numerous slang terms for cunnilingus, including "drinking from the furry cup", "carpet munching", and "muff-diving". Additional common slang terms used are "giving lip", "lip service", or "tipping the velvet"; this last is an expression that novelist Sarah Waters claims to have "plucked from the relative obscurity of Victorian porn". It is also popularly known in the urban community as "dining at the Y" or "DATY". A person who performs cunnilingus may be referred to as a "cunnilinguist". It is also referred to by more ambiguous terminology nonspecific to the form of oral sex performed (e.g., "getting or giving head" or "going down" on someone).

== Practice ==
Female genital area with labels

=== General ===
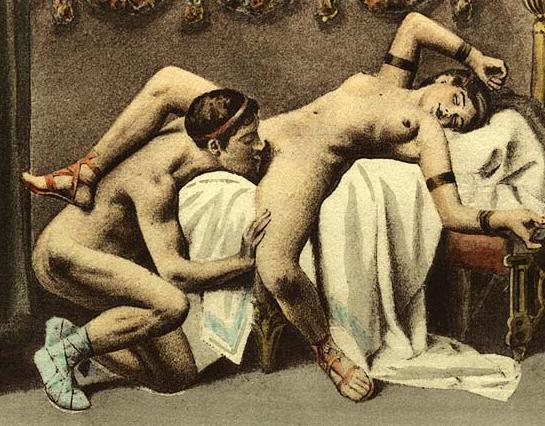
Édouard-Henri Avril's depiction of cunnilingus

General statistics indicate that 70–80% of women require clitoral stimulation to achieve orgasm. Shere Hite's research on human female sexuality reports that, for most women, orgasm is easily achieved by cunnilingus because of the direct stimulation of the clitoral glans and shaft (including stimulation to other external parts of the vulva that are physically related to the clitoris) that may be involved during the act.

The essential aspect of cunnilingus is oral stimulation of the vulva by licking with the tongue, use of the lips, or some combination. The nose, chin, and teeth might be used as well. During the activity, the performer may use fingers to open the labia majora (the vulva's outer lips) to enable the tongue to better stimulate the clitoris, or the female may separate the labia herself for her partner. Separating the legs wide would also usually open the vulva sufficiently for the partner to orally reach the clitoris.

The performer may also stimulate the labia minora (inner lips of the vulva) by using the lips or tongue. Movements can be slow or fast, regular or erratic, firm or soft, according to the participants' preferences. The tongue can be inserted into the vagina, either stiffened or moving. The performing partner may also hum to produce vibration.

Women may consider personal hygiene before practicing oral sex important, as poor hygiene can lead to odors, accumulation of sweat and micro-residue (such as lint, urine or menstrual blood), which the giving partner may find unpleasant.

Autocunnilingus, which is cunnilingus performed by oneself on oneself as masturbation, may be possible, but an unusually high degree of flexibility is required, which may be possessed only by contortionists.

=== During menstruation ===
Cunnilingus may be performed on a menstruating partner, which is called "to earn one's red wings" in slang. The phrase is a reference to menstrual blood stains in the shape of a small bird's wings that are liable to form on the giving partner's cheeks during the act.

The red wing patch was common among the Hells Angels by the mid-1960s, and the slang term continued to be known among biker gangs in the 1980s. Gershon Legman saw the act/badge not only as functioning a homosocial tie, but also as reflecting a deep and primitive belief in the lifegiving powers of blood.

The elder Mirabeau, in his Erotika Biblion of 1783, saw cunnilingus during menstruation as an extreme act, linked with the submissive worship of the Mother goddess, and by extension to the Black Mass.

=== Prevalence ===
In a Canadian study, 89% of heterosexual and bisexual men had practiced cunnilingus. Of those who had practiced it, 94% enjoyed it, and 76% practiced it often or very often. Reasons for not practicing cunnilingus included lack of opportunity (73%) and disgust (13%).

== Health aspects ==
=== Sexually transmitted infections ===
Chlamydia, human papillomavirus (HPV), gonorrhea, syphilis, herpes, hepatitis (multiple strains), and other sexually transmitted infections (STIs) can be transmitted through oral sex. Any sexual exchange of bodily fluids with a person infected with HIV, the virus that causes AIDS, poses a risk of infection. Risk of STI infection, however, is generally considered significantly lower for oral sex than for vaginal or anal sex, with HIV transmission considered the lowest risk with regard to oral sex. Furthermore, the documented risk of HIV transmission through cunnilingus is lower than that associated with fellatio, vaginal or anal intercourse.

There is an increased risk of STI if the receiving partner has wounds on her vulva, or if the giving partner has wounds or open sores on or in their mouth, or bleeding gums. Brushing the teeth, flossing, or undergoing dental work soon before or after performing cunnilingus can also increase the risk of transmission, because all of these activities can cause small scratches in the lining of the mouth. These wounds, even when they are microscopic, increase the chances of contracting STIs that can be transmitted orally under these conditions. Such contact can also lead to more mundane infections from common bacteria and viruses found in, around and secreted from the genital regions. Because of the aforementioned factors, medical sources advise the use of effective barrier methods when performing or receiving cunnilingus with a partner whose STI status is unknown.

Cunnilingus during menstruation is considered high risk for the partner performing cunnilingus because there may be a high concentration of virus in menstrual blood, such as hepatitis B.

=== HPV and oral cancer ===
Links have been reported between oral sex and oral cancer with human papillomavirus (HPV)-infected people.

A 2007 study found a correlation between oral sex and throat cancer. It is believed that this is due to the transmission of HPV, a virus that has been implicated in the majority of cervical cancers and which has been detected in throat cancer tissue in numerous studies. The study concludes that people who had one to five oral sex partners in their lifetime had approximately a doubled risk of throat cancer compared with those who never engaged in this activity, and those with more than five oral sex partners had a 250 percent increased risk.

=== Mechanical trauma to the tongue ===
The lingual frenulum (underside of the tongue) is vulnerable to ulceration by repeated friction during sexual activity ("cunnilingus tongue"). Ulceration of the lingual frenulum caused by cunnilingus is horizontal, the lesion corresponding to the contact of the under surface of the tongue with the edges of the lower front teeth when the tongue is in its most forward position. This type of lesion resolves in 7–10 days, but may recur with repeated performances. Chronic ulceration at this site can cause linear fibrous hyperplasia. The incisal edges of the mandibular teeth can be smoothed to minimize the chance of trauma.

== Cultural and religious views ==
=== General views ===
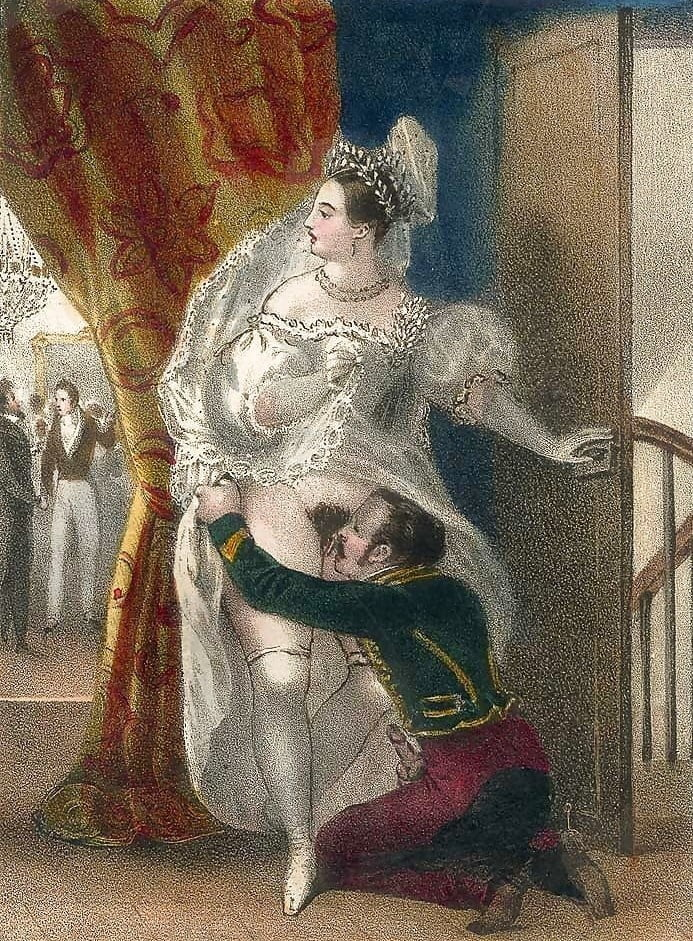
A man performing cunnilingus on a woman at a formal party, depicted by French artist Achille Devéria

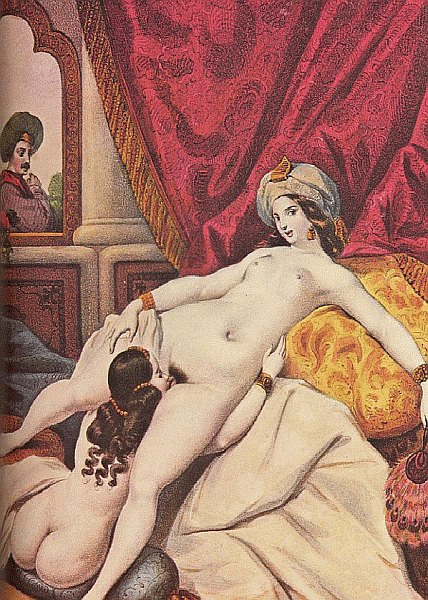
An Orientalist depiction of cunnilingus by Achille Devéria

Cultural views on giving or receiving cunnilingus range from aversion to high regard. It has been considered taboo, or discouraged, in many cultures and parts of the world. In Taoism, cunnilingus is revered as a spiritually fulfilling practice that is believed to enhance longevity. In modern Western culture, oral sex is widely practiced among adolescents and adults. Laws of some jurisdictions regard cunnilingus as penetrative sex for the purposes of sexual offenses with regard to the act, but most countries do not have laws which ban the practice, in contrast to anal sex or extramarital sex.

People give various reasons for their dislike or reluctance to perform cunnilingus, or having cunnilingus performed on them. Some cultures attach symbolism to different parts of the body, leading some people to believe that cunnilingus is ritually unclean or humiliating.

While commonly believed that lesbian sexual practices involve cunnilingus for all women who have sex with women, some lesbian or bisexual women dislike cunnilingus due to not liking the experience or due to psychological or social factors, such as regarding it as unclean. Other lesbian or bisexual women believe that it is a necessity or largely defines lesbian sexual activity. Lesbian couples are more likely to consider a woman's dislike of cunnilingus as a problem than heterosexual couples are, and it is common for them to seek therapy to overcome inhibitions regarding it.

Oral sex is also commonly used as a means of preserving virginity, especially among heterosexual pairings; this is sometimes termed technical virginity (which additionally includes anal sex, manual sex and other non-penetrative sex acts, but excludes penile-vaginal sex). The concept of technical virginity or sexual abstinence through oral sex is particularly popular among teenagers. By contrast, lesbian pairings commonly consider oral sex or fingering as resulting in virginity loss, though definitions of virginity loss vary among lesbians as well.

=== In Pornography ===
One large scale study of pornographic videos noted that when male performers engaged in cunnilingus for a longer period of time, they had higher volumes of ejaculate, an increase in sexual arousal resulting from exposure to the vaginal secretion 'copulins' during cunnilingus is reasoned to be the cause.

=== Taoism ===
Cunnilingus is accorded a revered place in Taoism. This is because the practice was believed to achieve longevity, by preventing the loss of semen, whose loss is believed to bring about a corresponding loss of vitality. Conversely, by either semen retention or ingesting the secretions from the vagina, a person can conserve and increase their qi, or original vital breath.

According to Philip Rawson, these half-poetic, half-medicinal metaphors explain the popularity of cunnilingus among people: "The practice was an excellent method of imbibing the precious feminine fluid". However, these notions entail a lack of actual interest in pleasing the female partner and an effort to benefit at her expense, which has led sinologist Kristofer Schipper to denounce the ancient handbooks on the "Art of the Bedroom" as embracing a "kind of glorified male vampirism" that is not truly Taoist at all.

== In art ==
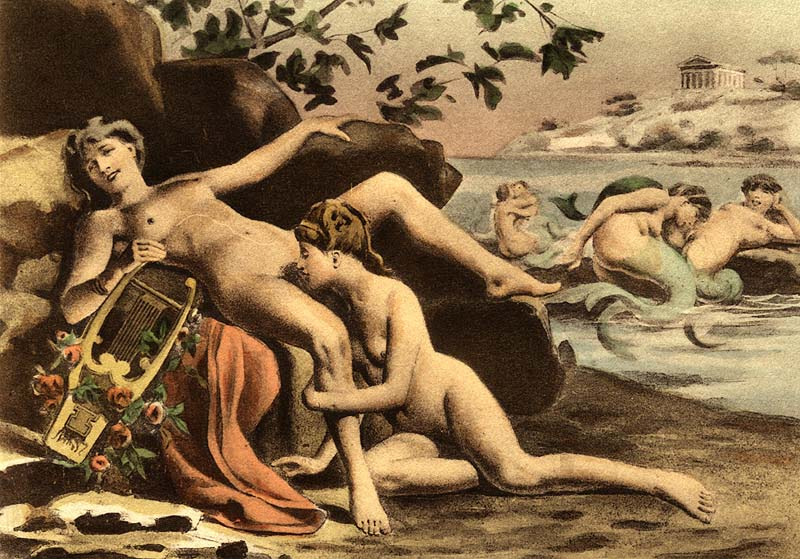
Sappho having sex with her lover (girlfriend) on the beaches of Lesbos, as mermaids play in the background, by Édouard-Henri Avril.

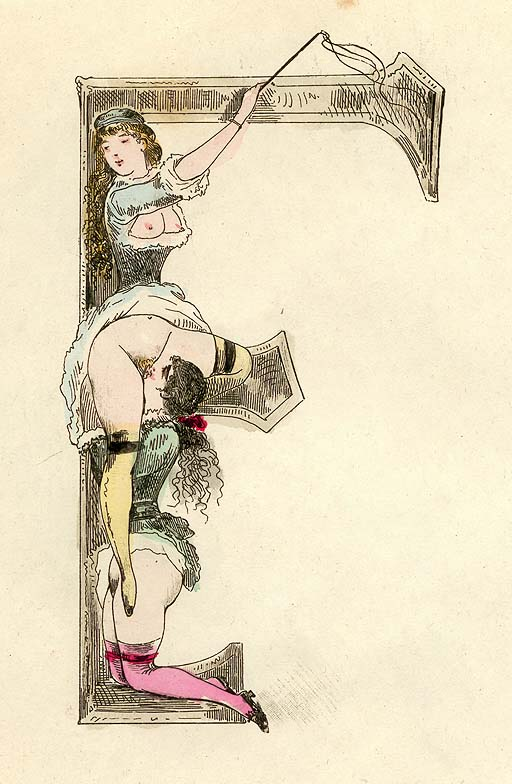
Letter from an erotic alphabet by Joseph Apoux (1846-1910) published ca. 1880.

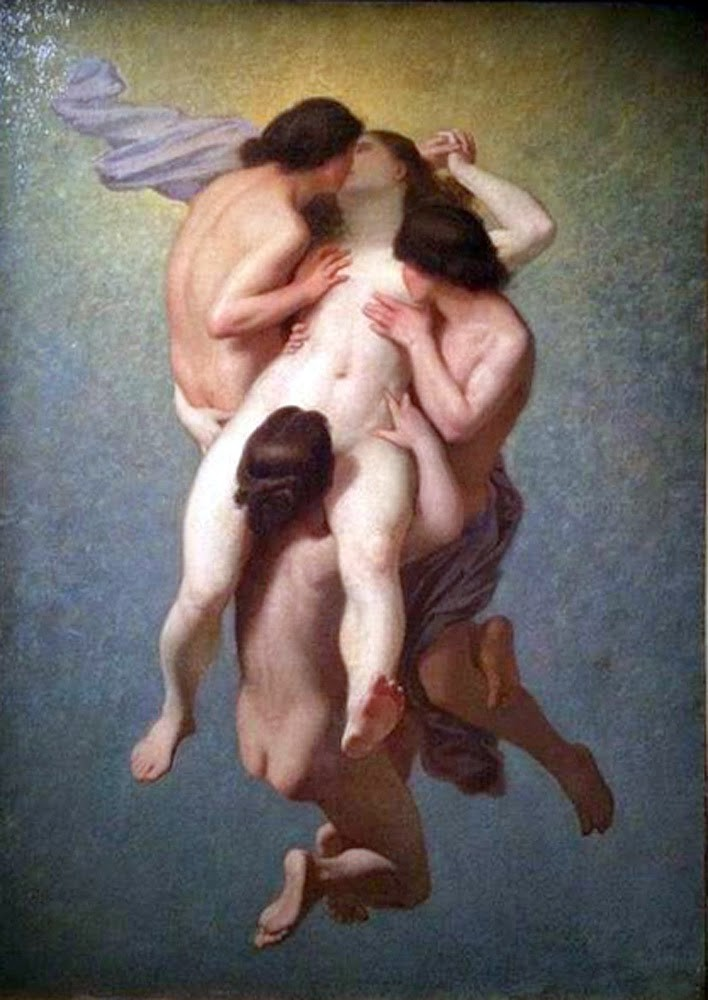
Nicolas-Francois-Octave Tassaert, La femme damnée, 1859

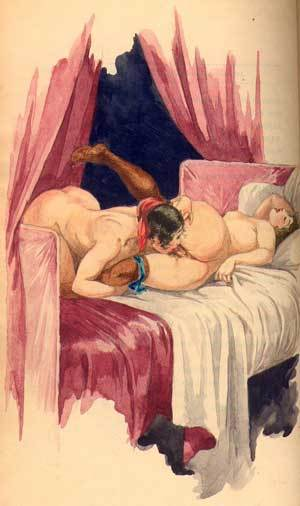
Drawing by Martin van Maele

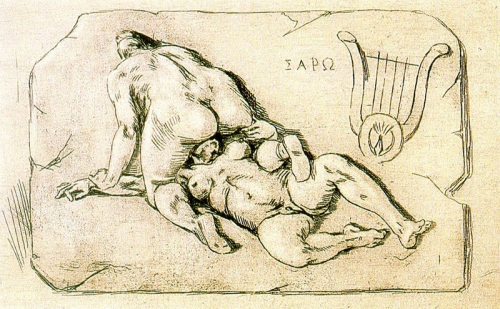
Félicien Rops. Lesbos, Known as Sappho, circa 1890

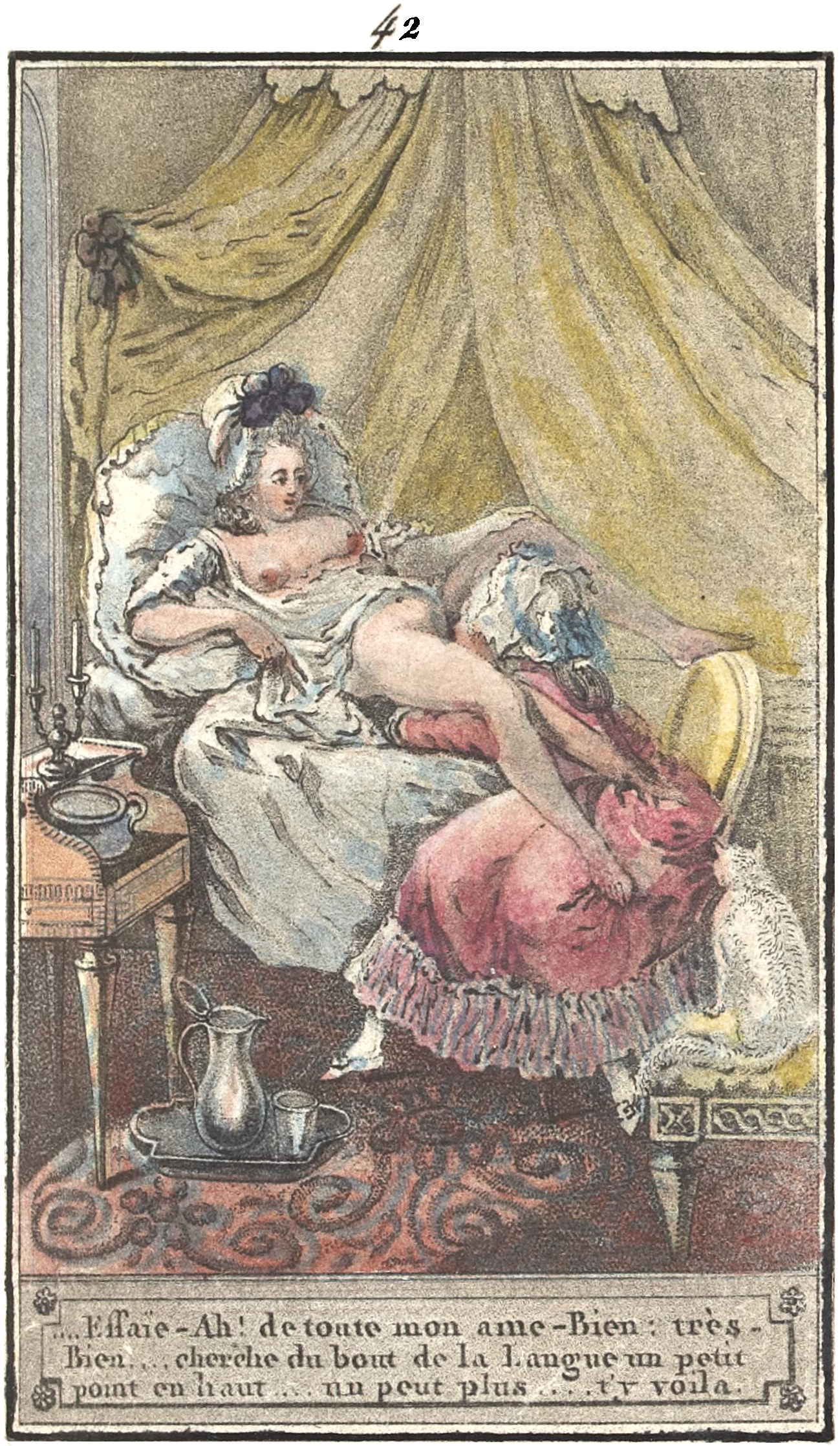
Illustration for La Matinée libertine, ou les Moments bien employés, an erotic and libertine novel, 1787

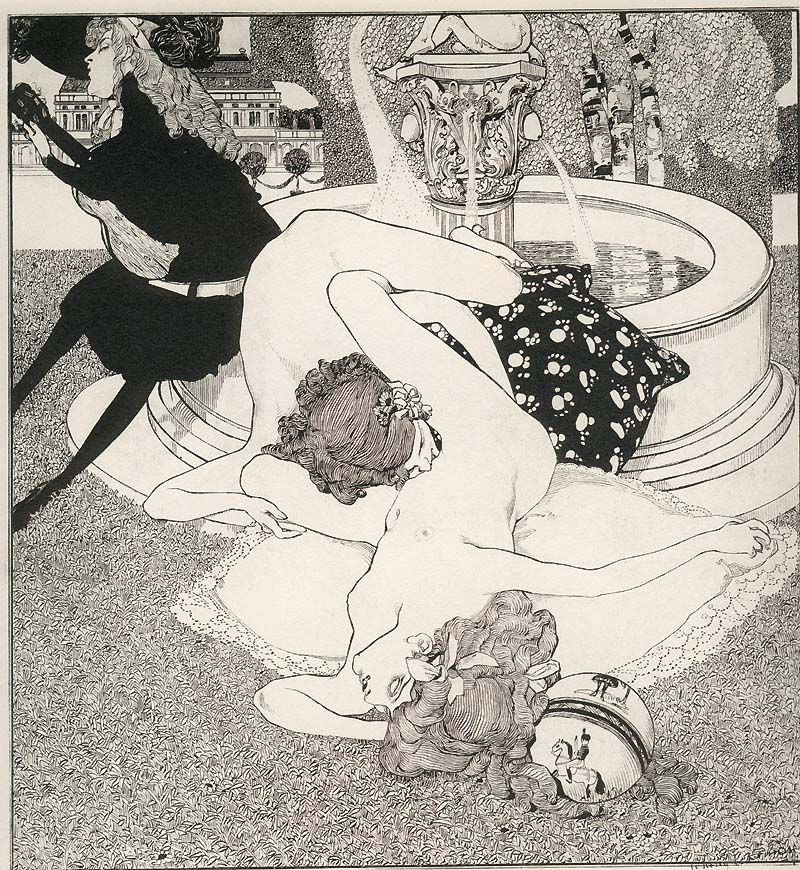
Erotic drawing by Franz von Bayros

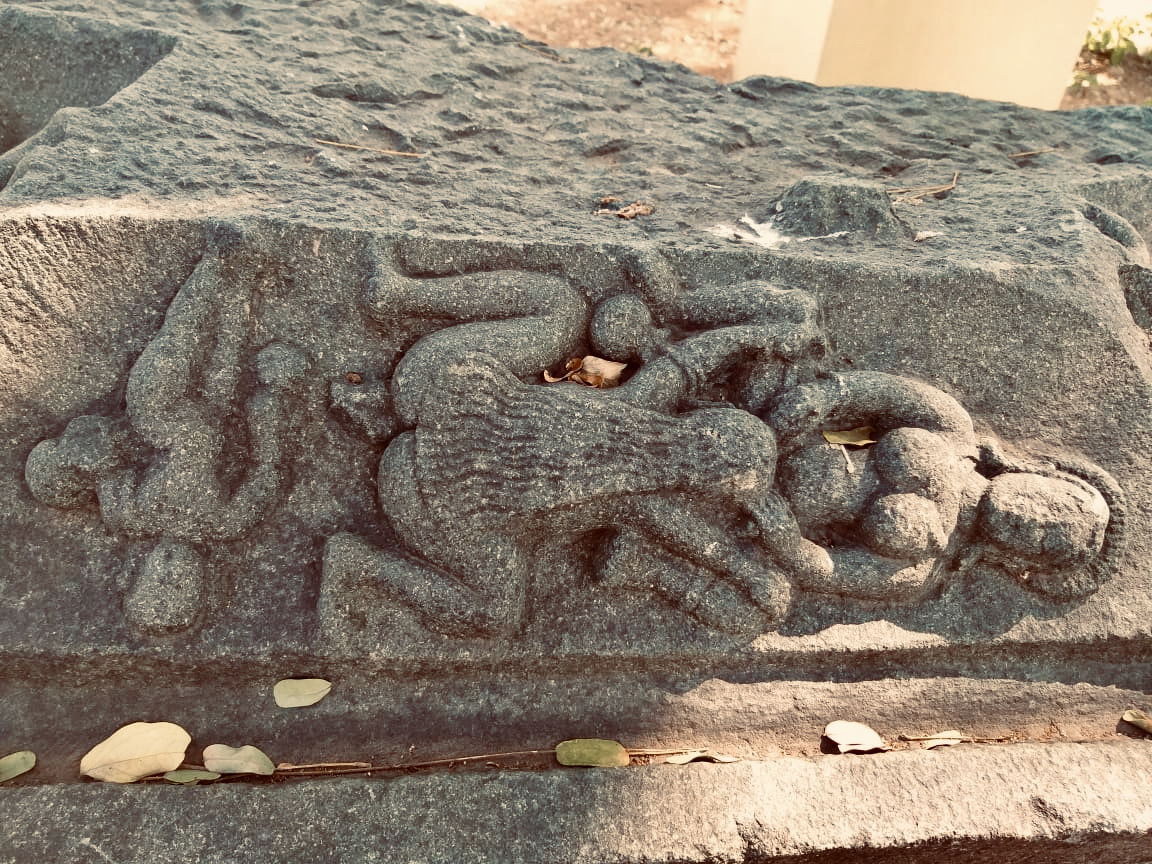
Regional ruins discovered and preserved in or near Panagal, Telangana, India

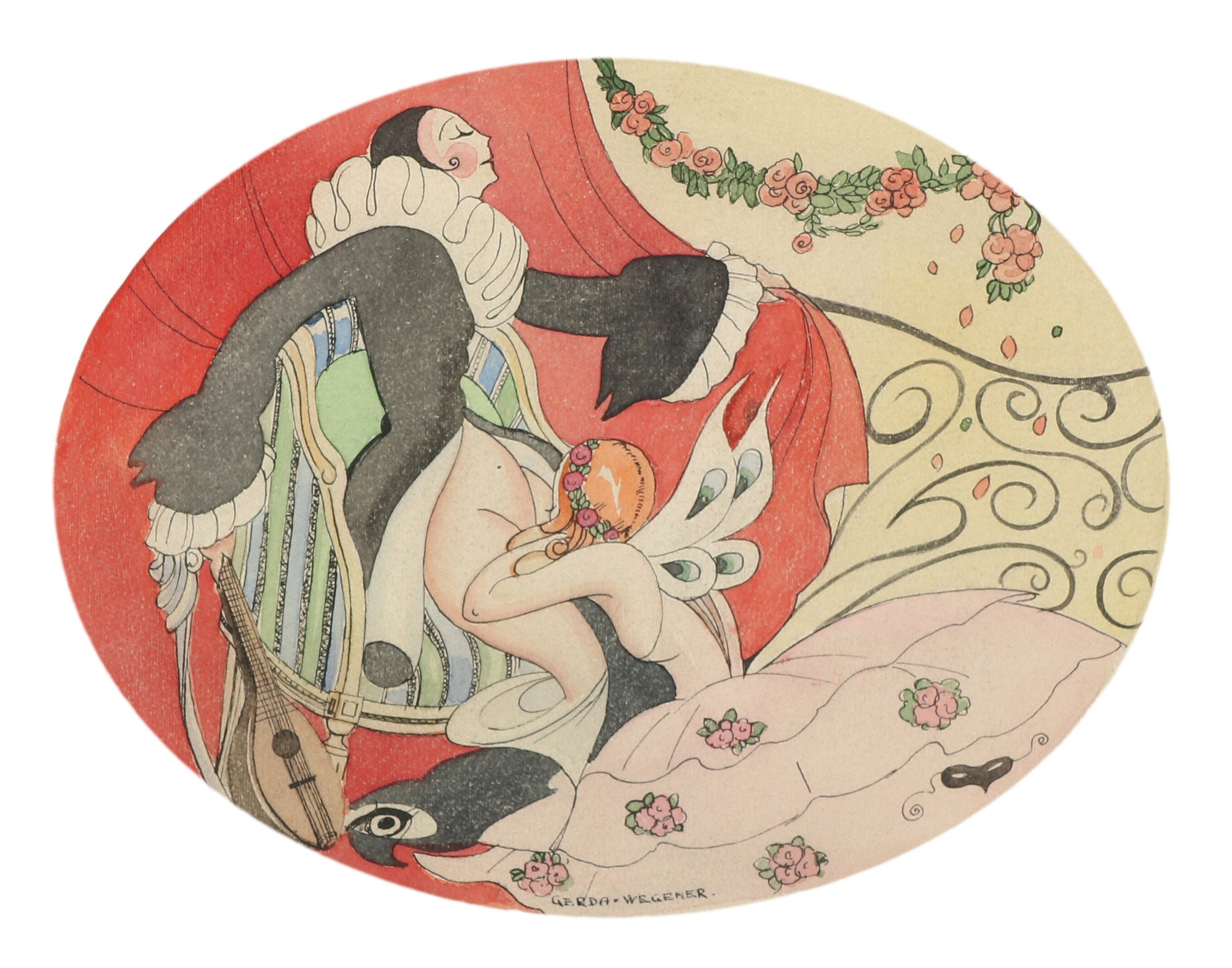
From the series of watercolors, which appeared in 1925 under the title "Les Délassements d'Eros" in Erotopolis (Paris), by Gerda Wegener

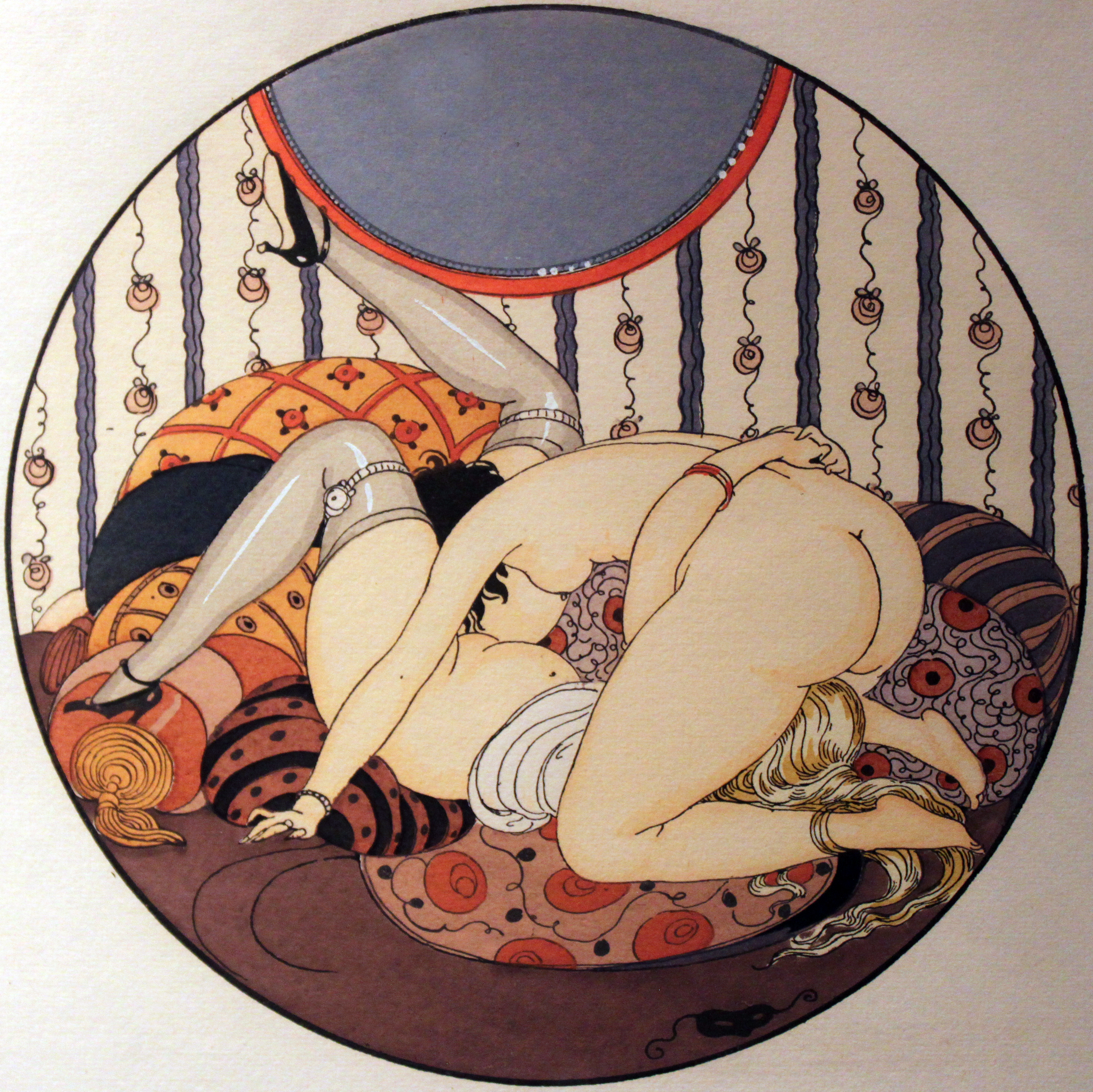
From the series of watercolors, which appeared in 1925 under the title "Les Délassements d'Eros" in Erotopolis (Paris), by Gerda Wegener

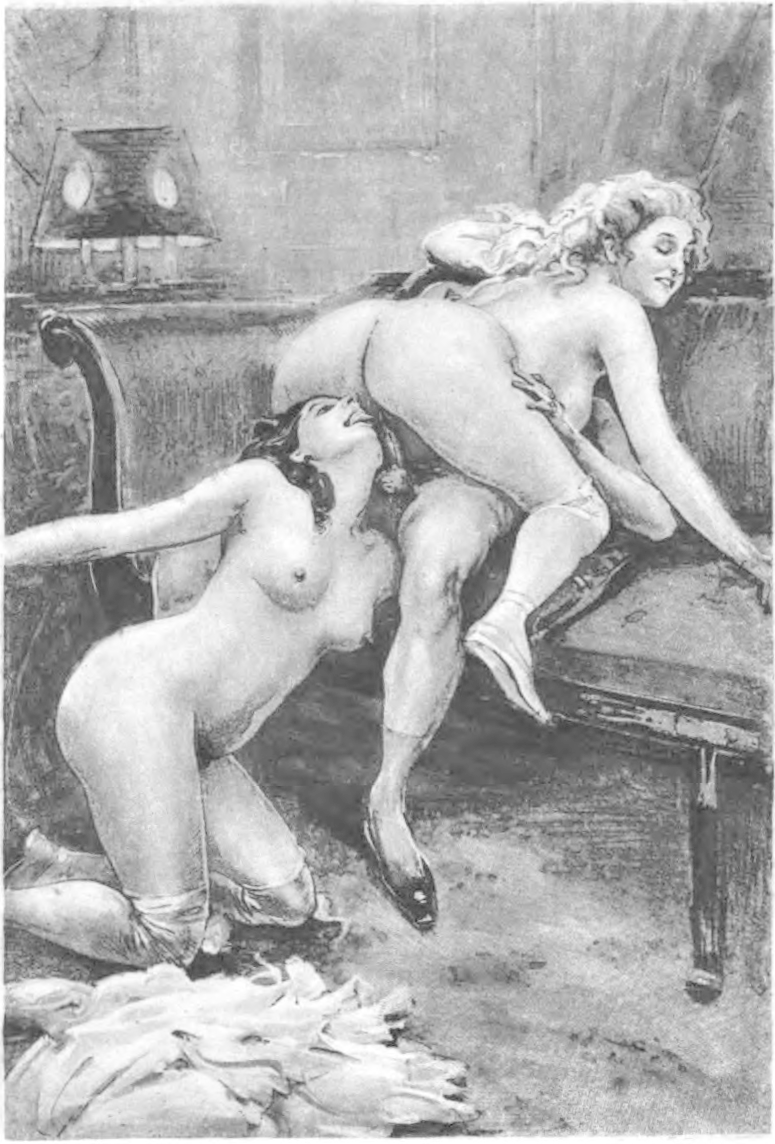
An illustration from the book Gamiani.

== See also ==
- Anilingus – Oral stimulation of the anus
- Facesitting – Sexual activity
- Fellatio – Oral stimulation of the penis
- Fingering – Use of fingers to sexually stimulate
