= Social inhibition =

Deliberate avoidance of social interaction

Social inhibition is the conscious or subconscious avoidance of a situation or social interaction. With a high level of social inhibition, situations are avoided because of the possibility of others disapproving of their feelings or actions. Related processes that deal with social inhibition are social evaluation concerns, anxiety in social interaction, social avoidance, and withdrawal. Also related are components such as cognitive patterns, anxious apprehension during social interactions, and internalizing problems. It also describes those who suppress anger, restrict social behavior, withdraw in the face of novelty, and have a long latency to interact with strangers.

Individuals can also have a low level of social inhibition, but certain situations may or may not generally cause people to be more or less inhibited. Social inhibition can sometimes be reduced by the short-term use of drugs including alcohol or benzodiazepines. However, this does not solve the root issue and may cause substance dependence. Major signs of social inhibition in children include cessation of play, hesitancy to approach an unfamiliar person, signs of fear and negative affect, and security seeking. In high level cases of social inhibition, other social disorders can emerge through development, such as social anxiety disorder and social phobia.

== Background ==
Social inhibition can range from normal reactions to social situations to a pathological level, associated with psychological disorders like social anxiety or social phobia. Life events are important and are related to the well-being and inhibition levels of a person. In a laboratory study conducted by Buck and colleagues, social inhibition in everyday life was reviewed. Researchers observed how individuals interacted and communicated about different stimuli. In this study, there were female participants referred to as "senders", who viewed twelve emotionally loaded stimuli. There were also participants in the study referred to as "received", who had to guess which stimuli had been viewed by the senders. The senders were either alone, with a friend, or with a stranger while viewing the slides. The results of the study revealed that being with a stranger had inhibitory effects on communication, whereas being with a friend had facilitative effects with some stimuli and inhibitory effects with others. The results show how anyone can be inhibited in daily life, with strangers or even friends. Inhibition can also be determined by one's sensitivity levels to different social cues throughout the day. Gable and colleagues conducted a study in which they examined different events participants would record at the end of their day. Participants were also measured on the behavioral activation system and the behavioral inhibition system. The results revealed that individuals with more sensitivity on the behavioral inhibition system reported having more negative effects from daily events.

Expression can also be inhibited or suppressed because of anxiety to social situations or simple display rules. Yarczower and Daruns' study on social inhibition of expression defined inhibition of expression as a suppression of one's facial behavior in the presence of someone or a perceived anxious situation. They addressed the display rules commonly learned by a person during childhood; we are told what expressions are suitable for what situations, and as age increases, we are socialized into expressing weaker facial emotions. However, leaving the face with a reduced expression hinders communication, in turn making the face a less reliable social cue during social interactions. Friedmen and Miller-Herringer bring these nonverbal expressions to light by studying individuals that have a greater level of emotional suppression. They state that without proper emotional expression, social interactions can become far more difficult because others may not understand another individual's emotional state.

In addition, there are also four commonly seen irrational cognitive patterns involved in social inhibition:

1. The first pattern centers on self-esteem and perfectionism. In these cases, an individual inhibits themselves through self-criticism; they want to do everything the "right" way.
2. The second pattern deals with unrealistic approval needs; here, individuals want to gain the approval of others and will fear rejection if they express too much.
3. In the third pattern, unrealistic labeling of aggressive and assertive behavior depicts how many individuals that inhibit themselves may feel as though aggression or assertiveness is bad. They believe that if they express these behaviors, they will receive a negative label.
4. Similarly to the first pattern, the final pattern discusses criticism of others. Here, individuals will be highly critical of others, much like they are to themselves. Shyness is another factor that is a part of social inhibition; shyness is associated with low emotional regulations and high negative emotions. In many cases, shy individuals have a greater change of social inhibition.

== Over the lifespan ==
Social inhibition can develop over a lifespan. Children can be withdrawn, adolescents can have anxiety to social situations, and adults may have a hard time adjusting to social situations which they have to initiate on their own. Inhibitions can change and be different for many. In many cases, inhibition can lead to other social disorders and phobias.

=== Infants and children ===
In infants and children, social inhibition is characterized by a temperamental style that results in negative responses and the withdrawal from unfamiliar people, situations and objects. In addition to cessation of play, inhibited infants and children may display long latencies to approaching unfamiliar individuals, signs of fear, negative affect, and security seeking. Avoidant behavior can be observed at a very young age. In one study, Fox and colleagues found that even at four months of age, some infants had negative responses to unfamiliar visual and audio stimuli. The study was longitudinal; therefore, follow ups revealed that half of the infants who had seen to have high negative responses continued to show behavioral inhibition through the age of two. Fox's study reported that the expression of behavioral inhibition showed a small degree of continuity. Over time, the toddlers who were quiet and restrained continued the trend into childhood, being cautious, quiet, and socially withdrawn. The uninhibited control group of the same ages continued to interact easily with unfamiliar people and situations. There has also been an observable link between inhibition at childhood age with social disorders in adolescents and adulthood. Schwartz and Kagan found that in a longitudinal study from ages two to thirteen, sixty-one percent of teens who had exhibited inhibitor traits as toddlers reported social anxiety symptoms as adolescents, compared to the twenty-seven percent of adolescents who were uninhibited in earlier life. Despite this, not every child that has exhibited withdrawn or inhibited behavior will be inhibited into adolescence or will manifest a social disorder.

The caregiver is not solely responsible for inhibition in children, however in some cases it can be a factor. Caregivers can affect the inhibition levels of their child by exposing the child to maternal stress during infancy and the preschool period. In addition, some situations may have the child simply exhibit early manifestation of behavioral inhibition. There has been no parenting style that researchers have agreed upon to be the best to combat social inhibition. Park and Critic claim that a sensitive, accepting, and overprotective parenting is best to reduce negative behaviors because it will allow the child to practice self expression without judgment. However, Kagan hypothesized that firm parenting styles are better suited for socially inhibited children. Researchers supporting sensitive parenting believe that too firm of a parenting style will send a message to children that says they need to change.

=== Adolescence ===
Social inhibition has been widely studied in children; however, research on how it develops through adolescence and adulthood is not as prevalent. Although anxiety-related social problems are most commonly seen in adolescents, many of the behavioral traits are the same in adolescence as they are in childhood; withdrawing from unfamiliar people, situations and objects are all behavioral traits that have been observed in adolescents. Despite this, it has been tested that adolescents are more aware of social situations, and are more likely to be inhibited in public settings. Researchers found younger individuals to be more likely to differentiate between public and private settings when inquiring about potentially embarrassing issues. It is also thought that inhibition is in many ways addressed in childhood and adolescence simply because schools facilitate interactions with others. As an adult, the same facilitating circumstance may not occur unless the individual prompts them on their own. Gest states that adults do not have as many casual peer interactions and friendship opportunities that guide and support relationships unless they facilitate them on their own. Adolescent research has also shown that social inhibition is associated with a more negative emotional state in young men than women.

This is in contrast to a study that measured inhibition levels through self reports from the adolescent and their parents. West and Newman found that young American Indian women and their parents reported higher levels of inhibition than young American Indian men; in addition, the parental reports also predicted social anxiety in young American Indian women over young American Indian men. In this same study, relationship development with peers was investigated over time. West and Newman stated that low levels of behavioral inhibition had an association with early social and school situations and that were related to greater levels of socially mediated anxiety, especially negative evaluation of fear by peers. This study then speculates about the possibility that adolescents and children who have a generally positive social experience will be more aware of the status of these positive relationships, therefore more anxious about failure in their social domain. Other studies also discussed how in many cases, early behavioral inhibition is a risk factor for the development of chronic high school-age inhibition and possible social anxiety disorder. Although social inhibition can be a predictor of other social disorders there is not an extremely large portion of adolescents who have developed an anxiety disorder and also had a history of inhibition in childhood.

To summarize, Kerr believes that appearance can be a factor for social inhibition. In their study, they hypothesized that a way to handle difficult situations with behavioral inhibition was to present an off-putting appearance. They examined "radical" crowds, such as those labeled as goths and punks, and if their appearances fulfilled a function for their inhibition. They state that a radical style could be used to draw away social boundaries and relieve them of pressures or expectations to interact in unfamiliar situations with unfamiliar peers. Another possibility is that an individual may be self-handicapping to ensure that they will not have to interact with unfamiliar peers. The results revealed that radicals were significantly more inhibited than other groups. However, there are other inhibited individuals in other social classifications. The highest-inhibited radical was no more inhibited than the highest-inhibited individual in other groups.

=== Adulthood ===
Adult cases of social inhibition are hard to come by simply because many see it as something that happens solely through development. Although research is lacking, developmental considerations suggest there may be a stronger association between behavioral inhibition and peer relations in adulthood. One researcher says this lack of information may be because adults are not put in as many socially interactive situations that would guide them through the situation. It would seem that adults have an increased responsibility to initiate or structure their own social peer relationships; this is where social inhibition could have a more problematic role in adulthood than in childhood. One study that had contributed to adult research used questionnaires to study both clinical and nonclinical adults. Like in adolescence, behavioral inhibition was also found to be associated with anxiety disorders in adulthood. In addition, the study found that childhood inhibition was specifically a factor in a lifetime diagnosis of social phobia. Gest also measured adult peer relations, and to what degree they had a positive and active social life. For example, researchers wanted to know if they participated in any recreational activities with others, how often they met with others, and if they had any close confiding relationships. The participants were rated on a 5-point scale on each peer relationship they disclosed. The results revealed that social inhibition had nothing to do with popularity, however it was correlated with peer relations in both genders and emotional stress in only men.

A similar study found that some shy men had a low occupational status at age forty because they entered their career later in life. However, another researcher has commented on this giving this example, speculating that remaining at home longer allows young adults to accumulate educational and financial resources before moving out and becoming more independent. Additionally, it was found that young adults who were inhibited as children were less likely to move away from their families. There is some discussion of the inhibition through generations and children mirroring their parents. Results indicated that children whose birth mothers met criteria for the diagnosis of social phobia showed elevated levels of observed behavioral inhibition. Social inhibition can decrease with age due to cognitive deficits that can occur in old age. Age-related deficits have an effect on older adults' ability to differentiate between public and private settings when discussing potentially embarrassing issues, leading them to discuss personal issues in inappropriately public situations. This suggests that deficits in inhibitory ability that lead to inappropriateness are out of the individual's control.

== In different contexts ==
=== In schools ===
Schools can be places for children to facilitate different social interactions; however, it can also uncover social and school adjustment problems. Coplan claims that Western children with inhibition problems may be at a higher risk of developmental problems in school. Although social inhibition may be a predictor of social and school adjustment problems in children, Chen argues that the effect of social inhibition on school adjustment differs between Western cultures and Chinese culture. Chen found that in Chinese children, behavioral inhibition was associated with greater peer liking, social interaction, positive school attitudes, and school competence with fewer later learning problems that differ from western cultures. In other studies, researchers such as Oysterman found there to be difficulties in adjustment in children that were experiencing inhibition. In Western cultures, these difficulties are seen more because of the emphasis on social assertiveness and self-expression as traits that are valued in development. In other cultures children are sometimes expected to be inhibited. This does not contrast with other cultures in which children are socialized and assert themselves. Despite these differences, there are also similarities between gender. Boys were observed to be more antagonistic in peer interaction and seemed to have more learning problems in school, while girls proved to be more cooperative in peer interaction while having a more positive outlook on school. Along with this, they formed more affiliations with peers, and performed more completely in school.

Other researchers like Geng have looked to understand social inhibition, effortful control, and attention in school. In Geng's study, gender came in to play with highly socially inhibited girls being extremely aware of their surroundings and possibly paying too much attention to potentially anxious situations. It is well known in a large number of research studies that social inhibition had been linked to other anxiety disorders; however, Degnan and colleagues believe that being able to regulate your effortful control may serve to reduce the anxiety the comes from inhibition. Nesdale and Dalton investigated inhibition of social group norms in school children between the ages of seven and nine, and found that in schools there is an increase in social in-groups and out-groups as children increase in age. This study created different in-groups or exclusive groups, and out-groups or inclusive groups. The results showed that students in the inclusive group liked all students more, while students in the exclusive group like their group over other groups. This study could help in the future to facilitate school peer groups more efficiently.

=== In the workplace ===
Social inhibition can manifest in all social situations and relationships. One place that we can see the effects of social inhibition is in the workplace. Research has shown that social inhibition can affect the way one completes a given amount of work. In one experiment, participants completed a task in a laboratory setting, varying whether or not another individual was present in the room with the participants while they attempted to complete the task. The results showed that when another individual was present in the room, the person focused on completing the experimental task decreased their body movements, hand movements, and vocalization, despite the other person not having spoken or looked at the participant. The results of this study suggest that the mere presence of another person in a social situation can inhibit an individual; however, although the individual in charge of completing the experimental task was socially inhibited by the presence of another person in the laboratory, there were no significant links between their social inhibition when completing the task and improved performance on said task. These findings suggest that an individual may socially inhibit themselves in the work place if another person is also in the room, however, such inhibition does not suggest that the inhibited individual is actually performing the duties assigned to them with more accuracy or focus.

== In psychological disorders ==
=== Depression ===
Links between social inhibition and depression can be found in individuals who have experienced social inhibited behaviors during childhood. Researchers from the United Kingdom conducted a study in an attempt to explain possible links between social inhibition in infancy and later signs of depression. The researchers based their study on previously found information from literature acknowledging that there are social and non-social forms of inhibition, and that social inhibition is significantly related to early social fears. The researchers hypothesized that social inhibition in childhood would be linked to higher levels of depression in later years. Participants completed a number of questionnaires about their experiences of social inhibition in childhood and their current levels of depression. Results showed a significant relationship between depression and recalled social fears or inhibitions during childhood. Furthermore, the researchers related their findings to another study conducted by Muris et al., in 2001, which found that there is an association between social inhibition and depression in adolescents. The study compared adolescents who were not inhibited to those who are, and found that "adolescents experiencing high levels of behavioral inhibition were more depressed than their counterparts who experienced intermediate or low levels of behavioral inhibition".

Another study set out to examine the link between social inhibition and depression, with the basis for their study being that social inhibition (which they explain as a part of type D personality, or distressed personality) is related to emotional distress. The researchers explain that a major factor related to social inhibition is the inhibited individual not expressing their emotions and feelings, a factor that the researchers cite in relation to the link between social inhibition and depression. Overall, the results of the study show that social inhibition (as a factor of type D personality) predicts depression, regardless of the baseline depression level of the individual. Significantly, this study was conducted with young, healthy adults, as opposed to working with those in self-help groups, or with individuals who have a preexisting medical or psychological condition.

=== Fear ===
Social inhibition can be affected by fear responses that one has in the early "toddler years" of their life. In 2011, researchers Elizabeth J. Kiel and Kristin A. Buss examined "how attention toward an angry-looking gorilla mask in a room with alternative opportunities for play in 24-month-old toddlers predicted social inhibition when children entered kindergarten". In the study, the researchers specifically examined the toddlers' attention to threat and their fear of novelty in other situations. The researchers paid special attention to these two factors, due to previous research suggesting that "sustained attention to putatively threatening novelty relates to anxious behavior in the first 2 years of life". Previously, it has been found in earlier research conducted by Buss and colleagues that no matter the differences, individual responses to novelty during early childhood can be related to later social inhibition. These results already link fear responses, particularly in children, to social inhibition, mainly such inhibition that manifests later on in the individual's life. Overall, the researchers based their experiment on the notion that the more time a toddler spends being attentive towards a novel potential threat, the greater the chance that they will experience issues with the regulation of distress, which can predict anxious behavior such as social inhibition.

Through a study intended to further connect and understand links between fear and late social inhibitions, the researchers conducted a study in which they worked with 24-month-old toddlers. They placed the toddlers in a room referred to as the "risk room", which was furnished with a number of play areas for the toddlers to interact with, one of those areas being a potentially threatening stimulus; in this case, an angry looking gorilla mask. The children, with only their primary caregiver sitting in the corner of the room, were left to explore the play areas for three minutes, after which the experimenter returned and instructed the toddler to interact with each of the play areas. The purpose of the study was to allow for other experimenters to code the reactions of the toddler to the stimuli around him or her, paying special attention to their attention to threat, their proximity to the threat, and their fear of novelty.

The results of this study indicate that attention to threat (in this case, attention given by the toddler to the feared stimuli) predicts social inhibition in kindergarten. Further, if the child approaches the feared stimuli, the relation to later social inhibition is not significant. When a child's behavior is to keep more than two feet away from the threatening stimulus, their behavior can be seen as linked to later social inhibition. Another important factor that the researchers found when looking at the prediction of social inhibition is the child paying a significant amount of attention to a feared or threatening stimuli in the presence of other, more enjoyable activities. Mainly, if the child's duration of attention to the threatening stimuli is significant even when there are other enjoyable activities available for them to interact with, the link to later social inhibition is stronger due to the fact that "toddler-aged children have increased motoric skill and independence in exploring their environments; so they are capable of using more sophisticated distraction techniques, such as involvement with other activities".

In another study looking at social inhibition and fear, the researchers made the distinction between different forms of inhibition. Mainly looking at behavioral inhibition, the researchers separated the category into two subcategories: social behavioral inhibition and non-social behavioral inhibition. The researchers cite an experiment conducted by Majdandzic and Van den Boom, in which a laboratory setting was used to attempt to elicit fear in children. They did this with the use of both social and non-social stimuli. What Majdandizic and Van der Boom found was a variability in the way that fear was elicited in the children when using either the social or non-social stimuli. In summary, the study found that there is a correlation between social stimuli producing fear expressions in children, whereas non-social stimuli is not correlated to fear. This can be evidence of social inhibition due to the social stimuli that result in fear expressions in children.

The researchers of the current study took the results from the Majdandizic and Van der Boom study and expanded on their work by looking at variability in fear expressions in both socially inhibited children and non-socially inhibited children. What they found was that it was mainly socially inhibited children who had effects such as shyness and inhibition with peers, adults, and in performance situations, as well as social phobia and separation anxiety. The stronger link with fear reactions comes mainly from those children who were non-socially behaviorally inhibited. While these results go against previous findings, what the researchers were eager to stipulate was that "the normative development of fear in children have indicated that many specific fears (e.g., fear of animals) decline with age, whereas social fears increase as children get older".

=== Social phobia ===
Social inhibition is linked to social phobia, in so much as social inhibition during childhood can be seen as a contributing factor to developing social phobia later on in life. While social inhibition is also linked to social anxiety, it is important to point out the difference between social anxiety and social phobia. Social anxiety is marked by a tendency to have high anxiety before a social interaction, but not experience the avoidance of the social activity that is associated with social phobia. Social phobia and social inhibition are linked in a few different ways, one being physiologically. When one is experiencing extreme levels of inhibition they can suffer from symptoms such as accelerated heart rate, increased morning salivary cortisol levels, and muscle tension in their vocal cords. These symptoms are also reported by those with social phobia, which indicates that both social inhibition and social phobia interact with the sympathetic nervous system when the individual encounters a stressful situation.

Further, it is suggested throughout literature that social inhibition during childhood is linked to later social phobia. Beyond that research has indicated that continuity in inhibition plays an important role in the later development of social phobia. Continuity of social inhibition means someone experiencing social inhibition for a number of year continuously. The research explains work done with young teenagers, which found that the teenagers who had been classified as inhibited 12 years earlier were significantly more likely to develop social phobia than young teenagers who were not classified as inhibited. This research pertains to the link between social inhibition and generalized social phobia, rather than specific phobias. When looking at continuity in social inhibition some research offers reasoning as to why the social inhibition may continue long enough to be a predictor of social phobia. Researchers have suggested that if the early childhood relationships are not satisfactory they can influence the child to respond to situations in certain inhibitory ways. When this happens it is often then associated with poor self-evaluation for the child, which can lead to increased social inhibition and social phobia. Also, if a child is neglected or rejected by their peers, rather than by their caregiver, they often develop a sense of social failure, which often extends into social inhibition, and later social phobia. The link between social inhibition and social phobia is somewhat exclusive, when testing for a possible link between non-social inhibition and social phobia no predictive elements were found. It is particularly social inhibition that is linked to social phobia.

The research also suggests that social inhibitions can be divided between different kinds of social fears, or different patterns of inhibition can be seen in individuals. The researchers suggest that certain patterns, or certain social fears, can be better predictors of social phobia than others. Mainly, the researchers suggest that there can be different patterns of social inhibition in relation to an unfamiliar object or encounter. These specific patterns should be looked at in conjunction with motivation and the psychophysiological reaction to the object or encounter to determine the specific patterns that are the better predictors of social phobia.

Another study aimed to examine the link between social inhibition and social phobia also found that social phobia is linked to the social phobic being able to recall their own encounters with social inhibition during childhood. The social phobic participants were able to recall social and school fears from their childhood, but they also were able to recall sensory processing sensitivity which indicates that the social phobic participants in the study were able to recall having increased sensitivity to the situations and behaviors around them.

Another study explains that social phobia itself has a few different ways it can manifest. The study aims at understanding the link between social inhibition and social phobia, as well as depression in social phobia. What the study found was an important link connecting the severity of social inhibition during childhood to the severity of social phobia and factors of social phobia in later years. Severe social inhibition during childhood can be related to lifetime social phobia. Further, the researchers point out that inhibition during childhood is significantly linked to avoidant personality disorder in social phobia, as well as childhood inhibition linked with major depressive disorder in social phobia that spans across the individual's lifetime. A major suggestion related to the results of the study suggested that while inhibition can be a general predictor of risk factors related to social phobia, it may not be a specific predictor of social phobia alone.

=== Social anxiety disorder ===
Social anxiety disorder is characterized by a fear of scrutiny or disapproval from others. Individuals believe this negative reaction will bring about rejections. Individuals with social anxiety disorder have stronger anxious feeling over a long period of time and are more anxious more often.

In many cases, researchers have found that social inhibition can be a factor in developing other disorders such as social anxiety disorder. Being inhibited does not mean that an individual will develop another disorder; however, Clauss and colleagues conducted a study to measure the association between behavioral inhibition and social anxiety disorder. The results of the study discovered that 15% of all children have behavioral inhibition and about half of those children will eventually develop social anxiety disorder. This is why behavioral inhibition is seen as a larger risk factor. That being said, Lim and colleagues researched the differences between early and late onset of social anxiety disorder and its relation to social inhibition. Through the duration of their study, they found those diagnosed as early onset had complaints other than ones about social anxiety symptoms. Early onset individuals would frequently have more severe symptoms and higher levels of behavioral inhibition. Additional behavioral inhibition was more severe especially in social and school situations with only the early onset cases. Lorian and Grisham researched the relationship between behavioral inhibition, risk-avoidance, and social anxiety symptoms. They found that all three factors correlated with each other and risk avoidance is potentially a mechanism linked to an anxiety pathology.

== Factors that reduce social inhibition ==
=== Alcohol consumption ===
Social inhibition can be lowered by a few different factors, one of them being alcohol. Alcohol consumption can be seen to lower inhibitions in both men and women. Social inhibitions generally act to control or affect the way that one conducts themselves in a social setting. By lowering inhibitions alcohol can work to increase social behaviors either negatively or positively. Importantly, one must remember that the higher the dosage of alcohol, the greater the damage it will cause to inhibitory control.

By lowering inhibitions, alcohol can cause social behaviors such as aggression, self-disclosure, and violent acts. Researchers have suggested that situational cues used to inhibit social behaviors are not perceived the same way after someone consumes enough alcohol to qualify them as drunk: "interacting parties who are impaired by alcohol are less likely to see justifications for the other's behavior, are thus more likely to interpret the behavior as arbitrary and provocative, and then, having less access to inhibiting cues and behavioral standards, are more likely to react extremely." This idea of increased extreme social behaviors is believed to come as a result of lowered inhibitions after consuming alcohol. Alcohol can lower inhibitions for a number of reasons, it can reduce one's self-awareness, impair perceptual and cognitive functioning, allows for instigator pressures to have more influence over an individual, and can reduce one's ability to read inhibitory social cues and standards of conduct.

When attempting to examine the effects that alcohol consumption has on social inhibition researchers found that after being provoked sober individuals used inhibiting cues, such as the innocence of the instigator and the severity of the retaliation to control their response to the aggressive provocation. However, the researchers found that an intoxicated individual did not have these same inhibitions and, as a result, exhibited more extreme behaviors of retaliated aggression to the provocation without processing information they would normally consider about the situation. On average, drunken individuals exhibited more aggression, self-disclosure, risk taking behaviors, and laughter than sober individuals. Extreme behaviors are not as common in sober individuals because they are able to read inhibitory cues and social conduct norms that drunken individuals are not as inclined to consider. These negative social behaviors, then, are a result of lowered social inhibitions.

Alcohol consumption also has the ability to lower inhibitions in a positive way. Research has been conducted looking at the way an intoxicated person is more inclined to be helpful. Researchers were of the same opinion that alcohol lowers inhibitions and allows for more extreme behaviors, however, they tested to see if this would be true for more socially acceptable situations, such as helping another person. The researchers acknowledged that, generally, an impulse to help another is initiated but then inhibitions will cause the potential helper to consider all factors going into their decision to help or not to help, such as lost time, boredom, fatigue, monetary costs, and possibility of personal harm. The researchers suggest that while one may be inhibited and therefore less likely to offer help when completely sober, after consuming alcohol enough damage will be done to their inhibitory functioning to actually increase helping. While this suggestion differs from socially negative behaviors that are seen after social inhibitions have been lowered, it is consistent with the idea that alcohol consumption can lower inhibitions and, as a result, produce more socially extreme behaviors when compared to a sober counterpart.

Alcohol consumption can lower social inhibitions in both men and women, producing social behaviors not typical in the individuals' day-to-day sober lives. For example, in social settings women will tend to be uncomfortable with sexual acts and provocations as well as feeling uncomfortable in social settings that are generally male dominated such as strip clubs or bars. However, consumption of alcohol has been seen to lower these inhibitions, making women feel freer and more ready to participate socially in events and behaviors that they would normally feel inhibited from participating in if they were sober. As an example, women participating in bachelorette parties generally consume copious amounts of alcohol for the event. As a result, the females feel less inhibited and are more likely to then engage in behavior that they would normally view as deviant or inappropriate. In an examination of bachelorette parties it was found that when those attending the party consumed only a couple of drinks, behavior minimally reflected any alcohol consumption, assuming that the party guests were still socially inhibited and less inclined to perform deviant behaviors. Similarly, "levels of intoxication were correlated with the atmosphere of the party, such that parties with little or no alcohol were perceived as less 'wild' than parties a lot of alcohol consumption." Conceivably, the bachelorette parties show tendencies of "wild" behavior after excessive alcohol consumption, which consequently lowers the inhibitions of the consumers.

When surveyed a number of women who had attended a bachelorette party, or had one in their honor, in the past year reported that their behavior when under the influence of alcohol was different from their behavior when sober. One party guest reported: "People drink … to lose inhibitions and stuff that is done… I would never do sober. It lowers inhibitions - that is the main point of it." These reports suggest that "alcohol was used to lower inhibitions about being too sexual, about the risk of being perceived as promiscuous, or about being sexual in public. Women commented that they felt freer to talk about sex while under the influence of alcohol, to flirt with male strangers, or to dance with a male stripper." The research collected surrounding women and their alcohol consumption in these settings provide examples of the reduction of social inhibitions in relation to excess alcohol consumption.

=== Power ===
Social inhibitions can also be reduced by means unrelated to an actual substance. Another way that social inhibition can be decreased is by the attainment of power. Research has examined the way that having either elevated or reduced power affects social interactions and well-being in social situations. Such research has shown a relationship between elevated power and decreased social inhibitions. This relationship of those with elevated power and those with reduced power can be seen in all forms of social interactions, and is marked by elevated power individuals often having access to resources that the reduced power individuals do not have. Decreased social inhibition is seen in those with elevated power for two main reasons, one being that they have more access to resources, providing them with comforts and stability. The second reason is that their status as a high power individual often provides the powerful individual a sense of being above social consequences, allowing them to act in ways that a reduced power individual may not.

The elevated power individuals will experience reduced social inhibition in various ways, one being that they are more likely to approach, rather than avoid, another person. Also, with the reduced inhibition associated with high power individuals, they are more likely to initiate physical contact with another person, enter into their personal space, and they are more likely to indicate interest in intimacy. High power people tend to be socially disinhibited when it comes to sexual behavior and sexual concepts. Consistent with this expectation, a study working with male and female participants found that when the male and female felt equally powerful they tended to interact socially with one another in a disinhibited manner.

Further, the research suggests that as a result of their reduced social inhibition, powerful individuals will be guided to behave in a way that fits with their personality traits in a social situation in which they feel powerful. Similarly, in a laboratory study it was found that when one person in a group feels powerful their reduced social inhibition can result in decreased manners. The study found that, when offered food, the powerful individual is more likely to take more than the other individuals in the room. This can be seen as the powerful individual exhibiting reduced social inhibitions, as they reduce their attention to common social niceties such as manners and sharing.

== Factors that increase social inhibition ==
=== Power ===
Certain factors can increase social inhibition in individuals. Increased inhibitions can occur in different situations and for different reasons. One major factor that contributes to the increase of social inhibition is power. Reduced power is linked to an array of negative affect, one of which being increased social inhibitions. Power, in this instance, can be defined as a fundamental factor in social relationships that is central to interactions, influencing behavior and emotional display. Further, power is such an essential factor in social relationships because power determines who is the giver and who is the receiver in the exchange of rewards and resources. Power is present in all social relationships, not just typical hierarchical establishments such as in employment or school settings. Power, then, is related to increased social inhibitions when an individual feels that they are in a powerless or diminished power position. Those who are deemed to be high in power are generally richer in resources and freedom, as well as decreased levels of social inhibition, whereas those who are deemed to be low in power are generally low in resources, constrained, and prone to experiencing increased social inhibition.

Research shows that individuals who are considered to be low in power experience more social threats and punishments, and generally have less access to social resources. As a result of this these individuals are prone to developing more sensitivity to criticism from others, and are more susceptible to accepting when someone constrains them. These factors contribute to increasing social inhibition in those individuals. Similarly, studies have shown that the absence of power can heighten the processes associated with social inhibition. Experiments on the interaction between power and inhibition have shown that when participants are in a situation where they perceive more punishments and threats their cognition and behavior will show more signs of social inhibition related affect. Environments which distinguish the differences between the powerful and the powerless can lead to the social inhibition of the power reduced individuals as a response to their social interactions with the heightened power individuals.

Some of the social inhibited behaviors that a low-power individual will experience in these social situations will be embarrassment and fear and they may even go on to feel guilt, sadness, and shame (C. Anderson, Langner, & Keltner). Further, low power individuals can be seen socially inhibiting themselves in ways that can, in the end, favor the high-power individuals. These can include inhibiting themselves from providing input on ideas, hesitating in normal speech, and even increasing their facial muscle actions in order to keep themselves from displaying emotions. When the low-power individuals are in a social situation with a high-power individual they will also commonly exhibit social inhibition by inhibiting their postural constriction and reducing their gestures (Ellyson & Dovidio). Researchers have generalized these suggestions of interaction between a high-power individual and low-power individuals to say that these expressions of social inhibition are expected to carry over into all areas of social interaction for the low-power individual. That is to say that low-power individuals will not only exhibit social inhibition when in the presence of a high-power individual. They will continue to be socially inhibited in all social aspects of their lives as a result of their low-power status. Further, low-power individuals tend to devote increased attention to the actions and behaviors of others.

=== Biological factors ===
Another plausible explanation for increased social inhibition has to do with biological factors. A study of brain activity in those who rate high on the scale for social inhibition showed a number of brain areas that are related to the heightened inhibitions. In their study the researchers aimed to find the link between socially inhibited individuals and an over activation of the cortical social brain network. The researchers did this by examining the brain activity of individuals who rate high in social inhibition as they respond to video clips of facial and bodily expressions that were potentially threatening. What the researchers found was that those who rate high in social inhibition show an overactive orbitofrontal cortex, left temporo-parietal junction, and right extrastriate body area. When the threat -related activity was being presented to the participants, these areas of the brain showed increased activity in comparison to those who do not rate high for social inhibition. What the researchers speculate is that, in this instance, hyperactivity in these brain structures does not mean better functioning. Further, "the orbitofrontal cortex is connected with areas that underlie emotional function and empathy". This relates to one's ability to stimulate how another person feels in their own facial displays. The over activity and decreased function of these brain structures can affect individuals by increasing social inhibition and behaviors related to social inhibition.

=== Personality traits ===
Further, there is speculation that social inhibition can also be increased by the type of personality an individual has and behaviors that those individuals inherently display. Namely, those who are dependent and reassurance seeking are more commonly likely to display increased social inhibition.

== Clinical levels ==
Although social inhibition can occur as part of ordinary social situations, a chronically high level of social inhibition may lead some individuals to develop other social or anxiety disorders that would also need to be handled clinically. Through childhood, adolescence, and adulthood, clinical levels of social inhibition can be measured. Social inhibition can be a precursors for other social disorders that can develop in adolescence or adulthood.

=== Measures ===
There are many implications for the diagnoses of social inhibition, however there are many cost-efficient ways to measure and treat this social disorder. One measure that has reliably assess the traits of social inhibition is the seven-item inhibition scale of the Type D Scale–14. Another measure is the Behavioral Inhibition Observation System (BIOS). In clinical trials this measure is to be used for children completed by parents, teachers, and clinicians. Other scales are the Behavioral Inhibition Questionnaire (BIQ), Behavioral Inhibition Instrument (BII), the Behavioral Inhibition Scale (BIS), The Preschool Behavioral Inhibition Scale (P-BIS), and the Behavioral Inhibition Scale for children ages 3–6. There are also many versions of these scales that are specifically for parents, teachers, or even the child or possibly an inhibited individual to take. There are also times when these measures are grouped together; in many cases the Behavioral Inhibition System scale and Behavioral Activation System scale are used together. These two measure are the most widely used and together they consist of behavioral inhibition and behavioral activation scales that deal with reward response and fun seeking. The Behavioral Paradigm System is an observation system that allows measurements of behavioral inhibition in systematic natural environments. With this system researchers will observe cessation of play and vocalization, long latencies to approaching the unfamiliar person, signs of fear and negative affect, and security seeking in environments such as classrooms, playgrounds, and in home settings. This paradigm was followed by many adaptations, one specifically was the adaptation of the Observational Paradigm. In an additional study by Ballespi and colleagues the paradigm was changed to be more suitable for a school environment. The adapted paradigm met three important criteria, the tests were suitable for a school environment, there had to be materials for the test that could be transported easily, and the observation of behavioral inhibition signs had to have the potential to be seen in a short period of time.

Ballespi and colleagues discussed one of the most recent measurement systems in the Behavioral Inhibition Observation System. This new system will allow clinicians to provide a quick measure for behavioral inhibition. This system is used during the first meeting with the child. In this first meeting, the child will be exposed to a strange, unfamiliar situation. The scale will then be completed after the therapist has time to observe the child in an interview setting. Researchers want to find a way to have an actual measure for inhibition, however this is difficult. There is a difference in observations, a parent or teachers is going to observe the child over long periods of time in several natural situations. The parents do not actually observe the child but instead rate the behavior inhibition on the ideas they have formed about the child. The clinician will not have all this information and will base his or her first measure on observation alone; they measure state while parents and teachers measure traits. This is where the differences come up in measure however after several visits the measures of the clinicians, teachers, and parents become more similar.

=== Treatments ===
Treatments used for social inhibition are primarily assertive trainings introduced by therapies. These treatments are about teaching the inhibited individual to express and assert their feeling instead of inhibiting them. Assertiveness training is an important operation for behavioral therapist because it can help with behavioral issues, as well as interpersonal inadequacies, and anxiety in adults. In some cases this training can go by a different name because assertiveness is sometimes categorized by aggression therefore it can also be called appropriate expression training.

In one study discussing assertive training Ludwig and Lazarus found irrational cognitive patterns that inhibited individuals have to deal with and how to overcome them. The four patterns are self-criticism/Perfectionism, unrealistic approval needs, unrealistic labeling of aggression/assertive behavior, and criticism of others. There are three different phases that work to combat the irrational cognitive patterns and inhibitory actions during social situations. These phases are meant to be actively practiced. The individual will receive homework assignments, and have to do role-playing exercises to overcome their inhibitions. The first phase discussed was about talking more. Ludwig states that there cannot just be an increase in talking but also an increase in expressing and talking about how one feels. The point of this phase is to get an individual talking no matter how ridiculous or trivial it may seem. Phase two is about dealing with the responses that come from talking more. When an inhibited individual starts talking more they may become embarrassed. However, with positive reactions from others they will learn that being embarrassed about some of the comments made is not devastating, and in turn the individual may talk and act more freely. In addition to the positive feedback the individual will review particularly embarrassing moment to assess why they were embarrassed to help combat those thoughts. If the inhibited person can understand the irrational thoughts they will eventually feel less embarrassed and act more freely. Role playing is also a way to help the individual understand different social behaviors. Mirroring is a way some therapist will show the client their own behavior. The last phase deals with additional strategies that can help through social situation such as expressing disagreement, dealing with interruptions, initiating more conversations topics, and more self-disclosure. Ludwig and colleagues also make sure to explain that no one should compulsively apply these behavioral techniques in all situations. An individual should not go over board using them; additionally there are times when initiating some conversation topics and talking more are inappropriate.

Group therapies are also used in the treatment using assertiveness. Hedquist and Weinhold investigated two group counseling strategies with socially anxious and unassertive college students. The first strategy is a behavioral rehearsal group, which aims to assist members to learn more efficient responses in social situations. This was to be accomplished by rehearsing several difficult social situations. The second strategy was a social learning group that was about honesty about everything; any withholding behaviors were seen as being dishonest. Another rule was every individual had to take responsibility for everything that said. The results of this study showed that both strategies helped significantly in treating the anxiety and unassertive.

== See also ==
- Attention-deficit hyperactivity disorder
- Avoidant personality disorder
- Sexual inhibition
- Social anxiety
- Social facilitation
