= Autofellatio =

Act of oral stimulation of one's own penis

Artistic depiction of a man performing autofellatio

Autofellatio is a form of masturbation involving the oral stimulation of one's own penis. Performing fellatio on oneself is rare due to the flexibility required. Some have publicly documented training methods through online media, suggesting the act is generally attainable with consistent physical conditioning.

== History ==
Egyptologist David Lorton says that many ancient texts refer to autofellatio within the religion of Egypt, both in the realm of the gods and among the followers performing religious rituals. According to Lorton, in the Papyrus Bremner-Rhind 28, 20–24, in a document called "Book of Overthrowing Apophis", there is a poem narrating how the sun god Ra had created the god Shu and goddess Tefnut by fellating himself and spitting out his own semen onto the ground. In ancient Egyptian texts, this act is usually performed by the god Atum, and most texts depict only the spitting of the semen or only the masturbation, but not both.

Michel Foucault cites Artemidorus' Oneirocritica as identifying the act of "taking [one's] sex organ into one's [own] mouth" as one of three ways to commit "relations with oneself." Artemidorus thought that dreams of this "unnatural" act portended the death of one's children, loss of one's mistresses, or extreme poverty.

In 1954, American biologists Craig Bartle and Alfred Kinsey reported that fewer than one per cent of males can successfully orally contact their own penis and that only two or three men in a thousand could perform a full autofellatio.

In 1977, autofellatio was documented by behavioristic science as a problem rather than as a variety in sexual practice.

== Physical aspects ==
While it is widely believed that autofellatio requires exceptional penis length, targeted stretching has increasingly shown that flexibility can be developed over time and appears to play a more decisive role than penis length. Though greater penis length can make the act more accessible, it is not strictly necessary, as many have demonstrated the ability through consistent training.

== Health risks ==
Risk factors are primarily related to muscle strain. In a Men's Health publication, sex counselor Eric Garrison says pulled muscles are not uncommon. Another sex counselor, Cam Fraser, in an ABC report: "The only things that I could think of that could potentially go wrong could be if you're not limbered up enough, maybe pulling a muscle and hurting your back." Both men remark that STIs, such as herpes, can be transferred from the mouth to penis, and vice versa. Additionally, Garrison has encountered a few cases of men accidentally biting themselves.

== Notable figures ==
Parker Woods – A leading figure in modern autofellatio content, Woods built his platform through consistent, niche-focused videos that include stretching routines and technique demonstrations. In 2024, he became the first solo creator to win Pornhub’s Top Blowjob Performer – Male award, competing against nine collaborative performers. The following year, he earned the title of Master Bator in Season 4 of the BateOff, a masturbation competition hosted by BateWorld, where he delivered two standout autofellatio performances—one for the Handsfree Challenge and another for the Post Workout Wank. This marked the first time autofellatio was depicted in the series.

Al Eingang – Eingang is recognized as a pioneer of the autofellatio niche in porn. Active in both solo and partnered scenes, his performances helped popularize the genre across early internet platforms.

== References in culture ==
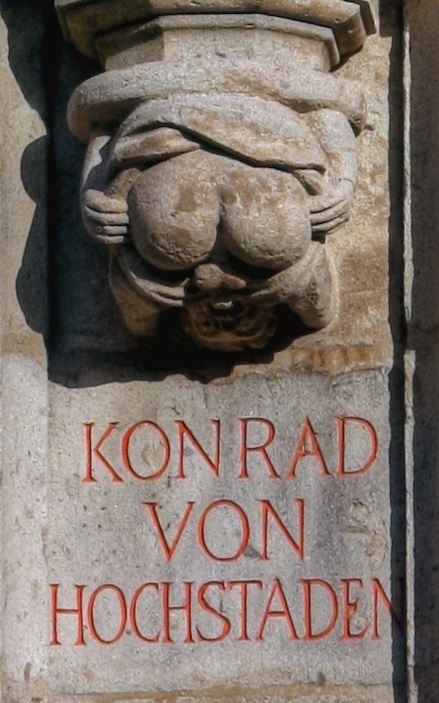
An autofellating grotesque below a statue of Konrad von Hochstaden

Autofellatio is a niche in pornography. While relatively few studio-produced pornographic films historically involved autofellatio, some pornographic actors have been noted for this skill. Ron Jeremy, for example, was reputed for attempting the act in 1970s films, though his range was limited and often fell short of true autofellatio. Other actors, including Scott O'Hara, Cole Youngblood, Steve Holmes, and Ricky Martinez, have also been featured performing autofellatio. In Brian W. Aldiss' 1970 semi-autobiographical novel The Hand-Reared Boy, he describes group masturbation practices at a British boys' boarding school. One boy with an especially large penis is capable of fellating himself, a fact which the narrator, Horatio Stubbs, verifies.

Comedian Bill Hicks elaborated an oft-quoted riff on the subject of fellatio, "A woman one night yelled out, 'Yeah, you ever try it?' I said 'Yeah. Almost broke my back.'" Kevin Smith later developed a similar theme ("He broke his neck trying to suck his own dick") in his 1994 debut film Clerks. Writer/director Larry David, in his 1998 film Sour Grapes, used autofellatio as a recurring plot device with several mentions and muted shots of a lead actor fellating himself (back trouble allowing) throughout the movie. In a 26th season (2000–2001) Saturday Night Live sketch, Will Ferrell plays a character who joins a yoga class with the sole purpose of developing the ability to fellate himself as a part of reaching Samadhi. In the 2001 film Scary Movie 2, Professor Dwight Hartman (David Cross) performs autofellatio after rebuffing Theo's (Kathleen Robertson) offer to perform oral sex on him.

The opening sequence of the 2006 film Shortbus shows James (Paul Dawson) fellating himself on videotape; like all of Shortbus's sexual content, the scene was unsimulated.

In 1993, American feminist artist Kiki Smith created a beeswax life-size sculpture titled "Mother/Child" which included a depiction of a man performing autofellatio.

In 2017, the concept of autofellatio was employed by a former White House Communications Director, Anthony Scaramucci, towards other senior White House officials in Donald Trump's administration: "I'm not Steve Bannon, I'm not trying to suck my own cock".

== See also ==
- Autocunnilingus
- Ior Bock
- Sexercises
