= Keith Griffith (activist) =

American gay activist (1959–2012)

Darrell Keith Griffith (1959–September 18, 2012) was an American gay activist, pornographic film producer, writer, and webmaster. He was known for "courageously steering the gay rights movement beyond the bounds of traditional political and legal response to threats to the community's civil rights," and for operating a seminal and popular website for sexual assignation, cruisingforsex.com.

== Early life ==
Keith Griffith was born into a strict, Southern Baptist family. He married his high-school sweetheart, but divorced a year later.

== Activism ==
In 1986, in response to increasing discrimination against people with AIDS, Griffith co-founded the San Francisco AIDS group Citizens For Medical Justice. Advocating greater militancy, and confrontation with the state, medical establishment and pharmaceutical industry, it became a lightning rod for activism. In a letter published by the San Francisco Sentinel, he stated: "We can no longer afford to work through proper channels, if we ever could. Our very right to exist is under fire in ways most of us have not seen since the modern gay rights movement began."

The group's first action was a sit-in at the office of California Governor George Deukmejian, who had refused to sign a bill banning discrimination against people with AIDS. The protest resulted in arrests, but The San Francisco Sentinel named Griffith 'Man Of The Year', particularly as the protest had taken place, as it wrote: "despite the absence of support from the state's so-called gay leadership". Although small, the group's radicalism inspired others, including ACT UP, which was founded the following year.

Griffith also protested against attempts to discount, minimize, and deny the existence of gay people, including in attempts to mainstream their experience. In 1988 he was outraged when organizers behind a display of the AIDS Quilt avoided mention of their centrality to the event.

== Publishing ==
In 1993, together with activist, pornstar, and trust fund beneficiary Scott O'Hara, he founded the quarterly Steam magazine, which while focused on gay saunas, committed itself to celebrating “all kinds of sex, but especially public, publicly-disapproved, exciting sex.” In their association, O'Hara was an "all-in-one confidante, employer, and sometime lover...Both men approached sex as if it were their last meal." Griffith rejected and objected to "the accelerated mainstreaming of gay male life" and its homogenisation, believing that identity categories "limit the fluidity of sex". He also viewed public sex "as the solution to centuries of sexual repression." Griffith's other partners were Jay Rindal and Oscar Macias.

== Cruising For Sex ==
Griffith established cruisingforsex.com in 1995, which listed public places where men could find sex partners. It led him to being called "the founder of the [online] hookup industry." The site also tracked arrests and police activity, and inside information of planned sting operations, as well as 'horror stories' of those arrested. According to one account, O'Hara had told Griffith: "'If you want safety, don’t have sex because sex is risky.' Safety was not the point; fully living was the point. O’Hara believed that life, gay life, should be more than mere biological survival." In 1997 the site was attracting 130,000 visits a day; by the following year this had exploded to 600,000 visits a day, making it, Keith claimed, the most popular gay website in the world. It led to Griffith and the website being profiled by mainstream media, particularly when police began using the site to arrest men in campaigns of entrapment. Griffith believed the later decline of public gay sex venues was due to success of the gay and lesbian rights movement, and the assimilation of gay people. By April 2025, the website announced it would go offline, with its administrator citing technological and legal challenges, as well as his other responsibilities, as reasons for its closure.

== Later life ==
Griffith left San Francisco around 2000, relocating to New Orleans. Following Hurricane Katrina in 2005, he moved to Atlanta and then Augusta, Georgia to be closer to his family, and where he died of AIDS-related cancer.

== Legacy ==
Keith Griffith's papers reside in the John J. Wilcox Jr. LGBT Archives, at William Way LGBT Community Center, Philadelphia.
