= Distressed personality type =

Distressed personality type, or "type D" individuals, tend to suppress powerful negative emotions as a means of coping with stressful events or situations. These individuals suppress feelings of anger or sorrow even when they are in an environment that is supportive of emotional expression, such as suppressing anger when clearly justified, or refusing to cry at a funeral. The type D individual tends to be anxious, irritable, insecure, and uncomfortable with strangers. These types of people are constantly experiencing and anticipating negative emotions, which results in their being more tense and inhibited around others.

== History ==
The type D personality was defined in the 1990s, describing individuals who experience feelings of negativity, depression, anxiety, stress, chronic anger, and loneliness. The distressed personality type is also prone to pessimism, low self-esteem, and difficulty making personal connections with others. It is thought that about 20% of otherwise-healthy Americans fall under this category.

In 1996, Dr. Denollet reported a longitudinal study of 286 men and women who had enrolled in a cardiac rehabilitation program. At the beginning of the program, each participant filled out a questionnaire in order to determine whether they fell under the type D pattern. Eight years later, researchers tracked down the participants in order to find out who had died, and who was still alive. Among those who had been classified as type D, 27% had died; meanwhile only 7% of the non-Ds had died. The majority of these deaths were due to heart disease or stroke. Since this study, the type D personality subtype has been thought to be associated with early death, increased risk for developing cardiovascular problems, poorer response to proven treatments for heart disease, and increased chances of sudden cardiac arrest.

== Diagnostic criteria ==
A 14-question scale is used to determine whether an individual can be categorized as having a type D personality type. This scale, the D-Scale 14, aims to measure negativity as well as social inhibition. Each of the 14 items on the scale is rated according to a 5-point Likert scale, from 0 to 4 (false to true). Individuals who score high (above a 10) on both negativity and social inhibition can be classified as type D.

This questionnaire was developed based on the idea that individuals who score high on negative affectivity are dysphoric and have a negative view of self. They are also prone to more somatic symptoms, and focus more on negative situations and stimuli. Scoring high on social inhibition means that these individuals tend to avoid the potential 'dangers' involved in social interactions, such as disapproval. Generally speaking, social situations tend to make type D individuals feel inhibited, tense, uncomfortable, and insecure.

== Health risks ==
A wide variety of health risks are associated with type D personalities, primarily due to the fact that they seem to lead to a more highly activated immune system and therefore, more inflammation. This increase in inflammation can often lead to damaged blood vessels throughout the heart and body. Type D individuals have also been found to have higher blood pressure than normal, as well as an exaggerated response to stress, both physiological and psychological.

Among the health issues commonly associated with this personality subtype are depressive and anxiety symptoms, as well as post-traumatic stress disorder. Additionally, type Ds are might have a predisposition to social phobia, panic disorder, and even the development of avoidant personality disorder.

According to Dr. Denollet, what most likely links poor health outcomes to the type D personality subtype is the distinctly high level of stress associated with it. Unlike other personality types who like to vent, type Ds social inhibition leaves them with no such outlet for their stress. This pent-up stress causes high cortisol levels, which, in turn, can lead to high blood pressure as well as chronic, artery-damaging inflammation. Another possible explanation for this correlation is that type Ds likely also have depression, anxiety, and poor social connections, each of which has been linked with poor health and heart disease.

=== Cardiovascular complications ===
Both type D dimensions (negative affectivity and social inhibition) are associated with a stress-induced increase in cortisol release. High levels of cortisol are thought to be the mediating factor in the association between this personality type and the increased risk for coronary heart disease.

Additionally, the inhibition of emotions that characterizes type D personality types is strongly associated with higher cardiovascular reactivity, lower cardiovascular recovery, lower heart rate variability, carotid atherosclerosis, incidence of coronary heart disease, and cardiac mortality. The correlation between emotional suppression and cardiovascular complications has been observed in numerous different studies, including one that involved patients undergoing cardiac rehabilitation. In this study, deaths from cardiac causes were increased by a factor of four in those with type D personality, even after controlling for conventional risk factors.

Another study, conducted by Appels et al, investigated the effect of type D behavior on sudden cardiac death. This study involved interviewing the next-of-kin of the sudden cardiac death victims to determine whether they were type D or not. Patients scoring high on negative affectivity and social inhibition (the two dimensions of the type D personality subtype) were found to be seven times more likely to suffer sudden cardiac death.

== See also ==
- Psychology
- Schizoid personality disorder
