= Sexercise =

Exercise for preparing sexual activity

Sexercise is physical exercise performed in preparation for sexual activity and designed to tone, build, and strengthen muscles. Sexercises are often performed as part of a sex diet lifestyle, which seeks to maximize the health benefits of regular sexual activity. Sexercise is known to improve and quicken the flow of oxygenated blood, in higher and consistent amounts, along with other beneficial chemical compounds, to the genitalia, which is important for fertility and important during intercourse.

== Routines ==
Sexercises range from kegel exercise to aerobic exercise and cardiovascular routines. Flexibility for performing contortion specifically for erotic or sexual positions may also be practised.
