= Penile–vaginal intercourse =

Form of human sexual intercourse

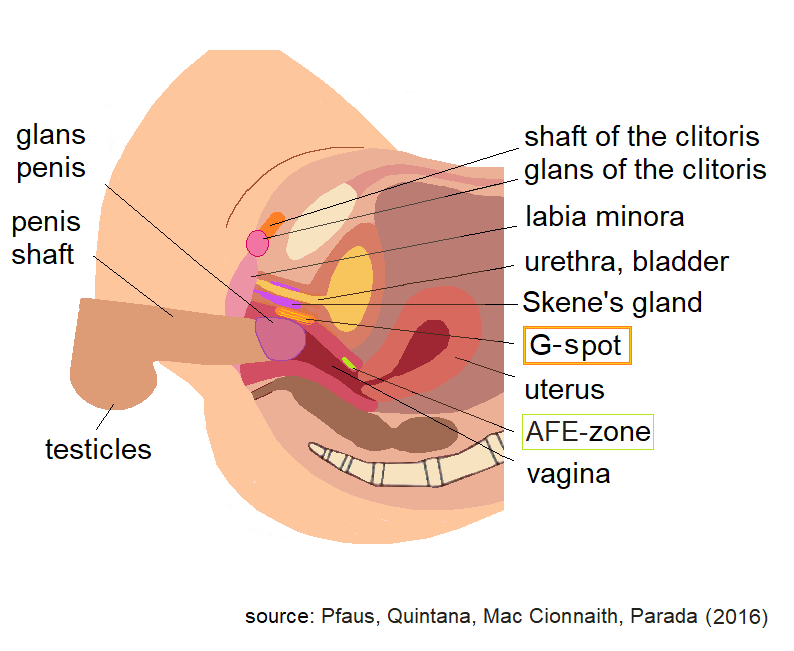
Cross-section diagram of penile penetration of the vagina

Penile–vaginal intercourse, or just vaginal intercourse, is the insertion of an erect penis into a vagina. It is the primary form of copulation in mammals, and of penetrative sexual intercourse in human sexuality. Synonyms are: vaginal sex, coitus (Latin: coitus per vaginam), (in elegant colloquial language) intimacy, or (poetic) lovemaking. (Note: Some of which are used for other forms of intercourse as well)

Various sex positions can be used during vaginal sex, and sometimes additional lubrication is desirable. Following penile insertion, additional stimulation is often achieved, by either partner, through rhythmic pelvic thrusting, or a gyration of the hips, among other techniques. The biological imperative is to achieve male ejaculation so that sperm can enter the female reproductive tract and fertilize the egg, thereafter beginning the next stage in human reproduction – pregnancy.

== Biological function ==
Processes in the human biological life cycle: 1. maturity; 2. spermatogenesis and oogenesis; 3. vaginal intercourse with internal fertilization; 4. zygote; 5. embryonic development; 6. childbirth; 7. adolescence.

The desire for sensual pleasure, or sometimes explicitly sexual pleasure, is usually the main motivation for humans, or sometimes the wish to have a baby, or to have more children. The biological function of vaginal intercourse is human reproduction. During coitus without a condom, sperm enter the vagina, first with the pre-ejaculate and then a larger amount through male ejaculation.

Sperm swim through the cervix and the uterus into the fallopian tubes of the woman. If they meet a fertilisable egg cell after or during an ovulation, or if an ovulation occurs hours or days later, one sperm can fertilize it. The resulting zygote develops into the early embryonic stages and, in the meantime, migrates from the fallopian tube into the uterus. The nidation of the embryo called blastocyst at this stage of development, with the beginning of the production of hCG marks the beginning of a pregnancy. Without contraceptives, during a woman's fertile days, there is a relatively high probability that conception will follow.

The vast majority of humans are conceived through penile–vaginal intercourse. Since the birth of the first child conceived via in vitro fertilization in 1978, an estimated 13–17 million infants have been born worldwide through assisted reproductive technology (ART). Given a global population of approximately 8 billion, ART-conceived individuals represent roughly 0.2% of the world's population. Consequently, more than 99% of people alive today were conceived through penile–vaginal intercourse.

For people who do not want (another) child, contraception has made it possible to separate vaginal intercourse from its biological function of procreation. Worldwide, about 57 per cent of couples with women of reproductive age use modern methods of contraception.

Since there is no mating season (estrus) in humans, the partners can have penile–vaginal intercourse distributed over the menstrual cycle regardless of the time of ovulation, even when the woman is already pregnant and after the menopause. The principles of safer sex eliminate the reproductive function. Couples who wish to have offspring can avail themselves of the tests for sexually transmitted infections recommended by the WHO, so that after ruling out or treating any detected infection, they can have penile–vaginal intercourse without using a condom.

== Legal situation ==
Vaginal intercourse between private individuals is part of their private sphere. Sexual intercourse between an adult and a young person is generally only permitted after the age of consent in the respective country has been reached, though some countries/jurisdictions have special exceptions to this rule. These exceptions may include when the minor is legally married to the adult or within no more than a specified age gap with the adult. Nowadays, intimate intercourse between unmarried teenagers is permitted and common in many countries. Lack of sexual education about contraception often leads to teenage pregnancy. In many countries, after marriage, the first cohabitation is considered a (sexual) "consummation of marriage". In every country of the world, vaginal intercourse performed without the consent of the other person constitutes rape.

== Psychological aspects ==
A desire for pleasure is a natural motivation for sex in general. Human intimacy favours a pleasurable experience. For people who prefer non-committal sex, emotional closeness plays a lesser role. In studies consensual vaginal intercourse has been associated with signs of better physiological and psychological functions. In women, regular orgasms during vaginal sex correlate positively with passion, love and relationship quality.

In experimental studies with men and women whose hormone levels were examined, one having vaginal intercourse and the other self-pleasuring to orgasm, it was found that in both sexes the increase in prolactin was 400% higher after vaginal intercourse than after masturbation. This is interpreted to mean that vaginal intercourse is physiologically more satisfying. In satisfying relationships, positive effects on health and well-being have been proven. One study (2012) showed a stress reduction effect for both partners in satisfying relationships, but not in unsatisfactory relationships. As preliminary for the natural procreation of a new human being, for females, penile–vaginal intercourse is connected with various attributes like psychological and sacramental aspects beyond the reproductive function. Sometimes sex is also driven by motives like to degrade, to punish, or to overcome loneliness and boredom.

In 2006, the WHO reported a worldwide prevalence of between 8% and 21.1% of painful vaginal sex for women. In a U.S. study, about 30% of women and 7% of men reported pain, for most, only mild and of short duration. This study found that a large percentage of Americans do not talk about the pain with their partner. In a Swedish study of young women aged 18 to 22, as many as 47% reported pain, but they said they did not want to interrupt the sex act. Some pretended to enjoy it instead of giving the man any feedback. The most common reason was that they put the man's pleasure above their own and tended toward submissiveness during sex. Data from an online survey in the United States suggest that a proportion of men engage in sexual behaviours described as dominant and purposeful, in which they mimic behaviors seen in porn. Unless a woman's pain has a physical cause, it is often related to impatient partner action or lack of open communication. The prevention of sexual disappointment and dyspareunia caused by the behaviour of the male partner is summarized by Betty Dodson in the following words:

It's a pleasure to be with a man who is self-assured, confident in his ability to get erect and maintain his erection long enough to enjoy the dance of erotic love. If he's not a cocksman, he has mastered oral and manual skills. He has a sensitive touch and never hesitates to ask how I like my clitoris touched. He is never in a hurry. Before touching my clitoris, he always applies some kind of lubrication. When entering my vagina, he savours slow penetration.

== Description ==
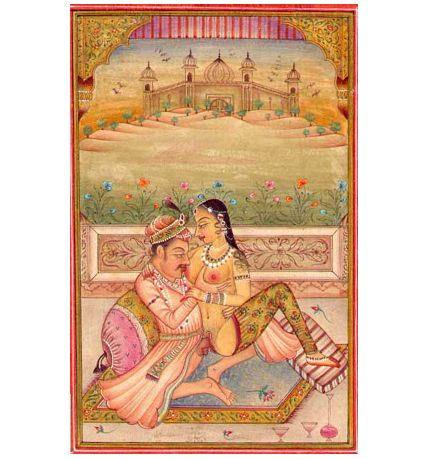
Painting from the Kamasutra depicting coitus with nipple stimulation

In all mammals including humans, penile penetration of the vagina is an instinctual behaviour serving the continuation of the species. In humans, learned behaviour also plays an important role (sexual scripts). From Shere Hite, there is the suggestion to define onset not by penetration, but by the covering of the vulva by the penis.

Preparation for vaginal coitus usually involves foreplay in the form of various combinations of caresses, petting, manual sex, oral sex. For the woman, physical sexual arousal and clitoral erection resulting from the foreplay are the prerequisites for the reaction of the intravaginal G-spot.

The sex positions, the pelvic movements of the woman and the man, how slowly or quickly they are performed, and the lesser or greater depth influence the two arousal curves. Duration can be influenced by positions, gentle or stronger movements, and by touching erogenous zones with the hands. The needs for movements are individually different for both women and men. For women, pelvic floor training and active movements of their pelvis during vaginal intercourse increase the chance of orgasm. A man's arousal curve usually rises faster, while women need plenty of time. According to an investigation of 2005 the time from penile insertion to male orgasm, the intravaginal ejaculation latency time (IELT), varies between 0.55 and 44.1 minutes. Sexually experienced men use delaying techniques to give their female partner the time she needs. Most men can learn to intentionally delay their own arousal and orgasm by practicing this doing masturbation.

The reason why men are faster in achieving orgasm is that the glans penis is constantly enveloped by the vagina; it is continuously stimulated, making it likely that moving it in and out repeatedly will cause him to have an orgasm relatively soon. In women, the glans clitoridis lies at a distance to the vaginal entrance, often without physical contact.

The clitoral glans has an essential function in triggering sexual arousal and then orgasm, For many women, the movement of the penis in the vagina causes only a limited increase in their arousal. Many women reach orgasm when both the extragenital parts of the clitoris and the erogenous zones inside the vagina are continuously stimulated simultaneously for long enough. Sexual arousal can increase to the point where one or both partners experience an orgasm either in succession or simultaneously. The hypothesis of two modes of female orgasm – vaginal or clitoral – is not tenable. Rather, it is a complex reaction in which all organ systems of the human body are involved. Without clitoral stimulation, 23.3% of women reach orgasm during vaginal intercourse, with simultaneous clitoral stimulation 74%.

When the man is sitting upright with the woman sitting on his lap, she can rub her clitoris against his pubic bone. In lateral coital position, there are also possibilities for clitoral stimulation while the penis is moving inside. In the flanquette position, the man can give some pressure with his thigh to her mons pubis and the clitoral glans.

Another variation of vaginal sex is with lesbians who use a single or double-sided dildo.

== Injury risks ==
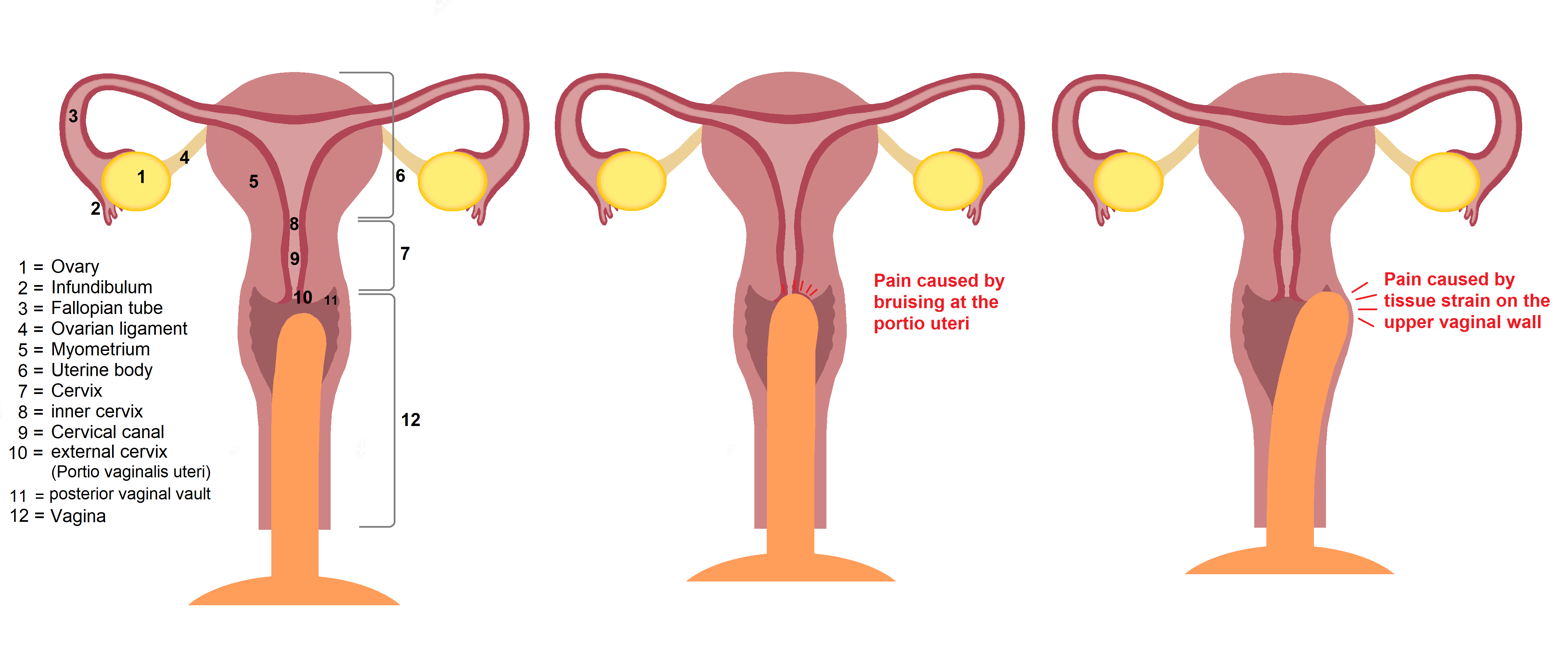
The vagina becomes wider and longer when the woman is sexually aroused. In the absence of arousal, even a penis that is not particularly large can bump at the cervix or into the vaginal fornix, causing pain.

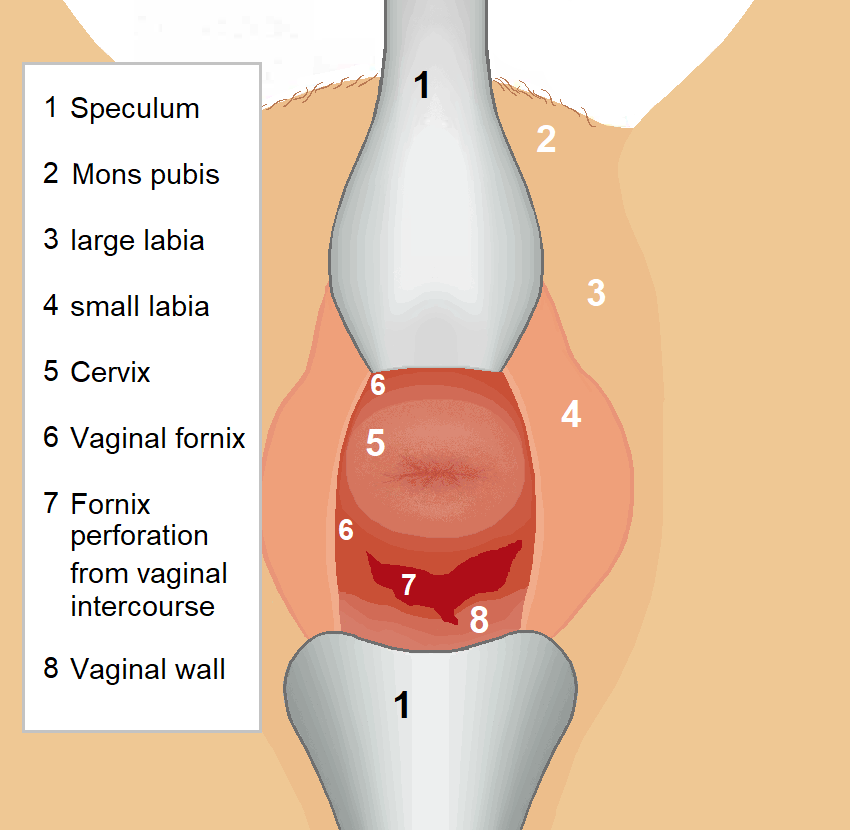
Injury of the vaginal fornix by too-rough and too-deep penile penetration

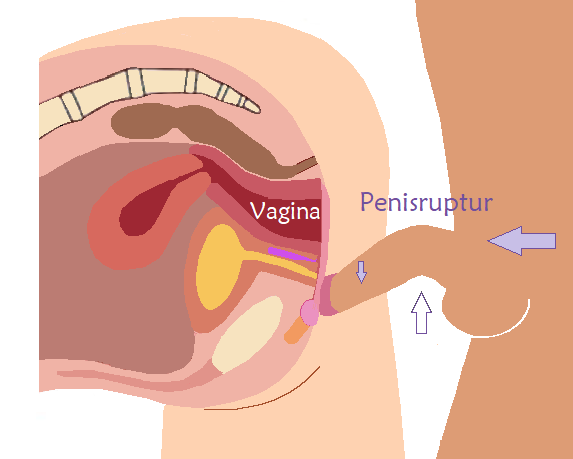
Risk of penile injury during doggy style

In a woman with an intact moist vaginal mucosa, friction by the penis is painless. In case of insufficient vaginal lubrication or excessive temporal extension of the coitus, the mucous membranes may become sore due to mechanical irritation. If sand gets into the vagina on a beach or in an unclean dwelling, small abrasions occur in the vagina and on the glans penis. A vaginal douche has physiological disadvantages. The sand is excreted by the natural self-cleaning of the mucous membrane.

The length of the stretched vagina varies from person to person. The mean value is 13±3 cm which corresponds to the average length of the human penis. At rest, the vagina is considerably shorter. In a study from 1993, the mean value was given as 9.2 cm, in a study from 2006, only 6.27 cm with a variation of the lengths between 4.1 and 9.5 cm. If the woman is not sufficiently aroused with a deep penetration, the penis bumps against the cervix, causing pain. If the stretching capacity of the vagina is exceeded by a too large penis, pain and inflammation will result. The same problem can occur with a relatively short vagina. The remedy in both situations is to be mindful of the time for clitoral stimulation by foreplay and to avoid penetrating too deeply. A comparative study between women who had consensual vaginal sex and victims of rape found that in consensual sex, 6.9 percent of women had genital injuries. Among women who were raped, 22.8 percent suffered genital injuries.

In men, there is a risk of penile rupture if the penis is bent when erect. This is a case of medical emergency. According to studies (2017 and 2022), accidents in which the man suffers a penile fracture occur predominantly in the doggy style position, but a careless movement by the woman on top can also inflict such a serious injury on the man. One of the causes is the penis slipping out of the vagina and, during the next thrusting movement, forcefully hitting an area of the vulva under which her pubis bone and the pubic symphysis are, causing the penis to suddenly bend downwards. In the missionary position, such accidents are rare. Unsuitable angles and changes of position of one or both partners can also lead to severe misalignment of the penile corpus cavernosum and thus to a penile rupture.

== Partnering techniques preferred by women ==
In 2021, a study of 3017 American women identified the ways women have discovered to make vaginal sex with a male partner more pleasurable and arousing for themselves.

- "Angling": 87.5% of women find it pleasurable to circle their pelvis or lift and lower it to control where the penis pushes or rubs and how it feels.

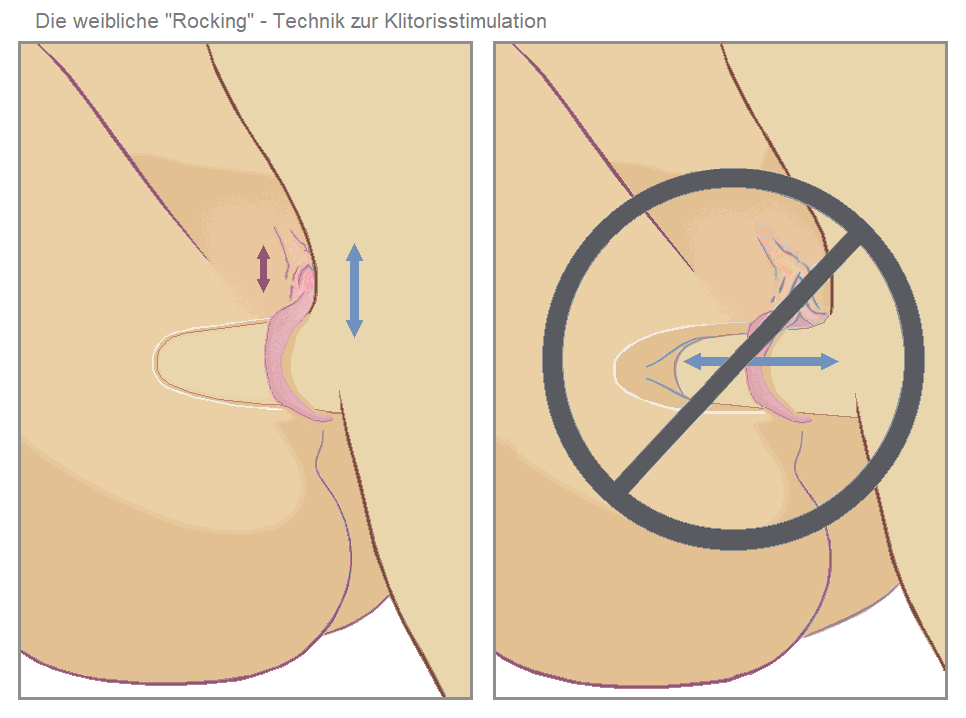
Rocking

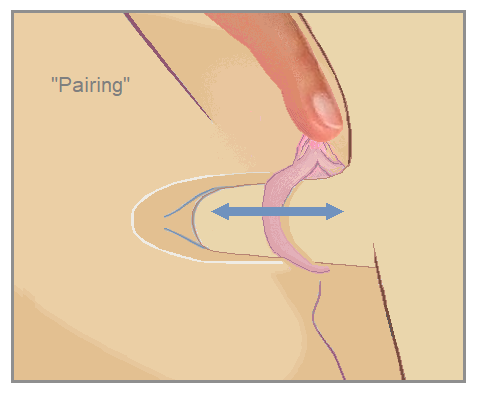
Pairing

- "Rocking": 76% of women find it sexually arousing to have the penis constantly deep inside the vagina without any long in and out movements and to rub their clitoral glans against the base of the penis.
- "Shallowing": 84% of women enjoy and respond to "shallow" penetration, i.e., when the tip of the penis moves only in the front part of the vagina (G-spot), but not on the outside or deep inside.
- "Pairing": 69.7% of women are most likely to reach orgasm during vaginal intercourse when they or their partner stimulates their clitoris with a finger or vibrator or Hitachi Magic Wand simultaneously.

The knowledge of such techniques enables women to communicate their preferences to their partners. Pairing has been tested successfully since the 1970s by Betty Dodson in her coachings for women suffering from anorgasmia by using a dildo to penetrate the vagina and a vibrator to place next to the clitoral glans. The other techniques were also part of her coaching for women who wished to experience orgasm during vaginal intercourse as much as their partner.

== Physical conditions ==
Menstrual cramps, hygienic, religious, or cultural reasons may condition abstinence during menstruation. A necessity for painless intimate intercourse is vaginal lubrication. In women with vaginal aplasia, a neovagina can be surgically created by vaginoplasty. In men, the prerequisite is a painless penis and the ability to have an erection.

An investigation by the Charité Berlin (2002) found that, for women, the partner's smell had the first effect on stimulating or inhibiting pleasure, followed by mood, personal hygiene, clitoral stimulation and safety from disease. Attractiveness and penis length played a subordinate role. Women generally respond more to olfactory perception, men more to visual perceptions.

A variety of factors can lead to discomfort or pain (see dyspareunia). Specialists in gynaecology are responsible for treatment in women; specialists in urology and dermatology are responsible for treatment in men.

For people with physical impairments (disability), sex positions that do not cause discomfort are usually possible. In a study of patients with chronic lumbar spine pain, 81 percent complained of sexual problems, and 66 percent never talked about the issue with their physician.

== See also ==
- Sexual and reproductive health
- Sex education
- Safe sex
