= Dominant position =

A dominant position may refer to:

- Dominant position in grappling
- Dominant male sex position
- Dominant female sex position
- Dominance (economics), the firm's dominant position in the market
