= Pompoir =

Sexual intercourse technique

Pompoir (/pɒmˈpwɑːr/ POM-PWAR), also known as the Singapore grip, is an ancient sexual technique in which a female sexual partner uses their pelvic floor muscles, particularly the pubococcygeus muscle of the levator ani, to rhythmically stimulate a penis while both partners remain still. The practice emphasizes internal vaginal control to massage the penis with subtle, wave-like contractions, usually performed by a female on top.

The term pompoir is the French transliteration of the Tamil city name "Pahmpur". Originating over 3,000 years ago in India, the practice was performed by Devadasis, female temple attendants skilled in dance and sexual techniques. It spread throughout Asia, particularly among elite escort communities, and was refined in regions like Thailand and Japan.

To understand the mechanics of pompoir, a distinction must be made between the involuntary and voluntary muscle layers that comprise the vagina. The vaginal wall contains a tunica muscularis composed of two layers of smooth muscle, an inner circular layer and an outer longitudinal layer, which are under the control of the autonomic nervous system and cannot be conscientiously activated. The contraction of the involuntary longitudinal muscles shortens and widens the canal, while the contraction of the circular muscles constricts it.

Pompoir relies entirely on the conscious manipulation of the skeletal muscles of the vaginal support structures. These striated muscles can be divided into three distinct functional groups. The first and most superficial group includes the bulbospongiosus and ischiocavernosus muscles, which directly encircle the vaginal introitus and can be contracted voluntarily. The second group comprises the superficial and deep transverse perineal muscles, which support the perineum and run from the ischial tuberosities to the perineal body just behind the vagina. The third and deepest group consists primarily of the levator ani, a collection of muscles that forms the pelvic floor.

== Pompoir vs Kegels ==
Basic Pompoir moves: Pulling and Pushing

A similar exercise, known as "Kegel", was developed in the 1950s by gynecologist Arnold Kegel. In 1952, he created exercises specifically designed for women experiencing urinary incontinence. While Pompoir targets the same muscle group, its primary focus is sexual mastery and pleasure.

Pompoir involves more specific control than traditional Kegel contractions, incorporating three primary motions:

- Pulling ↑ - Performed with the inner pull of the back vaginal wall, the same as a Kegel contraction, driven by the levator ani.
- Pushing ↓ - Release of the front vaginal wall to create a downward pressure (unique to Pompoir), driven by the diaphragm.
- Squeezing )( - Uses the side vaginal walls to tighten around the penis (advanced Pompoir move), driven by the bulbospongiosus muscle.

== Techniques ==
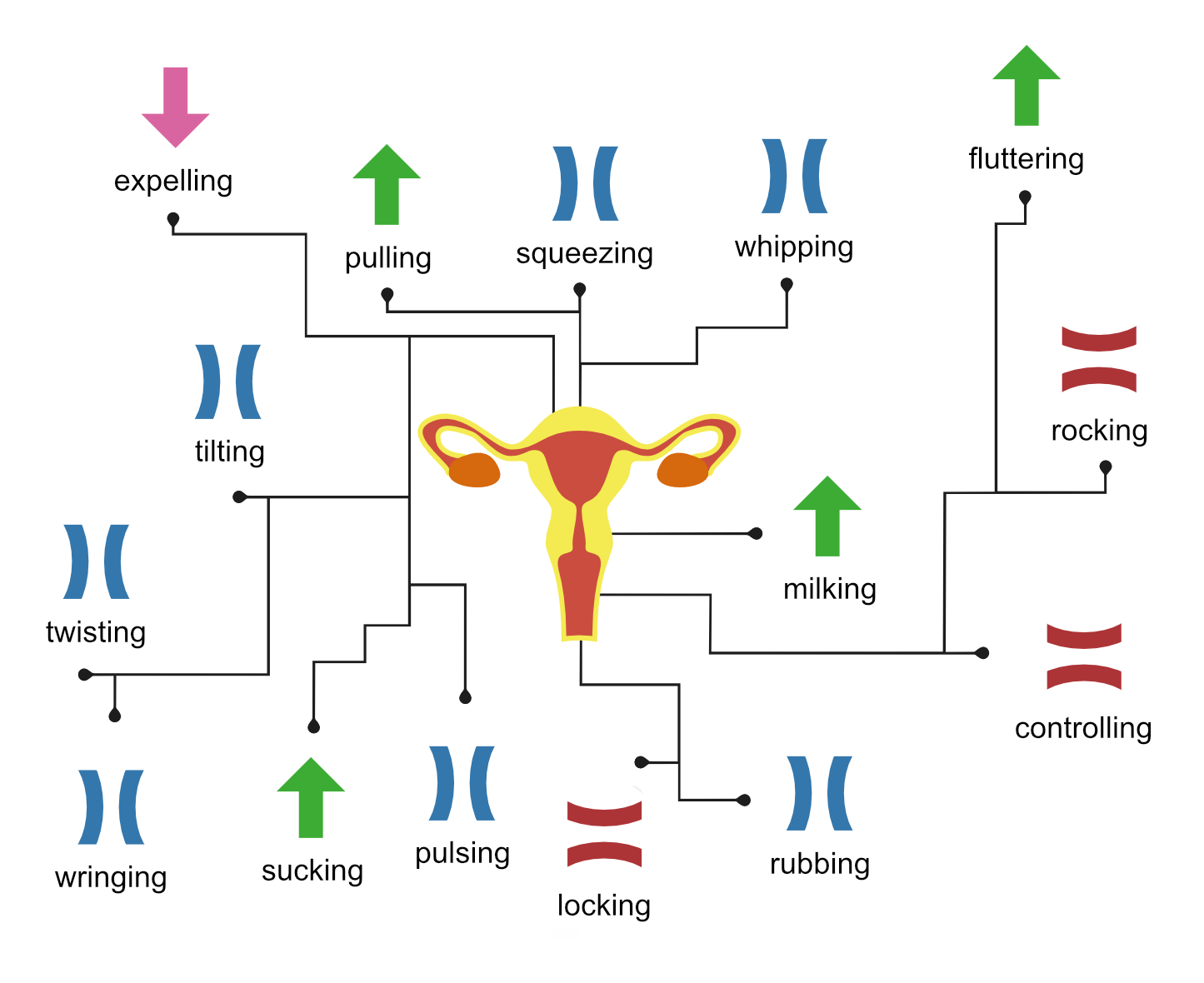
Pompoir techniques

The pompoir techniques are a combination of the advanced and basic moves:

- Sucking - sucking the penis into the vagina after only the glans has been inserted.
- Strangulation - squeezing the base of the glans penis with one of the three vaginal muscle rings.
- Expelling - to force the shaft of the penis out of the vagina leaving only the glans inside.
- Milking - massaging the penis in a manner reminiscent of milking, always using the vaginal muscle rings.
- Twisting - squeezing and turning the penis with the above mentioned vaginal rings.
- Locking - contract the vaginal muscles in order to prevent and block the advancement of the penis into the vagina.

== Benefits ==
- Increased sexual pleasure: Muscle control allows for more intense and varied orgasms, including vaginal, G-spot, cervical, and uterine orgasms (according to anecdotal reports).
- Improved pelvic floor health: Can help combat urinary incontinence and facilitate childbirth by strengthening the pubococcygeus muscles.
- Sexual empowerment: Gives the woman greater control during intercourse, reversing traditional power dynamics.

Although pompoir offers many benefits, it should be practiced under the guidance of a pelvic floor specialist. Overtraining or performing these exercises excessively can increase the risk of incontinence or uterine prolapse in some women.

== Curiosities ==
There is a variant called Kabzah or "Kabza" (Hindi: कब्ज़ा, Urdu: قبضہ, Arabic قبضة), originating from South Asia, in which the woman also uses abdominal muscle contractions to stimulate the partner, who must remain completely passive. The term translates as "holder," and the sensation is likened to "milking." Women reportedly spend years training to master this technique, which is considered highly difficult and is associated with tantric practices to prolong and intensify intercourse.

The title of The Singapore Grip, a novel by J. G. Farrell, as well as its 2020 television adaptation, refers to pompoir. This technique is said to have been practiced by historical figures such as Cleopatra and Wallis Simpson.
