= Kegel exercise =

Pelvic floor exercise

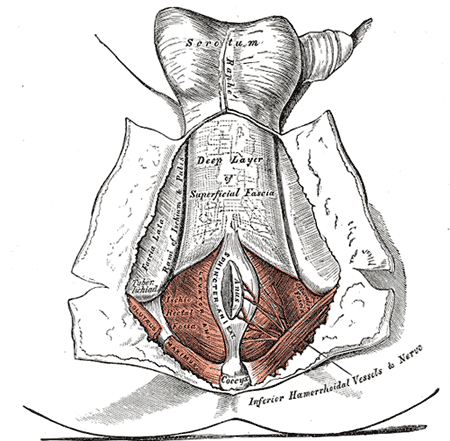
- Muscles of the male perineum
- Pronunciation: Kegel: /ˈkeɪɡəl, kiː-/
- Other names: pelvic muscles exercise

Kegel exercise, also known as pelvic floor exercise, involves repeatedly contracting and relaxing the muscles that form part of the pelvic floor, also sometimes colloquially referred to as the "Kegel muscles". The exercise can be performed many times a day, for several minutes at a time, but takes one to three months to begin to have an effect.

Kegel exercises aim to strengthen the pelvic floor muscles. These muscles have many functions within the human body. In women, they are responsible for holding up the bladder, preventing urinary stress incontinence (especially after childbirth), vaginal and uterine prolapse. In men, these muscles are responsible for urinary continence, fecal continence, and ejaculation. Several tools exist to help with these exercises, although various studies debate the relative effectiveness of different tools versus traditional exercises.

The American gynecologist Arnold Kegel published a description of such exercises in 1948, but they had previously been published in 1936 by a woman, Margaret Morris, who was given little credit at the time.

== Mechanism of action ==
Kegel exercises aim to improve muscle tone by strengthening the pubococcygeus muscles of the pelvic floor. Kegel exercises are commonly prescribed for pregnant women to prepare the pelvic floor for physiological stresses of the later stages of pregnancy and childbirth. Various advisors recommend Kegel exercises for treating vaginal prolapse and preventing uterine prolapse in women and for treating prostate pain and swelling resulting from benign prostatic hyperplasia (BPH) and prostatitis in men. Kegel exercises may have benefits in treating urinary incontinence in both men and women. Kegel exercises may also increase sexual gratification, allowing women to complete pompoir and aiding men in reducing premature ejaculation. The many actions performed by Kegel muscles include holding in urine and avoiding defecation. Reproducing this type of muscle action can strengthen the Kegel muscles. The action of slowing or stopping the flow of urine may be used as a test of the correct pelvic-floor exercise technique.

The components of levator ani (the pelvic diaphragm), namely pubococcygeus, puborectalis, and iliococcygeus, contract and relax as one muscle. Hence pelvic-floor exercises involve the entire levator ani rather than pubococcygeus alone. Pelvic floor exercises may help in cases of fecal incontinence and pelvic organ prolapse, such as rectal prolapse.

== Health effects ==
=== Women ===
Factors such as pregnancy, childbirth, aging, and being overweight often weaken the pelvic muscles. This can be assessed by either digital examination of vaginal pressure or using a Kegel perineometer. Kegel exercises are useful in regaining pelvic floor muscle strength in such cases.

The symptoms of prolapse and its severity can be decreased with pelvic floor exercises. Effectiveness can be improved with feedback on how to do the exercises.

=== Men ===
Kegel exercises can train the perineal muscles by increasing the oxygen supply and the strength of those muscles. The names of the perineal muscles are: ischiocavernosus (erection), bulbocavernosus (ejaculation), external sphincter of the anus, striated urethral sphincter, transverse perineal, levator of the prostate, and puborectalis.

Premature ejaculation is defined as when male ejaculation occurs after less than one minute of penetration. The perineal muscles are involved in ejaculation when they are involuntarily contracted. The ischiocavernosus muscle is responsible for male erection, and the bulbocavernosus muscle is responsible for ejaculation. By actively contracting the perineal muscles with Kegel exercises regularly, strength and control of these muscles increase, possibly aiding in the avoidance of premature ejaculation.

=== Urinary incontinence ===
Pelvic floor exercises (muscle training) can be included in conservative treatment approaches for women with urinary incontinence. There is tentative evidence that biofeedback may give added benefit when used with pelvic floor muscle training (PFMT). There is no clear evidence that teaching pelvic floor exercises alters the risk of stress urinary incontinence in men who develop this condition post prostatectomy.

In pregnant women, antenatal PFMT probably helps prevent urinary incontinence during pregnancy and up to six months after giving birth, but for pregnant women who already have incontinence, it is not clear if antenatal PFMT helps to reduce symptoms.

=== Fecal incontinence ===
In pregnancy, it is not yet clear if antenatal PFMT helps to prevent or treat fecal incontinence.

== Pelvic toning devices ==
Some devices, marketed to women, are for exercising the pelvic floor muscles and to improve the muscle tone of the pubococcygeal or vaginal muscle.

As of 2013, there was no evidence that doing pelvic floor exercise with weights worked better than doing Kegel exercises without weights; there is greater risk with weights, because a foreign object is introduced into the vagina.

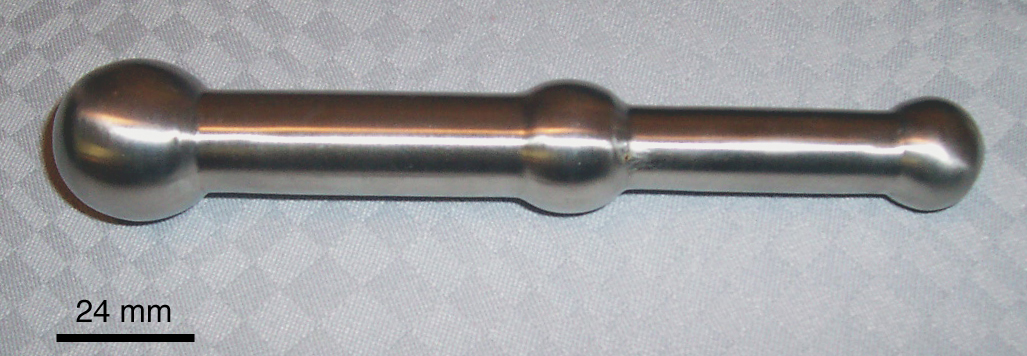
A Kegel exerciser

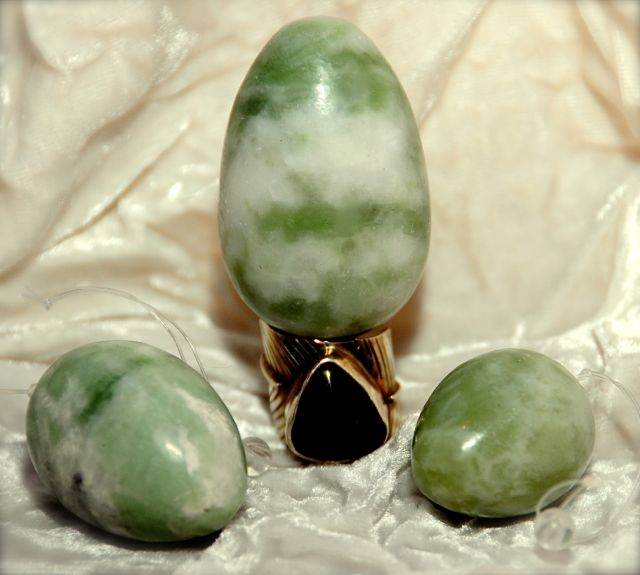
Jade eggs (or Yoni eggs) have been marketed for use in vaginal weightlifting.

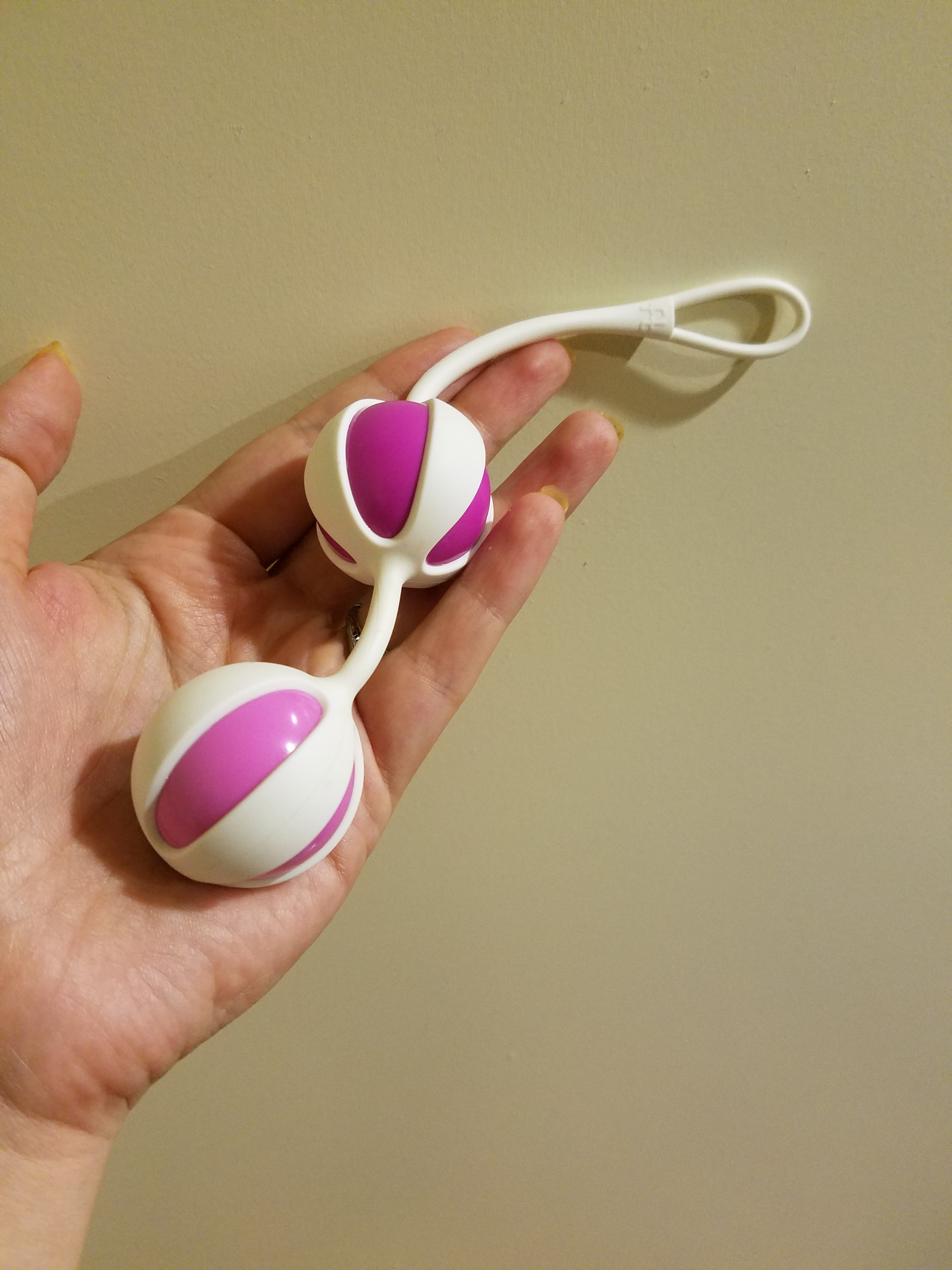
Ben wa balls

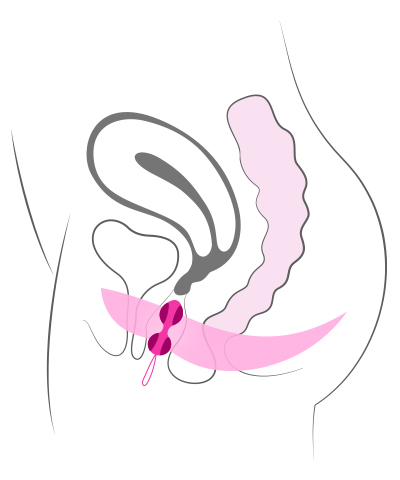
"Geisha balls" in the vagina on the level of the PC muscle

=== Marketing ===
During the latter part of the 20th century, several medical and pseudo-medical devices were marketed to consumers as improving sexual performance or orgasms, increasing "energy", "balancing hormones", and as having other health or lifestyle benefits. There is no evidence for any of these claims, and many of them are pseudoscience.

== See also ==
- Pelvic floor physical therapy
- Taoist sexual practices
- Vacuum exercise
- Vaginal steaming
- Bandha (yoga)#Mula bandha
