= Ben Wa balls =

Small, marble-sized balls intended for insertion into the vagina

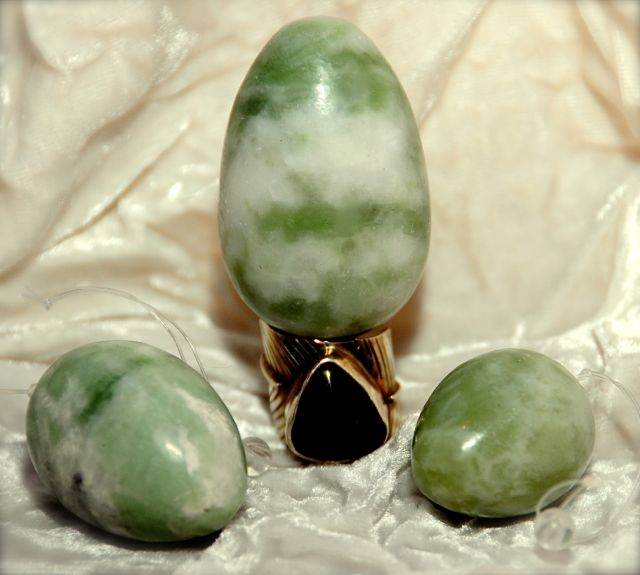
Ben wa eggs traditional form, without a ribbon

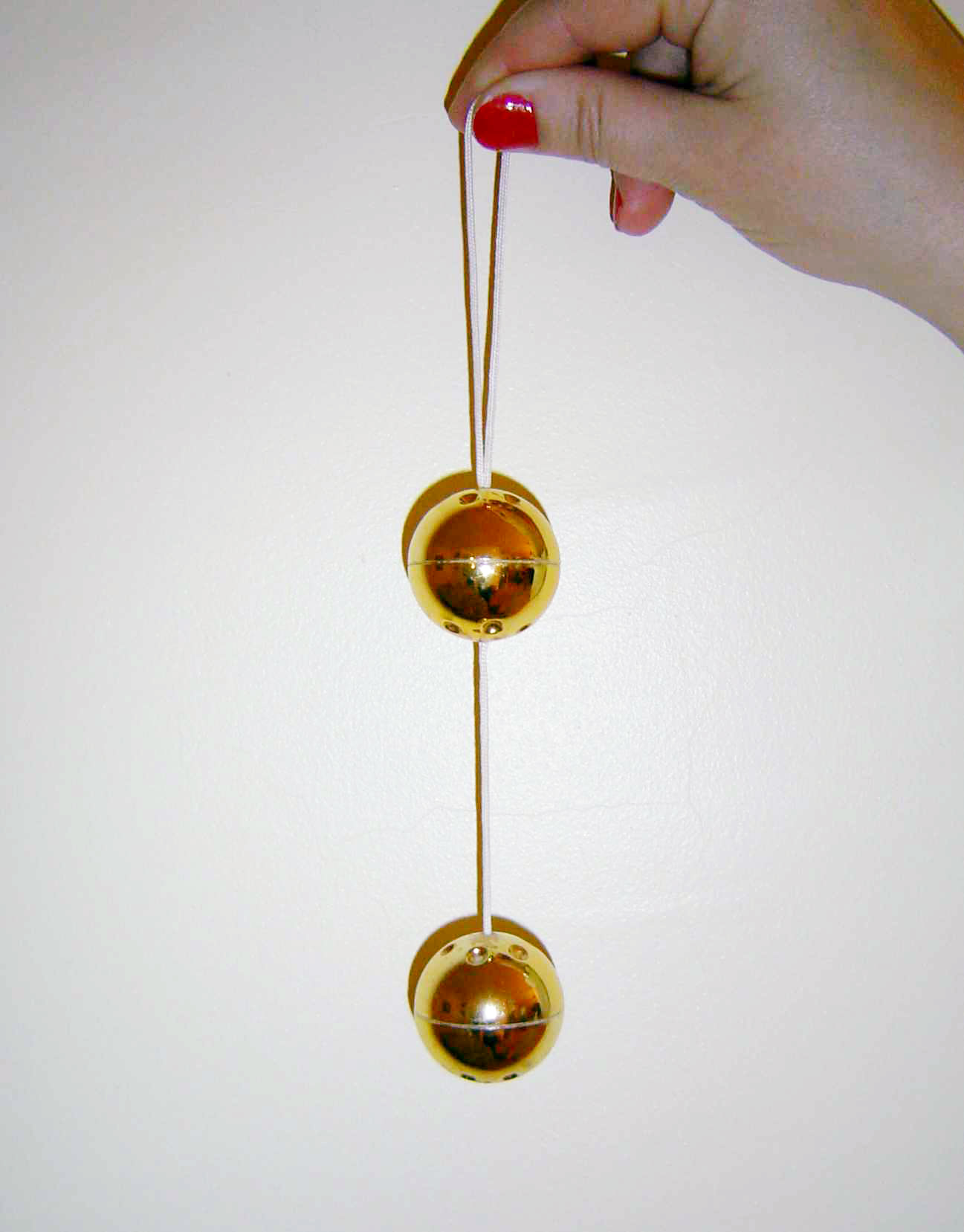
Gold-toned rin-no-tama balls, attached to a ribbon

Ben Wa balls (Chinese: 阴道球; pinyin: yīndàoqiú; lit. 'vagina balls' or Chinese: 内用球; pinyin: nèiyòngqiú; lit. 'internal use balls'), also known as orgasm balls, jade balls (Japanese: 琳の玉, romanized: rin-no-tama), Venus balls, or mien-ling, are marble-sized balls, usually hollow and containing a small weight, that may be inserted into a vagina and held in place by the pubococcygeus muscles. They may be used as a sex toy by creating sexual stimulation or pleasure by rolling around in the vagina stimulating movement and/or vibration. They create a subtle stimulation that does not bring the user to immediate orgasm but rather teases.

They may also be used for a medical purpose, such as to increase the strength of the pelvic floor muscles, much as Taoist sexual practices have been used for centuries and the Kegel exercises are used today. Similar to Kegel exercises, Ben Wa balls and other shaped vaginal weightlifting equipment are recommended by gynecologists and obstetricians to increase vaginal elasticity and bladder control.

It is possible to leave the balls in place in the vagina all day or use them while seated in a rocking chair. Health experts caution against prolonged placement of foreign objects in the vagina due to the risk of infection, however.

== Description ==
The balls are available in a variety of forms, and may be solid, or contain clappers or chimes within. Other, larger versions made of plastic encasing lesser balls are called Duotone balls. The balls sometimes comprise multiple metal covered balls linked by either a chain or silk string for easy removal, but they do not have an adequately flared base for safe anal play. The balls should not be confused with anal kegel exercisers and prostate stimulators.

== See also ==
- Baoding balls
- Kegel exercise
