= Perineometer =

Instrument for measuring the strength of voluntary contractions of pelvic floor muscles

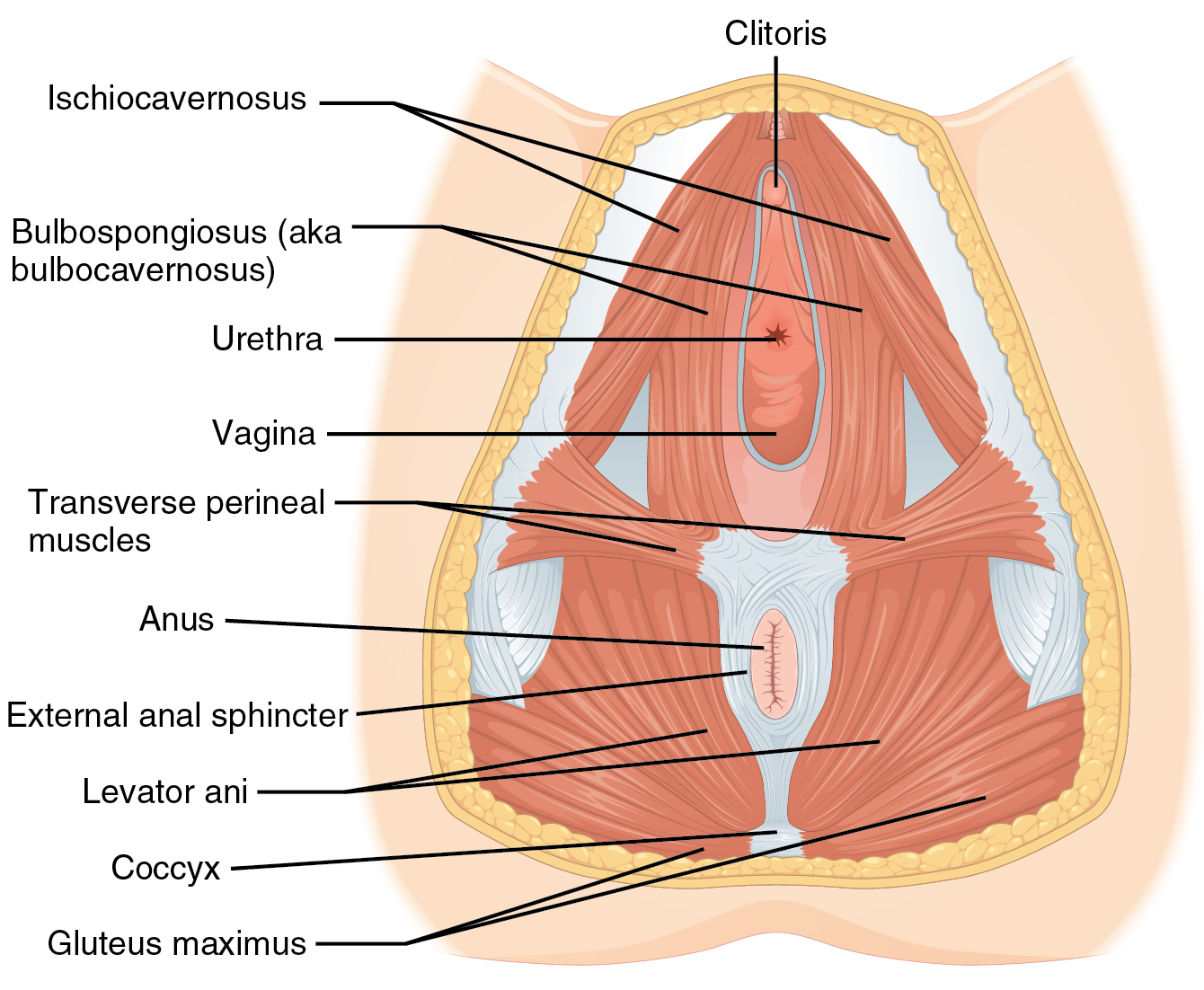
The muscles of the female perineum. Pelvic floor muscles may be damaged in childbirth, the severity of which may be assessed using a perineometer

A Kegel perineometer or vaginal manometer is an instrument for measuring the strength of voluntary contractions of the pelvic floor muscles. Arnold Kegel (1894–1972) was the gynecologist who invented the Kegel perineometer (used for measuring vaginal air pressure) and Kegel exercises (squeezing of the muscles of the pelvic floor). This followed the observation that muscles of the pelvic floor inevitably weakened following the trauma of childbirth. Ascertaining the air pressure inside the vagina by insertion of a perineometer, while requesting the woman to squeeze as hard as possible, indicates whether or not she would benefit from strengthening the vaginal muscles using the Kegel exercises. More modern electromyograph (EMG) perineometers, which measure electrical activity in the pelvic floor muscles, may be more effective in this purpose. Assessment of pelvic floor strength during gynaecological examination may help to identify women with fascial defects of the pelvic floor, as well as those at risk of genital prolapse or urinary incontinence. Both the Kegel perineometer and a digital examination are effective and concordant in their results in this assessment. Based on his experience with perineometry, sexologist Karl F. Stifter developed the internationally patented pelvic floor trainer COME in 2005

== See also ==
- Perineal tear classification
