= Vacuum exercise =

Body Building

The vacuum exercise is an exercise which involves contracting some internal abdominal muscles, primarily the transverse abdominal muscle, and not as much the diaphragm.

Repetitions of the exercise may be used as a form of aerobic exercise, and light strength training. There is difficulty building strength in the muscle, as it is not easy to apply resistance training to the deeper internal muscles.

== Purpose ==
The reasons for performing this exercise vary. It has been done for aesthetic purposes in bodybuilding competitions (to suck the abdomen in, making it appear less bulgy). It can be done to enhance overall core stability and strength. It is used in belly dance to actively perform flutters, engaging various fibres in the muscle selectively. Some believe the pressures it exerts upon the intestines are an aid to digestion. It is used in Taoist reverse breathing.

People may also sometimes contract these muscles in public to reduce the appearance of their abdomen, consciously or unconsciously. "Sucking in" the stomach to appear thinner may be most common form of this exercise, but with little of the intensity or long-term purpose of the other forms.

== Performing a vacuum ==
In performing a vacuum (activating the transverse abdominis), one draws one's bellybutton inward, toward the spine. Some perform a vacuum in conjunction with bending over, reaching overhead, or when lifting heavy weights, although the benefit and healthiness of this is disputed (some advocated just tensing the midsection, with primary focus more so on the lower back). Increasing the range of motion (how far it is drawn in), the intensity (very little can be done, other than resisting gravity) or the duration are the methods of making the muscles stronger.

Performing flutters or Tabata intervals of high intensity and rest similar to Kegel exercises is also common. It may also be possible to vary the pressures by contorting the body or exerting various pressures on tissues connected to the transversus abdominis, although how this might be done is currently unknown.

== String method ==
A method of developing long-term daily endurance in the muscles is to tie a string around the waist at the navel level. The string is tied at 3/4 of one's maximum vacuum point. The string should be tight, but not noticeably cutting into the skin. When the transverse abdominis relaxes, the abdominal wall (belly) expands and the string will tighten for immediate feedback, reminding the user to contract the transverse abdominal muscle.

== Hypopressive exercises ==
Hypopressive exercises also involve the transverse abdominal, but they are based upon reflex contraction of the abdominal wall, rather than voluntary contractions that are a feature of traditional abdominal exercises. The significance of this is thought to be that hypopressive exercises increase the base tone of the abdominal wall (as well as the pelvic floor) and hence reduce resting waist circumference.

== See also ==
- Exercise bulimia
- Exercise paradox
- Uddiyana bandha
