= Coital alignment technique =

Sex position designed to maximize clitoral stimulation

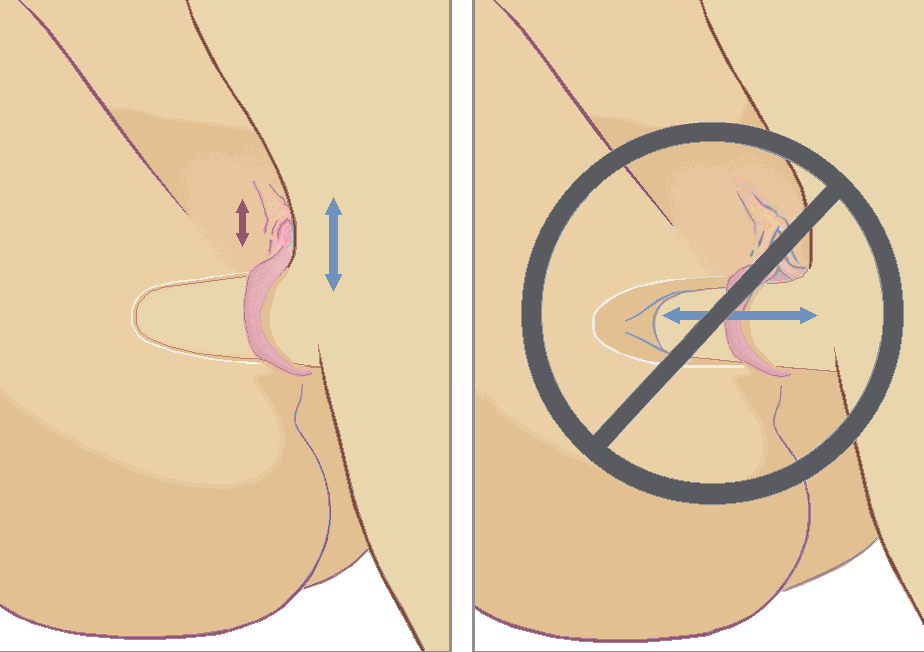
Coital alignment technique

The coital alignment technique sex position is used primarily as a variant of the missionary position and is designed to maximize clitoral stimulation during sexual intercourse. This is achieved by combining the "riding high" variation of the missionary position with pressure-counterpressure movements performed by each partner in rhythm with coitus.

== Technique ==
When used as a variant of the missionary position, the male lies above the female but moves upward along the woman's body, until his erection, which would otherwise point "up," is pointing "down", with the dorsal side of the penis pressing against the clitoris. By adopting this ‘pelvic-override’ position, the male achieves a fundamental genital 'circuitry': vaginal penetration in coitus with constant direct contact between the base of the penis and the clitoris.

The partners then maintain their genital contact by coordinating their sexual movement. Instead of engaging in the familiar 'in and out' motion of coital thrusting, the partners hold their penile-clitoral connection together by simultaneously exerting genital pressure and counterpressure in a rocking or grinding motion. As opposed to the missionary position, the male's body moves downward (relative to the female's) during the inward stroke, and upward for the outward stroke. Sexual movement is focused in the pelvises, without leverage from the arms or legs.

The male leads the downward stroke and the female the upward stroke, with the partner who is moving the pelvis backward exerting a slight but firm counterpressure. The female may also wrap her legs around the male. The rocking downward and upward sexual movement builds arousal that the partners let develop and peak naturally.

The woman on top variant is known as the reverse coital alignment technique.

== History of studies ==
The technique for coital alignment was first defined by American psychotherapist Edward Eichel, and the original study was published by Eichel, De Simone Eichel, and Kule in 1988 in the Journal of Sex & Marital Therapy.

Since then, the topic has been studied several times in the same journal. A 1992 report by Kaplan and her sex therapist trainees described the team's cursory trial of the coital alignment technique (CAT), acknowledging that they may have resorted to old routines after only a few attempts out of fear of disappointing their partners. Their call for other sex therapists to give the technique more rigorous testing instigated a series of controlled studies by Hurlbert and colleagues reporting statistically significant results in the treatment of female hypoactive sexual desire.

In 2005, Eichel asserted that "the three classic problems of sexual 'dysfunction' have been redefined as interdependent parts of ONE behavioral syndrome - the problems are NOT 'diseases'[…] [t]he 'cure' is a fundamental change in sexual technique". In his concluding paragraph, Eichel wrote that "[t]he CAT model provides a fundamental matrix for the analysis of classic sex problems and other subtle, but widespread, sex-related health problems."
