= Arnold Kegel =

American gynecologist (1894–1972)

Arnold H. Kegel
- Born: February 21, 1894; Lansing, Iowa, US
- Died: 1 March 1972 (aged 78)
- Education: Loyola Univ. Chicago (M.D.); Dubuque Presbyterian (B.A.)
- Known for: Kegel exercise
- Scientific career
- Fields: Gynecology
- Workplaces: Keck School of Medicine of USC

Arnold Henry Kegel (/ˈkeɪɡəl/; February 21, 1894 – March 1, 1972) was an American gynecologist who invented the Kegel perineometer (an instrument for measuring the strength of voluntary contractions of the pelvic floor muscles) and Kegel exercises (squeezing of the muscles of the pelvic floor) as non-surgical treatment of urinary incontinence from perineal muscle weakness and/or laxity. Pelvic floor exercises are considered first-line treatment for urinary stress incontinence and any type of female incontinence and female genital prolapse, with evidence supporting its use from systematic reviews of randomized trials in the Cochrane Library amongst others. Kegel first published his ideas in 1948. He was an assistant professor of gynecology at the Keck School of Medicine of USC.
