= Vaginal fornix =

Superior portions of the vagina

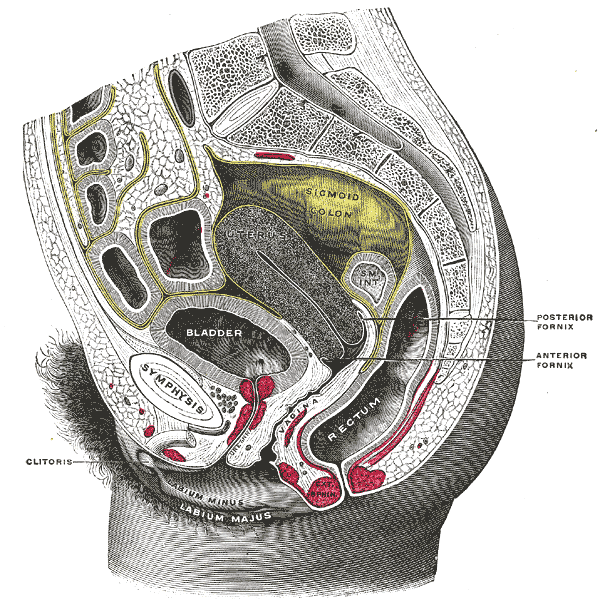
- Sagittal section of the lower part of a female trunk, right segment (SM. INT. = small intestine)

Details

Identifiers
- Latin: fornix vaginae
- TA98: A09.1.04.002
- TA2: 3524
- FMA: 19985

The fornices of the vagina (sing.: fornix of the vagina or fornix vaginae) are the superior portions of the vagina, extending into the recesses created by the vaginal portion of cervix. There is an anterior fornix, a posterior fornix, and two lateral fornices. The fornices vary in shape and size, with the posterior fornix being the largest. The word fornix is Latin for 'arch'.

== Sexuality ==
During sexual intercourse in the missionary position, the tip of the penis may reach the anterior fornix, while in the rear-entry position it may reach the posterior fornix.

The anterior fornix is also called the a-spot, an analogue to the g-spot (Gräfenberg spot), which is closer to the vaginal opening, and also on the anterior side of the vagina.
