= Sexual penetration =

Sexual activity that involves inserting a person's body part into another person

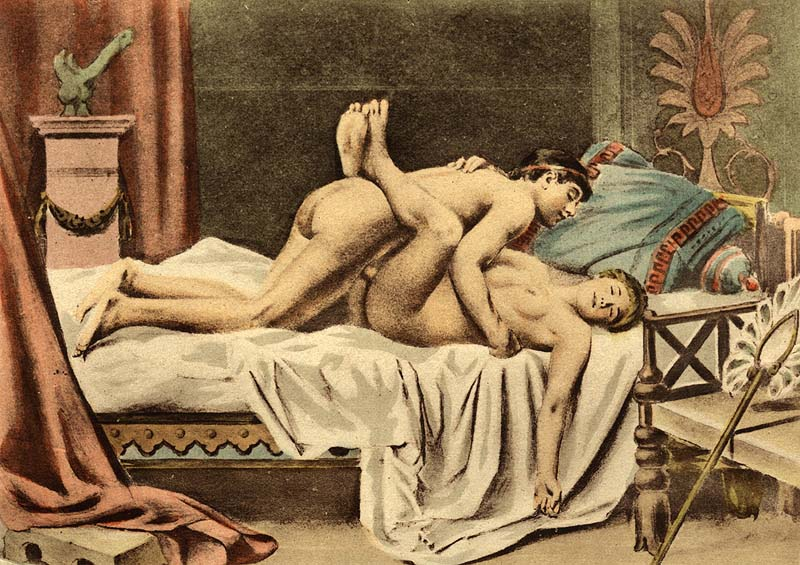
Penile-vaginal penetration occurring in the missionary position, depicted by Édouard-Henri Avril

Sexual penetration is the insertion of a body part or other object into a body orifice, such as the vagina, mouth, or anus, as part of human sexual activity or sexual behavior in non-human animals.

The term is most commonly used in statute law in the context of proscribing certain sexual activities. Terms such as "sexual intercourse" or "carnal knowledge" are more commonly found in older statutes, while many modern criminal statutes use the term "sexual penetration" because it is a broad term encompassing (unless otherwise qualified) any form of penetrative sexual activity, including digital (i.e., the fingers) or with an object, and may involve only the most minimal penetration. Some jurisdictions refer to some forms of penetration as "acts of indecency", or other terminology.

== Definitions ==
When a penis is inserted into a vagina, it is generally called vaginal sex, vaginal intercourse, or penis-in-vagina (PIV) sex. When a penis penetrates another person's anus, it is called anal sex or anal intercourse. Penetrative oral sex may involve penetration of the mouth by a penis (fellatio) .The tongue may also penetrate the anus during anilingus. If one or more fingers are used to penetrate an orifice, it is called fingering or digital penetration. The insertion of an object, such as a dildo, vibrator or other sex toy, into a person's genital area or anus may also be considered sexual penetration. Penetrative sex is referred to as coitus or connotative sex.

== Unlawful ==
Penetrative sex crimes are generally considered more serious than non-penetrative sex crimes, and sexual penetration of a child even more so. A child below the statutory age of consent cannot consent to acts involving sexual penetration. In laws, the term sexual penetration is commonly used in relation to sex with children. Unlawful sexual penetration is generally an offense irrespective of how deep the penetration was and irrespective of whether ejaculation of semen took place.

Laws may distinguish particular forms of sexual penetration as part of the offense. For example, the law in the U.S. state of Oregon provides:

"Unlawful sexual penetration in the first degree" is a felony that occurs where the offender "penetrates the vagina, anus or penis of another with any object other than the penis or mouth of the actor", if the victim is "subjected to forcible compulsion", or is "under 12 years of age", or "is incapable of consent by reason of mental defect, mental incapacitation or physical helplessness"

— Unlawful sexual penetration in the first degree, Oregon Statutes § 163.411

In the United Kingdom, sexually penetrating a relative is an offense.

Various forms of penetration have at times been considered obscene and been prohibited. Works containing such penetrations may be considered pornography.

== See also ==
- Penile-vaginal intercourse
- Sex and the law
