= Lateral coital position =

Sex position

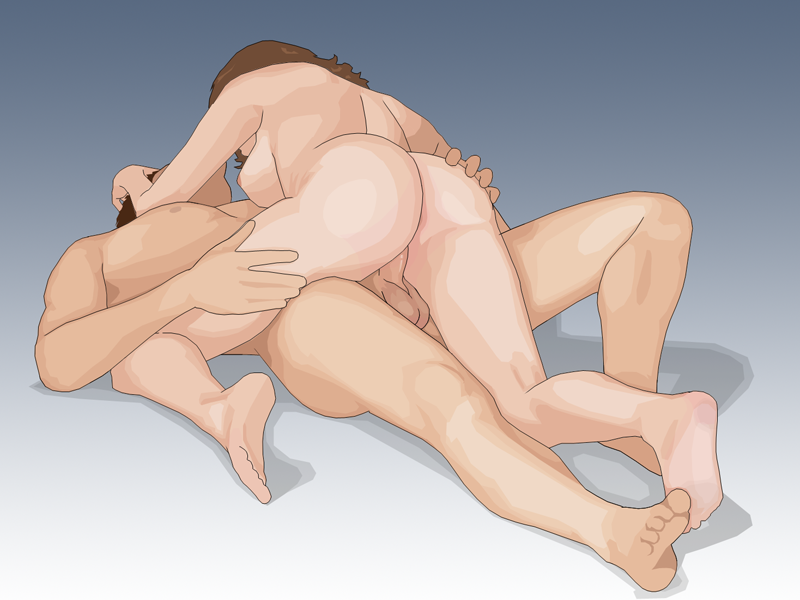
An illustration of a couple demonstrating the lateral coital position

The lateral coital position is a sex position described by Masters and Johnson in their book, Human Sexual Inadequacy. The position was preferred by 75% of their heterosexual respondents once they had tried it.

== Technique ==
Moving into this position requires that the partners begin with woman on top sexual position with penis penetrating the woman and then:

1. The man lifts the woman's right leg up slightly with his left hand.
2. The man begins to bend his left knee without lifting his knee from the bed. Instead, he slides his left knee outwards as it bends, opening his left inner thigh towards the ceiling. He slides his left leg upward and outward until it has passed underneath her lifted right knee.
3. Meanwhile, the woman leans to her left, and places her weight on her left knee. This allows her to straighten out her lifted right leg behind her, placing it inside her partner's bent left leg. Care must be taken at this point that the penis does not slip out.
4. Once the legs are switched, the woman leans forward to the man's chest. He holds her body firmly against his body with both arms.
5. Together, they roll to her right (his left), where her upper body remains. She may prop herself up on her right elbow or lie flat against a pillow. The man rolls back flat upon his back, while they keep their pelvises pressed together. At this point the man is lying flat on his back on the bed and the plane of the woman's torso is almost perpendicular to that of the man's. Her shoulders are almost vertical, with her left shoulder above her right shoulder. Her torso is twisted so that her pelvis is horizontal, resting on his pelvis. The woman's weight is entirely on the right side of her body and her right elbow.
6. They resume intercourse.

== Advantages ==
This position leaves the partners both fully supported by the bed (the man on his back, the woman on her right shoulder and torso) except for the woman's left leg which is resting on the man's right hip. The man is flat on his back, while the woman is rolled slightly to her right. Their bodies form an angle of roughly 30°, leaving the partners face to face with the woman's weight on her right shoulder. Pillows are used under both partners' heads. Should her size require it, more pillows may be needed to support the woman's upper body.

According to Masters and Johnson, "when facility in lateral coital positioning has been obtained, there is no pinning of either the male or female partner. There is mutual freedom of pelvic movement in any direction, and there will be no cramping of muscles or necessity for tiring support of body weight. The lateral coital position provides both sexes flexibility for free sexual expression. This position particularly is effective for the woman, as she can move with full freedom to enjoy either slow or rapid pelvic thrusting, depending upon current levels of sexual tensions."

The position was recommended by them for all couples, and also particularly in cases of premature ejaculation due to reduced pressure on the man.
