= Woman on top =

Sex position in which a woman is on top of another person

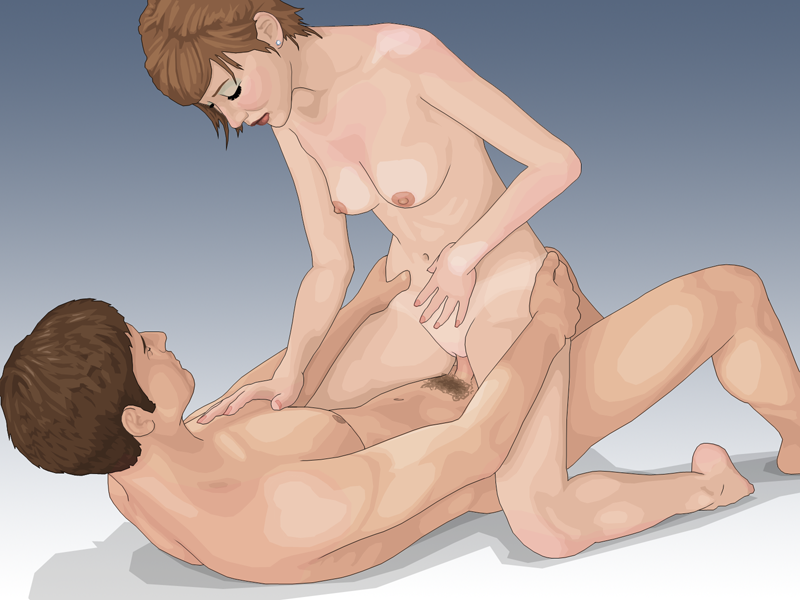
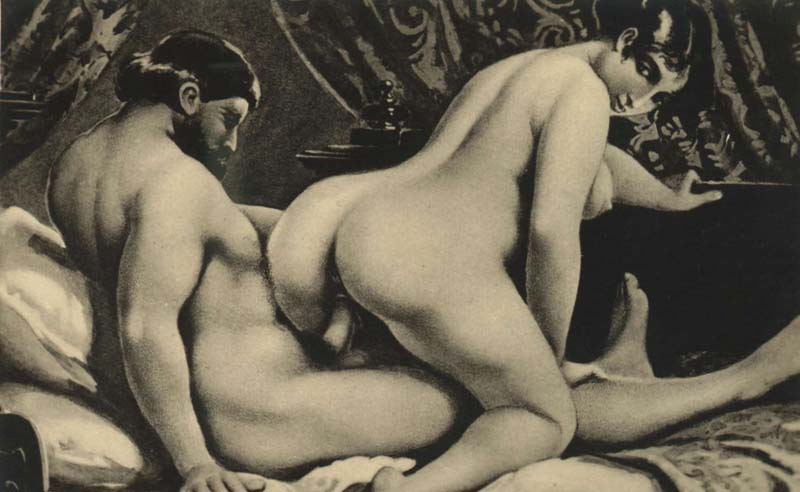
Top: An illustration of a typical forward facing position (colloquially called the "cowgirl position").
Bottom: An illustration by Édouard-Henri Avril of the reverse facing position (colloquially called the "reverse cowgirl position").

Woman on top is any sex position in which the woman is on top of her sexual partner during sexual activity. The position most commonly associated with the woman on top is often called the cowgirl position, which derives its name from the image of the woman "riding" the man as a cowgirl rides a bucking horse. In that position, a man typically lies on his back with his legs closed, while the female partner straddles him, usually in a kneeling position facing either towards or away from him (the latter called reverse cowgirl), and either the man or woman inserts the man's erect penis into the woman's vagina or anus.

The cowgirl position is cited as one of the most popular sex positions, especially by women, because it gives them control over the rhythm and pace of vaginal stimulation and the extent and duration of penetration, and because of its ability to adequately stimulate the clitoris. There are other positions in which the woman may be on top, including the 69 position and the pompoir sex position.

In any of these positions, the woman is usually the active partner during sexual activity, and in addition to satisfying herself can stimulate or massage the man's scrotum, especially if his legs are spread. The woman may take the position in the course of sexual activity, especially if the man has attained orgasm while she has not; and in this position, she or her partner may perform fingering for her to achieve orgasm.

== Variations ==
Initially, the man typically lies on his back with his legs together, while the female partner straddles him in a kneeling position. With the woman's legs open, either the man or woman would insert the man's erect penis into the woman's vagina. Once the woman has attained sufficient vaginal lubrication, she feels comfortable in thrusting up and down the penis and is in a position to vary her position for variety and enhanced pleasure. She can, for example, tilt her body forward toward a full lying position or backwards, or rock sideways. The woman has control over the rhythm and speed of her thrusting. She can also spread the man's legs and position herself between them. In this position, she can tighten her legs at will, to increase the pressure on the man's penis and on her crotch, and the man can also tighten his legs to increase the pressure. In this position, the man's legs are free to raise, as high as the Amazon position, with his legs rolled up towards her chest, but this also should be done with care. These changes can alter the depth and angle of penetration.

The woman can also sit backwards on the man and alter her position similarly.

The woman may also be on top in a precursor to the lateral coital position. In this position, the woman will usually prefer to kneel, as a squat will usually place a significantly greater stress on her legs.

=== Cowgirl position ===
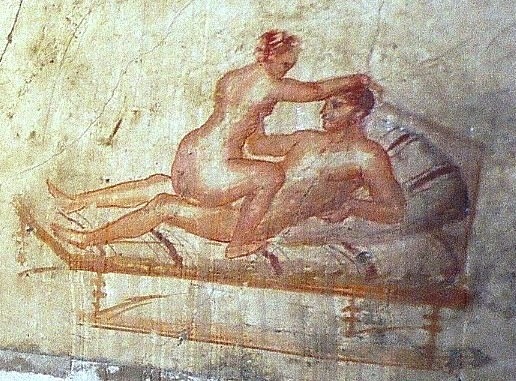
Depiction of the cowgirl position (also known as the "riding" position) from Pompeii during the era of ancient Rome, 62–79 BC)

In the cowgirl position, the man lies on his back or sits, with the woman straddling him across his pelvis facing forward, either in a kneeling or squatting position. The woman will align her vagina with the man's erect penis, and lower herself onto the penis with either the man or the woman guiding the penis into the woman's vagina for penetration. With the erect penis inside the woman, the woman can glide up and down the man's penis, controlling the rhythm and pace of vaginal stimulation and the extent and duration of penetration. The woman is free to change her position; possibilities range from leaning back to stretching out on her partner's chest to rocking from side to side or in a circular motion. Each of those changes would alter the angle and depth of penetration and which part of the vaginal area and sex organs are stimulated. The man's hands are free to reach and touch the woman's breasts, clitoris, buttocks, face etc., and the partners can maintain eye contact. With the woman in the sitting or leaning back positions, the man may also stimulate her nipples and clitoris with his fingers, or suck on her nipples if she inclines towards him or he raises his torso towards her.

In this position, a woman can continue with the up and down motion after the man has achieved orgasm until she reaches orgasm. Afterwards, she may collapse onto the man's chest, with her vagina being very sensitive to further stimulation. On the other hand, if the woman reaches orgasm before the man, the woman may raise her pelvis to enable the man to actively thrust upwards or the couple may change to a position which enables the man to continue thrusting, such as the missionary position.

=== Reverse cowgirl position ===
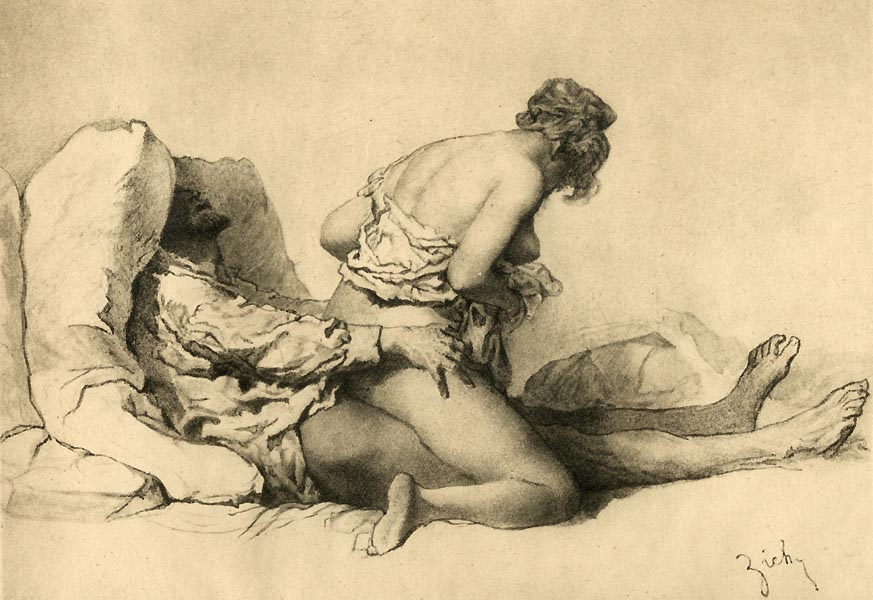
Depiction of the reverse cowgirl position by Mihály Zichy (c. 1911)

In the reverse cowgirl position, the woman straddles the man, facing his feet while either kneeling or squatting. Once either she or the man has guided the penis into the woman's vagina, she can keep her torso upright, lean forward or back to rest on the man's chest, or shift sideways as desired. The man's legs can either lie flat on the bed or be arched. The woman also has control over the pace, rhythm, depth, and duration of penetration. By varying her position and thrusts, she can adjust the level of stimulation for the man while simultaneously stimulating her clitoris or an area known as the "G-spot."

=== Reverse missionary position ===
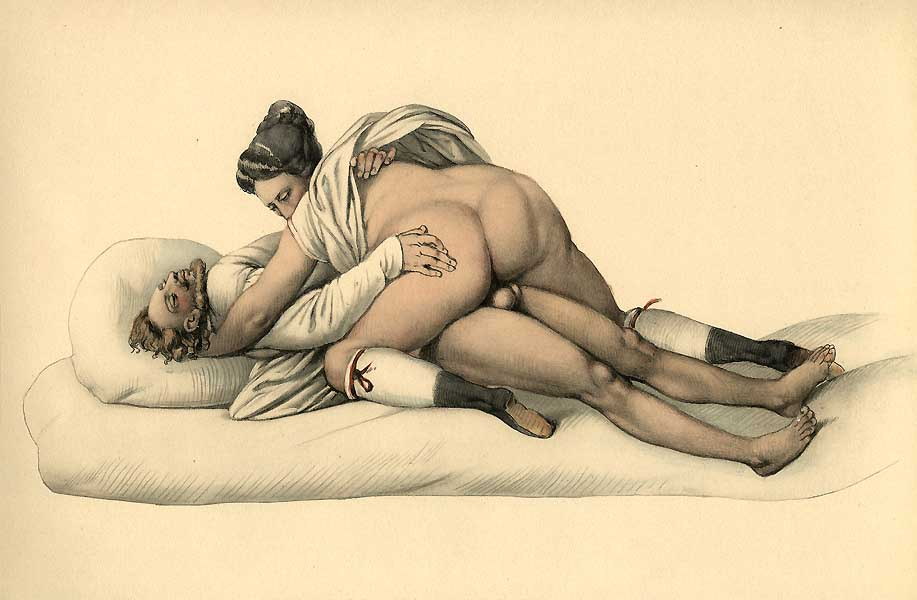
Depiction of reverse missionary position by Johann Nepomuk Geiger (1840)

When the woman lies on her partner's chest, this is also called the reverse missionary position. Stretching out with her legs on the man puts more pressure on the woman's mons pubis and clitoris. If the man separates his legs, the woman can put her legs between his. In this position, she can increase the tightness on the man's penis by pressing her thighs together, or the man may press the woman's thighs together. This increases vaginal friction, but she can still control the pace and rhythm of her thrusts. As most women approach orgasm, they experience acute vaginal contractions, which also increases the man's sexual stimulation by increasing tightness on his penis.

=== Sitting ===
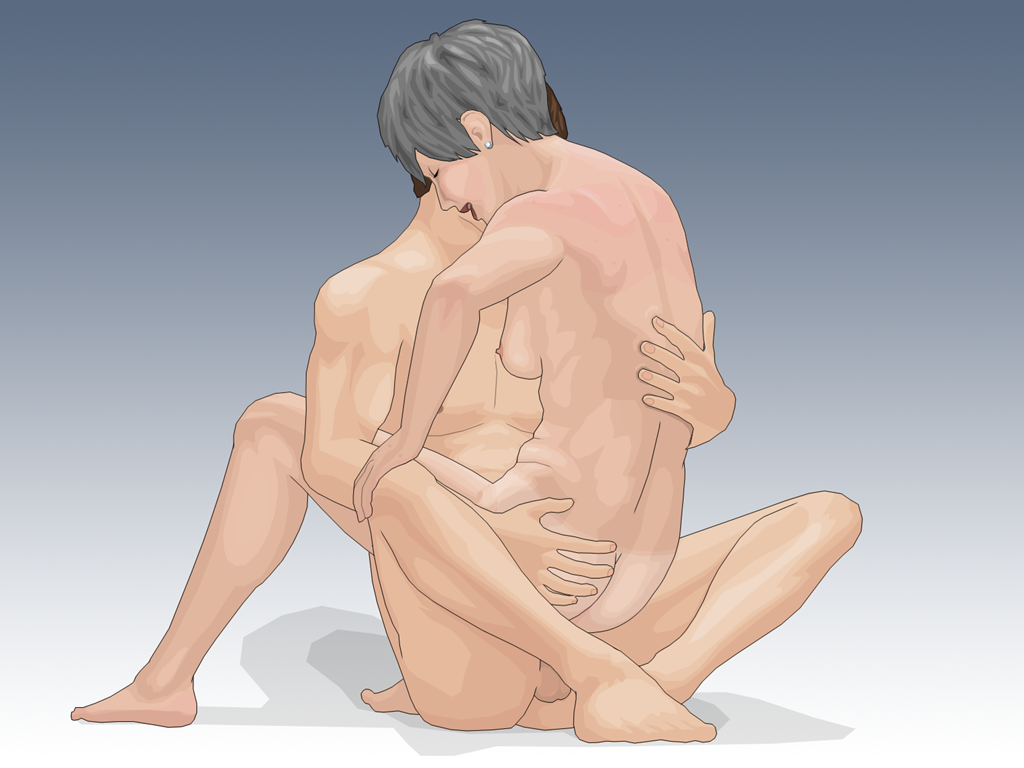
A woman sitting on top of a man who is sitting in a lotus position

In sitting/seated positions, the man sits on an area surface, such as a floor or bed, with his legs outstretched or crossed, with the cross-legged position called the lotus position/lotus flower, and the woman sits between or straddles the man's legs, either facing towards and wrapping her legs around the man, or facing away from the man. This position is also known as pounding on the spot in the Burton translation of The Perfumed Garden. Alternatively, the man sits in a chair and the woman straddles and faces towards or away from the man, with both of their feet on the floor.

=== Sitting on lap ===
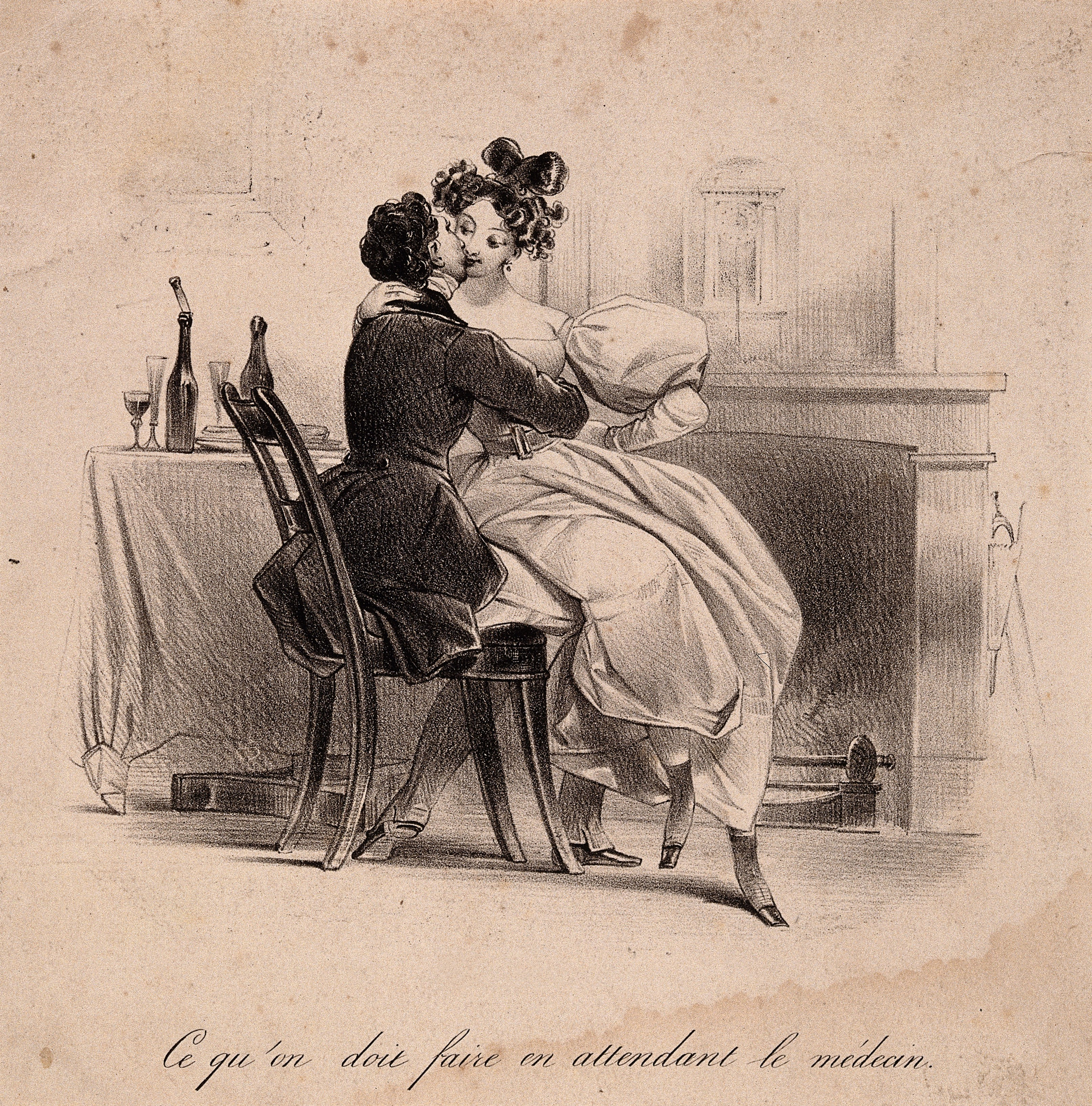
A lithograph by Charles Philipon of a female patient sitting on a doctor's lap

Among adults, a female sitting on the lap of another person usually indicates an intimate or romantic relationship between the two, or may be regarded as flirtatious. In public, such behaviour may be regarded as a public display of affection. In private, sitting on a man's lap or being pulled by the man onto his lap, especially if she straddles his legs or waist, when accompanied with a smile, kiss or other flirtatious gesture, may be regarded as showing either's interest in sexual activity or as foreplay. It is rare for a man to sit on a woman's lap, though not for him to lay his head there.

The erotic significance in sitting on a lap is a factor in the erotic activity in strip clubs such as a lap dance, where one person (usually a woman) straddles the lap of the other and gyrates their lower extremities in a provocative manner.

=== Amazon position ===
In Amazon position, the male partner lies on his back with his legs raised and his knees drawn toward his torso, creating space for the female partner to position herself between them. She then straddles his pelvis and lowers herself into a squatting or kneeling stance, guiding penetration as she descends. The thrusting motion is generated through her vertical movement. Although most commonly used for vaginal intercourse, the position can be adapted for anal penetration as well.

The Amazon position carries certain risks, such as penile fracture. The posture can also place considerable stress on the female partner's knees. A variation of this position, sometimes referred to as the "reverse Amazon", involves the female partner facing away from the male partner.

== Advantage ==
An advantage of the woman-on-top positions is that the man's weight is not on the woman, making it easier for her to control the depth and speed of penetration. These positions are also beneficial if the man is recovering from a serious illness or surgery.

== Gallery ==
Sex with the woman on top has been depicted in art as far back as the 1st Century CE:

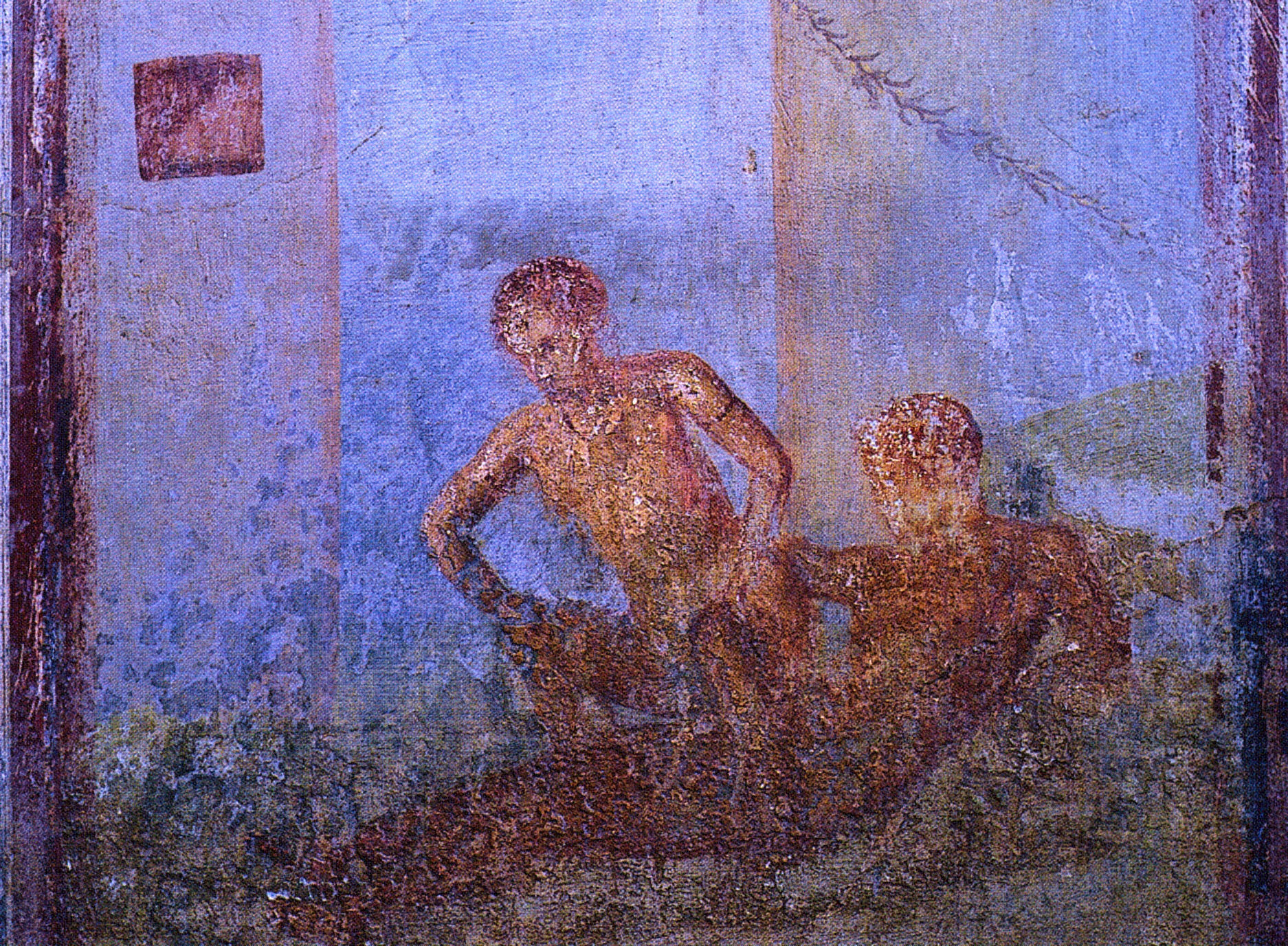
A female is sitting on a male's lap, lowering herself on his penis. Wall painting from Pompeii, 1st Century CE

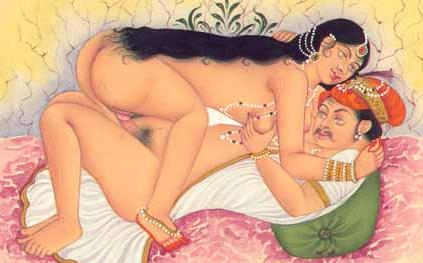
Woman-on-top position in the Kama Sutra (2nd – 3rd century CE)

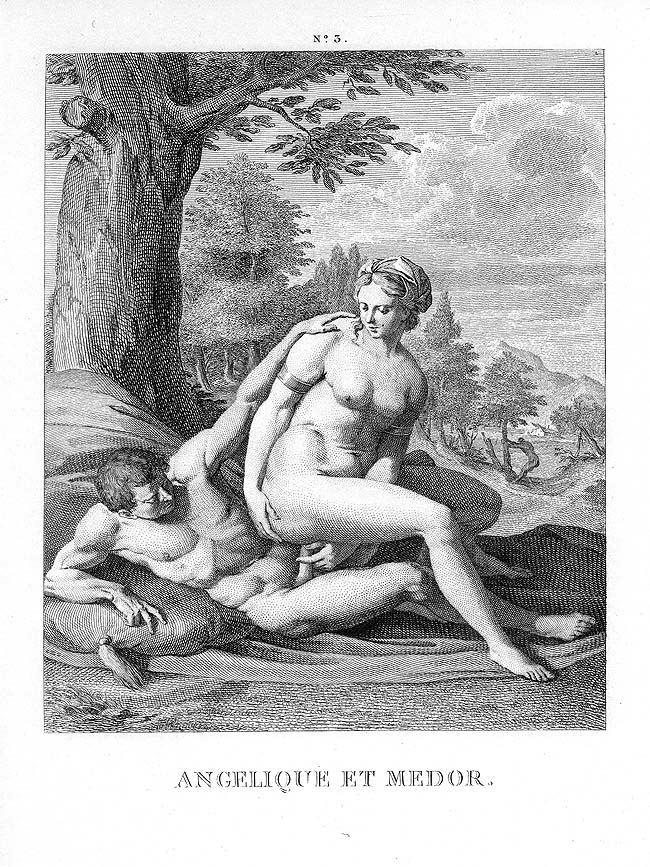
Agostino Carracci (1557–1602), Angélique et Médor, two characters from the opera Roland

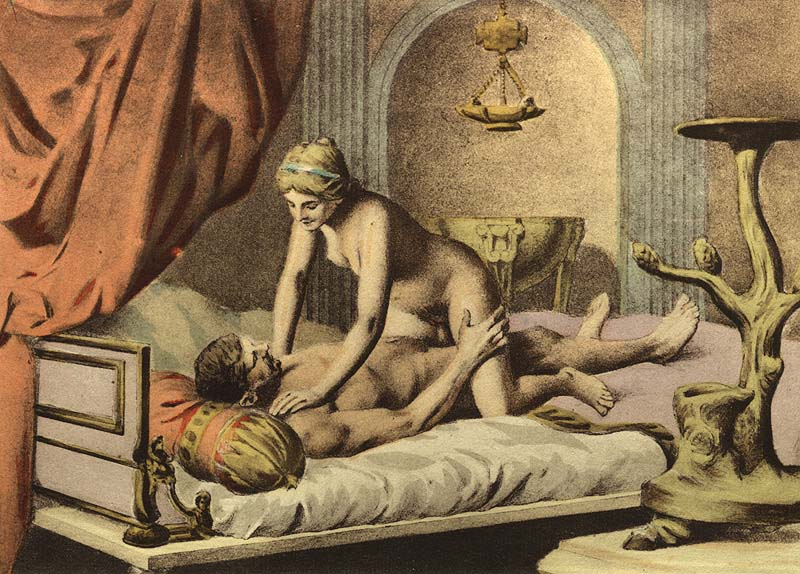
Édouard-Henri Avril's (1849–1928) image of a woman-on-top position

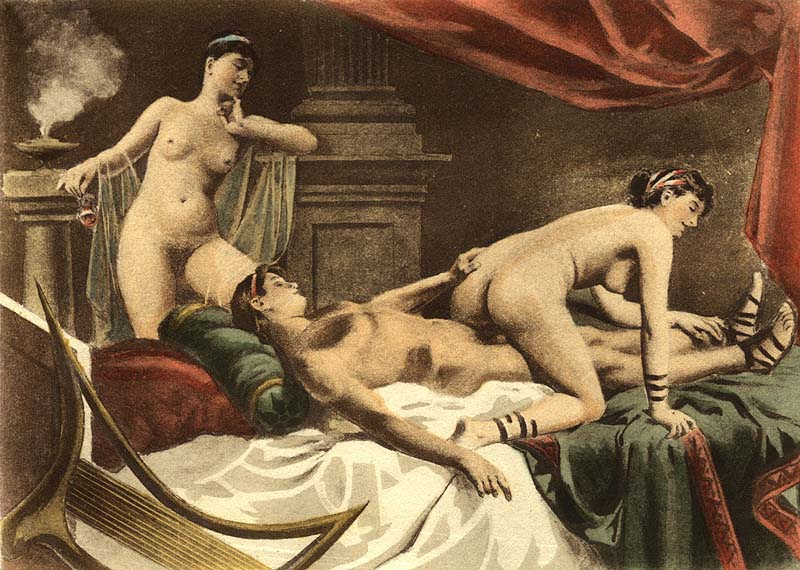
Édouard-Henri Avril's image of reverse cowgirl position

== See also ==
- Doggy style
- Pompoir
