= Missionary position =

Sex position

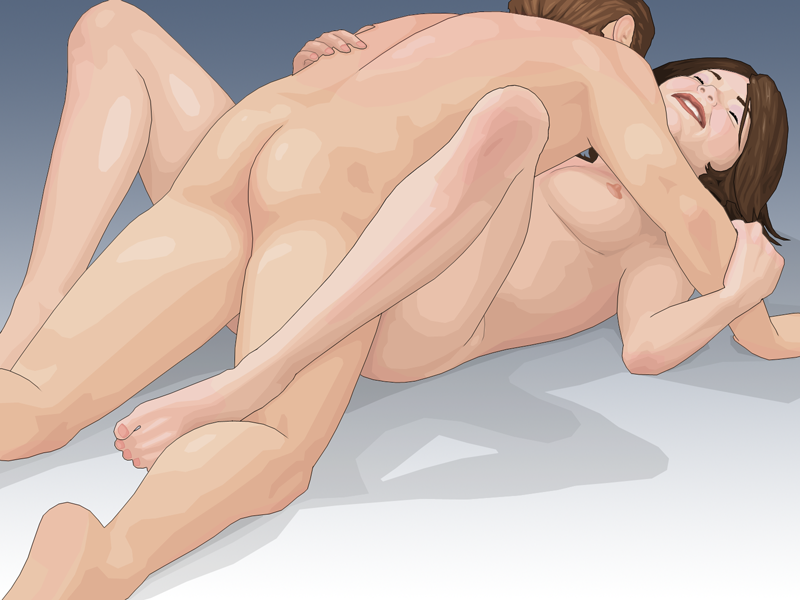
A heterosexual couple with the man on top, the most commonly practiced sex position, with penetration involving ventro-ventral body contact.

The missionary position (or man-on-top position) is a sex position in which, generally, a woman lies on her back and spreads her legs and a man lies on top of her while they face each other and engage in vaginal intercourse. The position may also be used for other sexual activity, such as anal sex. It is commonly associated with heterosexual sexual activity, but is also used by same-sex couples. It may involve sexual penetration or non-penetrative sex (for example, intercrural sex), and its penile-vaginal aspect is an example of ventro-ventral (front-to-front) reproductive activity. Variations of the position allow varying degrees of clitoral stimulation, depth of penetration, participation on the part of the woman, and the likelihood and speed of orgasm.

The missionary position is the most common sex position, but it is not universally regarded as the most favoured one. The missionary position is often preferred by couples who enjoy the romantic aspects of ample skin-to-skin contact and opportunities to look into each other's eyes and kiss and caress each other. The position is also believed to be a good position for reproduction. During sexual activity, the missionary position allows the man to control the rhythm and depth of pelvic thrusting; it is also possible for the woman to thrust against him by moving her hips or pushing her feet against the bed, or squeeze him closer with her arms or legs. The position is not suitable for late stages of pregnancy, and is less desired when the woman wants to have greater control over the rhythm and depth of penetration during intercourse.

== Etymology and other usage ==
A common story and belief is that the term 'missionary position' arose in connection with English-speaking Christian missionaries, who supposedly encouraged the sexual position in new converts in the colonial era, but a contradictory fact says that the term likely had originated from Alfred Kinsey's Sexual Behavior in the Human Male (1948) through a confluence of misunderstandings and misinterpretations of historical documents.

The French refer to it as the 'classical' position. Tuscans refer to the position as 'the Angelic position', while some Arabic-speaking groups call it 'the manner of serpents.' Before the release of Kinsey's work, the missionary position was known by several names, including 'the matrimonial', 'the Mama-Papa position', 'the English-American position', and 'the male superior position'. In 1948, Kinsey published the male volume of the Kinsey Reports, Sexual Behavior in the Human Male. He described the American preference for the position and called it "the English-American position". Discussing Malinowski's The Sexual Life of Savages in North-Western Melanesia, Kinsey wrote, "It will be recalled that Malinowski (1929) records the nearly universal use of a totally different position among the Trobrianders ... [and] ... that caricatures of the English-American position are performed around ... campfires, to the great amusement of the natives who refer to the position as the 'missionary position.'" As of 2001, lexicographers and sexologists have not found use of the term 'missionary position' before Kinsey.

In 2001, Robert Priest examined the origins of the term and concluded that Kinsey had confused several factors in accidentally coining the term. First, according to Malinowski, Trobrianders played and sang mocking songs under the full moon, and not around a campfire. In Sexual Behaviors, Kinsey wrote that the Trobrianders mocked face-to-face man-on-top woman-below intercourse, but does not give context. He mentioned that the position was learned from "white traders, planters, or officials", but does not discuss missionaries. Kinsey also recalled that the medieval Catholic Church taught the position, and upon seeing the natives mocking it, assumed that missionaries had taught it to them. Finally, Malinowski wrote that he saw an engaged Trobriand couple holding hands and leaning against each other, which the natives described as misinari si bubunela — the 'missionary fashion'. Upon accidentally combining these similar facts, Kinsey invented a new phrase despite believing that he was reporting an old one.

From then on, the story of the name's origin may have been retold until it became largely accepted, with its connection to Kinsey and Malinowski having faded. Writers began using the expression for sexual intercourse in the late 1960s, and as Alex Comfort's bestseller The Joy of Sex (1972) and the Oxford English Dictionary (1976) spread the term 'missionary position', it gradually replaced older names. By the 1990s, it had spread to other languages: 'Missionarsstellung' (German), 'postura del misionero' (Spanish), 'missionarishouding' (Dutch) and 'position du missionaire' (French).

== Variations ==
Though there are a number of variations and adoptions of the missionary position, the classic missionary position involves a man and a woman, with the woman lying on her back and the man on top. Variations in the positions may vary the angle and depth of penile penetration.

=== Basic position ===
In the missionary position, a woman lies on her back on a bed or other surface with her legs comfortably spread with the soles of the feet resting. The penetrating partner positions himself between the woman's spread legs, and either uses his arms to hold himself up, or lets his weight rest on her. When the woman's vagina is sufficiently lubricated, which may involve fingering her vulva or clitoris in particular, the man will introduce his erect penis in her vagina for penetration, and may use fingers to open the woman's labia and guide the penis in.

With the penis inside the woman's vagina, the man can control the force, depth, and rhythm of thrusts, and can also control to some extent the female partner's movements. Subject to the man's weight and position, the woman may have some control by pushing her feet and legs against the mattress and by side movements in her pelvis as well as by clutching onto and moving with her partner. A woman can increase the force of a man's thrust by moving against the man's rhythm.

The man may straddle the woman, taking the woman's legs between his. This restricts and further controls the woman's movements, and the man can increase the tightness on the penis by pressing the woman's thighs together. However, this increases vaginal friction and makes thrusting more difficult.

During sexual intercourse, most women experience involuntary vaginal contractions. The contraction causes the pelvic muscles to tighten around the penis, which increases the level of her partner's arousal and sexual frenzy and results in the man increasing the pace and force of thrusts as he approaches orgasm, which in turn further increases the woman's vaginal contraction. After a man has achieved orgasm, he will normally collapse onto the woman and will normally not be capable of further thrusting. Some men try to control their orgasm until their female partner also orgasms, but this is not always achieved. At times, a woman can achieve orgasm after the man has ceased thrusting by contracting her vaginal muscles and with pelvic movements, or the couple may change to another position that enables the woman to continue thrusting until she has reached orgasm, such as a woman on top position.

During sexual intercourse in the missionary position, the penis is in preferential contact with the anterior wall of the vagina and the tip of the penis reaches the anterior fornix, while in the rear-entry position it is in preferential contact with the posterior wall of the vagina and probably reaches the posterior fornix.

=== Position of legs ===
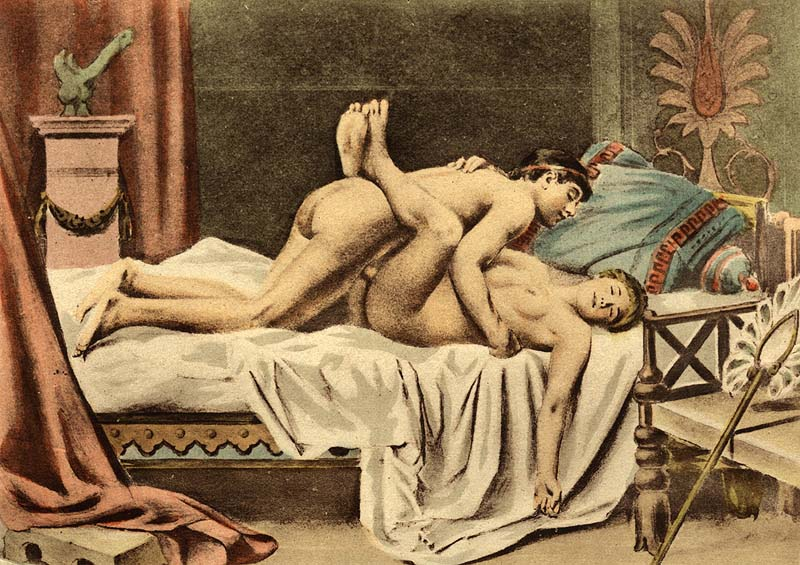
Édouard-Henri Avril, wrapped missionary position. Raising legs allows for deeper penetration.

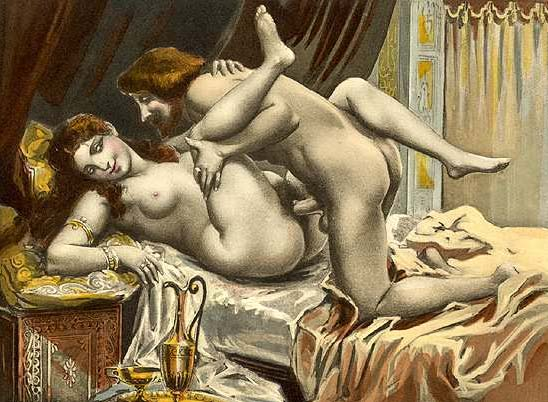
Édouard-Henri Avril, open missionary position.

A receiving woman's arms and legs are generally free to move, although her position and movement may be constrained by the weight of the penetrating partner and other factors. She can adjust the position of her legs for comfort, variety, and to control the angle and depth of penetration. Typically, the higher a woman's legs are positioned, the deeper the penetration will be. When her legs are raised in any manner, she has less control over the rhythm of thrusts. Additionally, raising the legs elevates the woman's pelvis, reduces the angle of penetration, and diminishes the level of clitoral stimulation.

A woman's legs can remain flat or be raised toward her chest, or they can wrap around the penetrating partner at various heights: behind the legs, at the buttocks or back, or over the shoulders. This latter position is known as the Wiener Auster or Viennese oyster. In the higher leg positions the woman's legs may need some support, which may be achieved by crossing the ankles behind the partner or resting on his shoulders. She may also hold them with her hands or cross her arms around them at the knees. Some are flexible enough to cross the legs behind their heads. Alternatively, her partner may hold her legs up.

A pillow or sex pillow can be used, to alter the depth and angle of penetration. A wedge- or ramp-shaped pillow can relieve pressure on the top person's hands and arms. Placing a pillow under the woman's buttocks can lift her pelvis—a Playboy article suggested placing it under her hips to increase pressure on the clitoris. Each of these methods can increase the depth of penetration. Using a pillow can also help the woman arch her back.

In one variant, the woman may lift and slightly bend her legs, resting her feet flat on the bed. This shortens the distance between the vagina and cervix, and may apply more friction to the area termed the G-Spot. The woman may find this variant more comfortable, and it can allow her to push against the man's thrust, giving her some control over the rhythm.

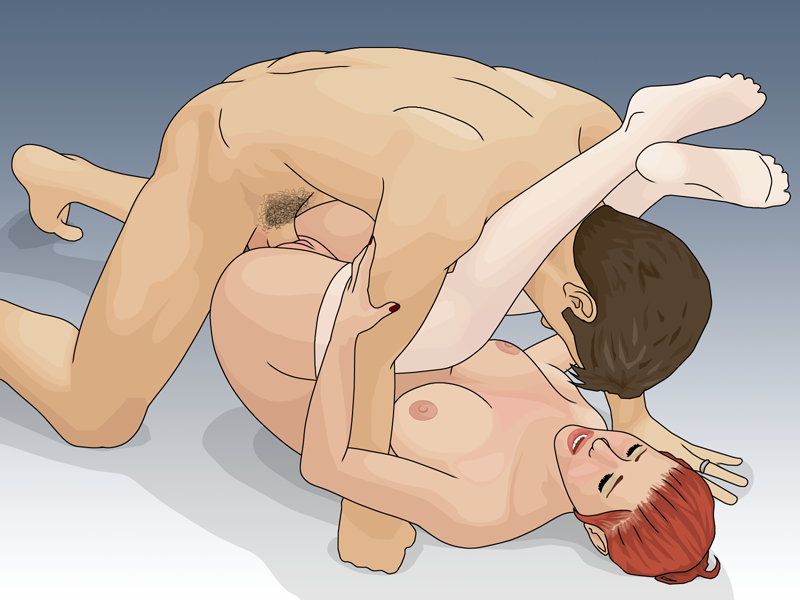
The anvil position

Placing the woman's legs on or over the man's shoulders provides the deepest possible penetration. This variant is sometimes called the anvil. This position aims the head of the penis at the vaginal fornix (posterior fornix). When the legs are held mid-level in this way, the penis can achieve significant depth while attempting to stimulate the G-Spot and achieving more friction on the top of its shaft.

=== Viennese oyster position ===
The Viennese oyster position requires the female to lie on her back and position her legs behind her head, with the groin area being completely exposed. The male partner penetrates the vagina from the top. In some cases, the male partner can help hold the female's legs in position and continue on with intercourse.

=== Butterfly position ===
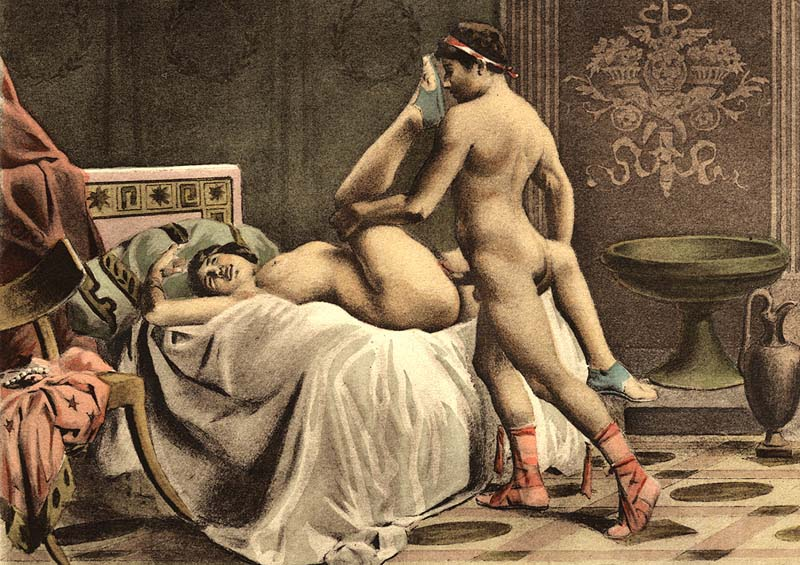
Édouard-Henri Avril, woman in the butterfly position.

In the butterfly position, the woman can lie on her back with her hips on the edge of a platform such as a bed, table, kitchen bench, desk, etc. while the man penetrates her while standing.

=== Riding high ===
In the riding high missionary variant, the man enters the woman and then shifts his body up and forward toward her head. He then rocks back and forth, stimulating her clitoris with his pelvic bone, or base of his penis. This results in more consistent clitoral stimulation at the cost of a man's deep thrusting; accordingly, some men prefer to use it during only part of sex.

=== Anal sex, tribadism and other aspects ===
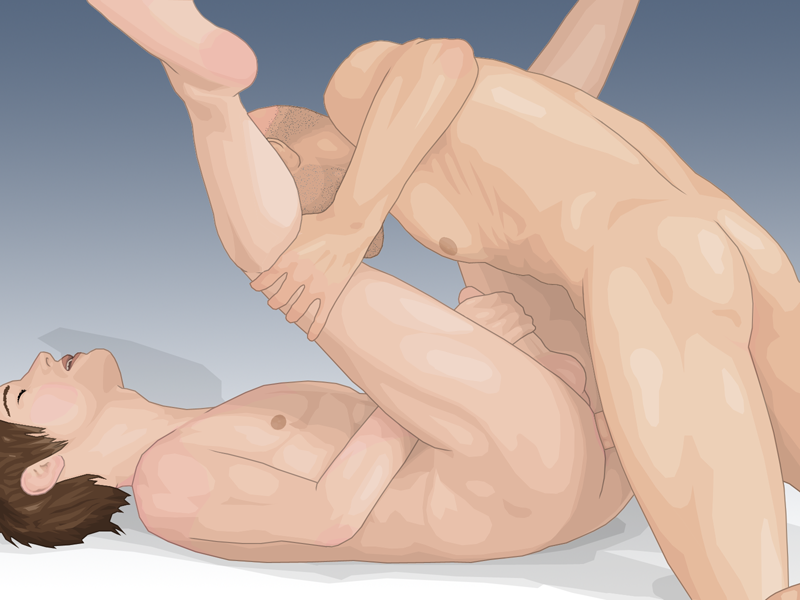
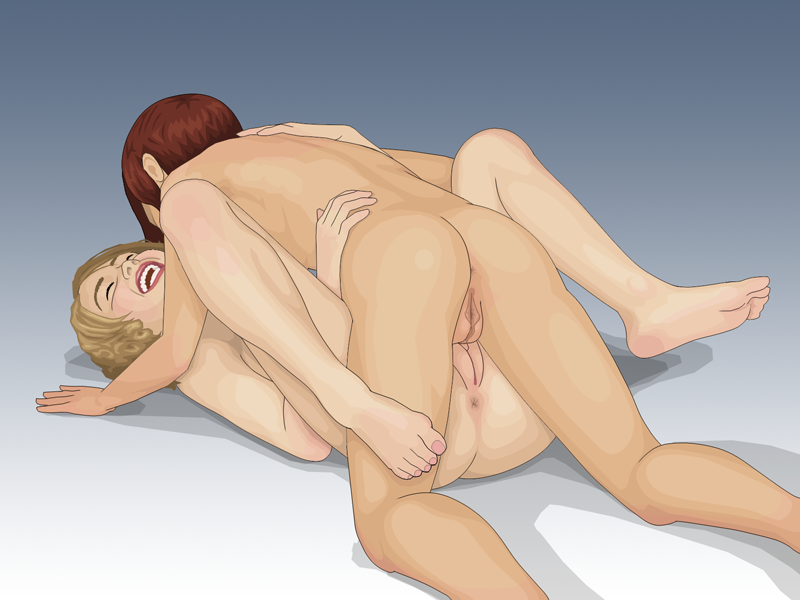
Left: two men engaged in the missionary position during anal sex. Right: two women engaged in the missionary position during tribadism.

Penetrative anal sex may be performed on a partner in the missionary position. The legs may be raised high, with the knees drawn towards their chest, and with some sort of support (such as a pillow) under the receiver's hips for comfort and to raise the receiver's buttocks. The penetrating partner positions himself between the receiver's legs and aligns his penis with the anus for anal penetration. Instead of penetration, an active partner may perform anilingus on the partner with raised legs.

Tribadism between women may be performed in the missionary position. The practice involves women rubbing their vulvas against each other. Female couples may also engage in the missionary position while one or both partners use their fingers or sex toys for stimulation of the clitoris, other parts of the vulva, or vagina.

== Perceived advantages and disadvantages ==
=== Psychological ===
There are many appealing psychological aspects of the missionary position. It is often regarded as a romantic position because the two partners face each other and may maintain eye contact; there is potentially a greater amount of skin-to-skin contact than in any other position; and the couple can hold each other in their arms, which can easily segue into cuddling when sex is over. Partners may engage in other intimate contact, such as kissing, or guiding each other's hips with their hands.

=== Physical ===
The missionary position is commonly used the first time a couple has sex. Thomas Stuttaford notes that it may be more comfortable to do so: "The discomfort of early penetrative sex, if there is any, is usually related to tension in the pelvic or thigh muscles and/or anxiety that has prevented the usual vaginal lubrication. Muscles of the pelvic floor are more relaxed if, initially, the missionary position is chosen and a couple of pillows are arranged under the woman's bottom so her hips are tilted upwards." The Lovers' Guide states that missionary lends itself well to sex with a new partner as it is "a romantic yet fairly unadventurous sex position" that is "non-threatening and loving" and "lays neither partner open to strangeness, anxiety and unfamiliarity."

On the other hand, Sacha Tarkovsky advises women to not use the missionary position when having sex for the first time, stating, "You are not in control, and it will be more painful and you cannot do anything but lay [sic] there and take it." Tarkovsky recommends positions such as woman on top that allow the woman to control the speed and pressure at which she loses her hymen. However, it may not be necessary to completely forgo missionary the first time; Alphonso Sirtle suggests starting with woman on top until the hymen is torn, and then possibly switching to missionary or whatever other position is preferred.

Suzi Godson said, "In an observational study carried out in The Netherlands, magnetic resonance imaging was used to study the male and female genitals during coitus. The images illustrate the very natural fit of the male and female genitals in [the missionary] position. The penis has the shape of a boomerang—one third of its length consists of the root of the penis—and the vaginal walls wrap snugly around it."

According to Sexual Health Resource, "The man-on-top sex positions are very good for couples who are trying to have a baby, because penetration can be very deep. If the woman holds on to her legs behind her knees and draws her thighs right back, sperm can be deposited deep in the vagina—at the neck of the womb. This provided the best chance of conception occurring." Francoeur states that "male-above sex promotes fertility by keeping the opening of the vagina higher than the seminal pool, which, in turn, helps sperm get into the womb and find the egg." However, according to BabyCenter, "There is no evidence that any particular sexual position is more likely to lead to conception." Donnica Moore agrees, stating that while there are no scientific studies regarding the best sexual positions for reproduction, the missionary (man on top) position is typically considered optimal for conception.

Pregnancy Info states that the missionary position may become increasingly awkward for pregnant women as their belly begins to grow. The March of Dimes notes, "Positions that work before pregnancy and early in pregnancy can be uncomfortable or even unsafe at later stages of the baby's development. For example, a woman should avoid lying flat on her back after the fourth month of pregnancy, because the weight of the growing uterus puts pressure on major blood vessels." David Port states, "Beginning early in the second trimester, doctors tend to discourage pregnant women from supine exercise. And the missionary position is exactly that kind of exercise, at least if the activity lasts more than a few fleeting moments."

The male reaching orgasm first can be disruptive to sex, as 50% of penile erection is lost immediately after ejaculation, making him more likely to inadvertently slip out of the vagina, especially during the strong pelvic contractions of female orgasm. In addition to the standard methods for treating premature ejaculation, Zachary Veilleux notes that this problem can be overcome by workarounds such as changing positions frequently (which studies have shown delays male orgasm by a factor of two-three), using lubrication to reduce friction (friction stimulates the male but is not as important in female orgasm), or switching to cunnilingus for a while when close to ejaculation, and then switching back when ejaculation is no longer imminent.

The missionary position is sometimes mocked as a plain vanilla sex position. Archer stated, "To all the sex gymnasts, this kind of banal preference looks lazy, unimaginative and uninformed," but she rebuts this by pointing out the existence of variations: "Missionary is kind of like tofu: You have to add your own flavor." Perhaps due to the ubiquity of this position, its typical role as the first position used by couples, its tendency to put the man in control of speed, tempo and depth, its ability to cause him to quickly reach orgasm, and the fact that it is literally a "male-superior" position with the man on top, missionary is sometimes associated with men who are dominating and uncreative and selfish about sex. According to Gina Ogden, "the cultural missionary position—man on top" is not conducive to romance since "If a relationship is based on authoritarian control, keeping one person on top and the other underneath, it gets old pretty fast—for both partners, really". In Women Who Love Sex, Ogden writes, "Think what will happen to the missionary position when women, en masse, opt for pleasures that stir body and soul instead of continuing to do good-girl intercourse by the book." In Chinua Achebe's Things Fall Apart, the main character ridicules the idea of women making decisions by saying that one might as well say that the woman lies on top of the man when they are making the baby.

The missionary position has potential for clitoral stimulation in several ways. Christakos assures, "This position can give the woman plenty of clitoral stimulation if the man leans forward thus rubbing his pelvic bone against her clitoris." Emily Queenie Chung notes, "Also, this position is the easiest for a woman to stimulate her clitoris manually." Sexual Health Resource notes that also "the man can reach under and stimulate his partner using his fingers on her clitoris" although "the man has limited use of his hands" (presumably this would depend on the variant of the position used and whether the man's hands are occupied holding himself up).

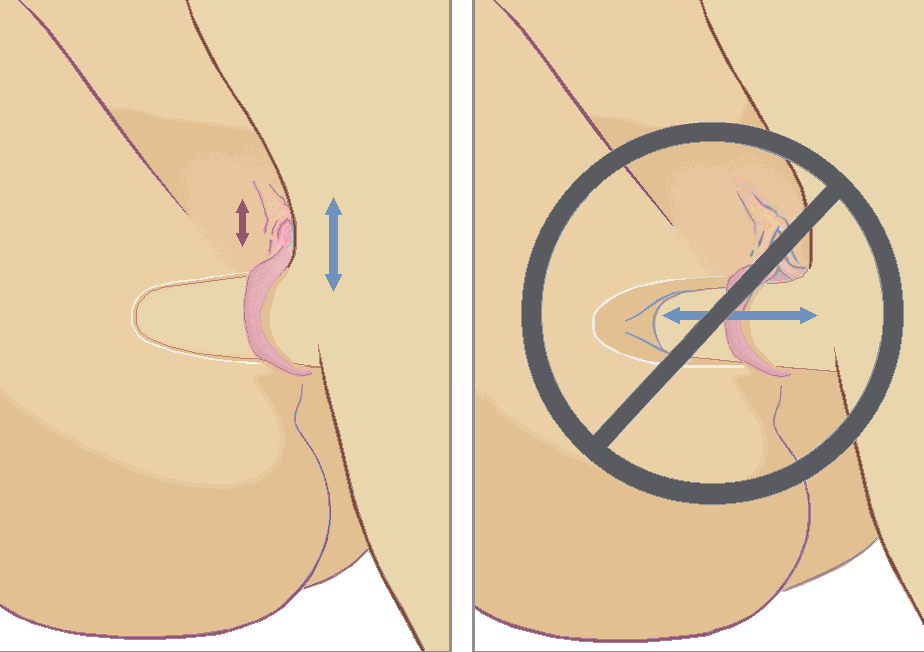
The coital alignment technique.

Since in women the movements of the penis in and out do not stimulate the clitoral glans continuously, women have discovered the "rocking" movement technique. A study of over 3000 American women found that 76% of women use the technique because they find it sexually arousing, while the penis is in their vagina and barely moving, to rub their clitoris against the base of the penis. Rocking is among the techniques that allow a man to mitigate the rise of his arousal, because the penis receives little friction. Unless he suffers from premature ejaculation, he can thus prevent the orgasm in himself while promoting arousal in the woman. This technique is known as the coital alignment technique.

Sexual activity in the missionary position, as a form of physical exercise, may be slightly more vigorous for the man than in other positions. A study conducted by Bohlen et al. found that "man-on-top coitus required more metabolic expenditure than woman-on-top coitus" and that the heart rate during man-on-top sex was higher than in self-stimulation, partner stimulation, or woman-on-top. In contrast, one study showed that there was no difference in heart rate or blood pressure when comparing these two basic positions, while another showed only a minor decrease in oxygen consumption or exertion with a man-on-bottom position during orgasm.

== History ==
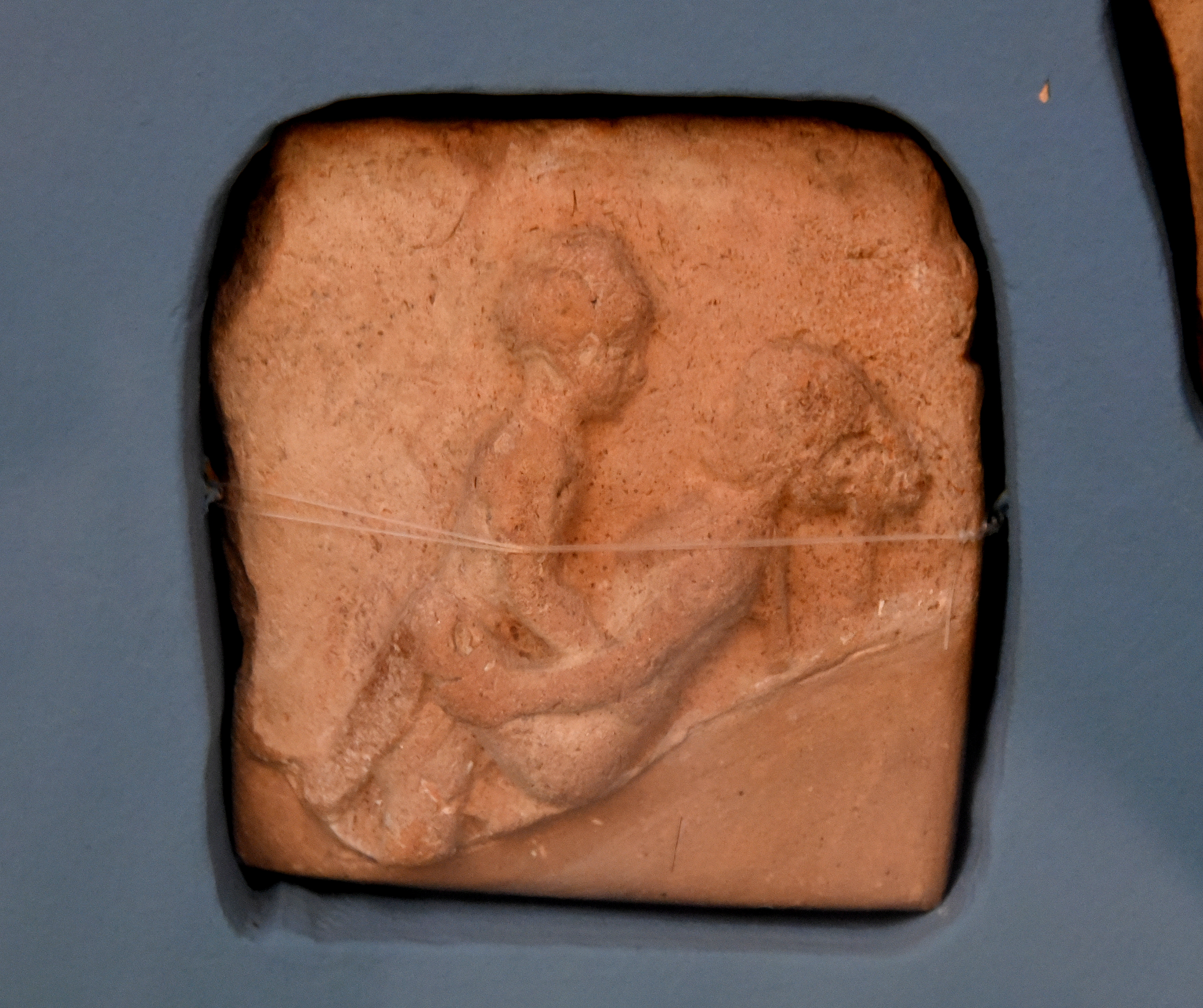
Erotic plaque depicting an intercourse between a male and a female in a missionary position. From Iraq, Old Babylonian Period, 2000-1500 BCE. Ancient Orient Museum, Istanbul.

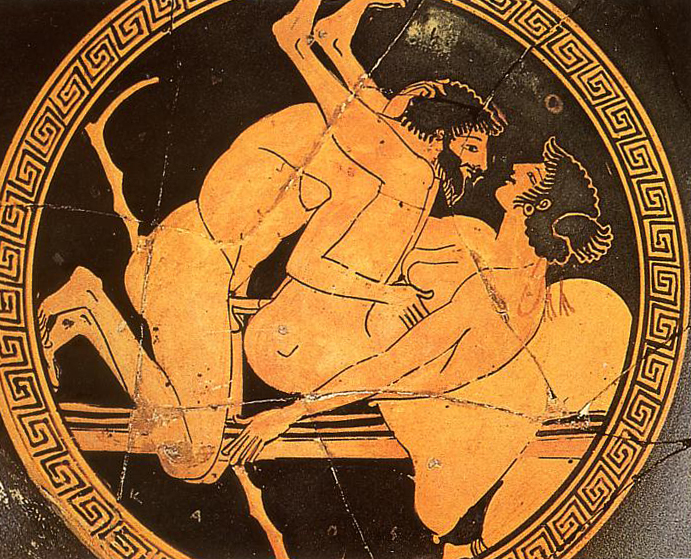
Ancient Greek pottery art, where legs are placed on shoulders

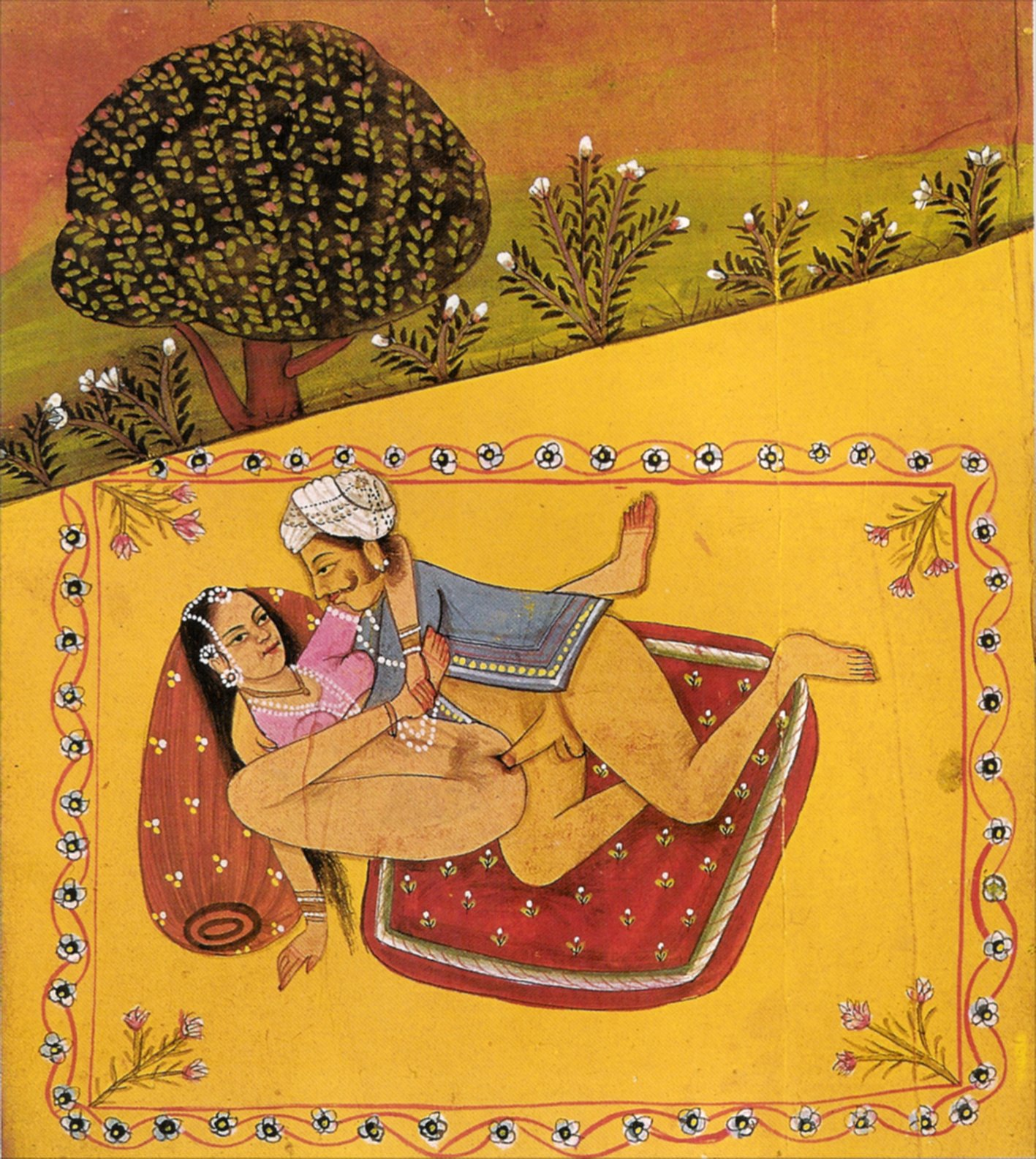
Indian couple in the missionary position, late 19th century

The position has been used at least for millennia if not longer since it is also used by the great apes, as well as other primates. Robert Francoeur notes that evidence of the missionary position's use appears in ancient pottery and art in the Fertile Crescent as well as in the art of Early Greeks, Romans, Peruvians, Indians, Chinese and Japanese. The majority of the positions described in the Kama Sutra involve the woman lying on her back with her legs in a variety of positions. According to Canongate, ancient art shows missionary as being less popular than woman-on-top positions in Ur, Greece, Rome, Peru, India, China and Japan, but Francoeur states that the ancient Chinese preferred male-on-top because of their belief that males are born face down and females face up. Kagaba natives in Colombia preferred missionary because of the stability it offers; they believed that if the woman moved during intercourse, the earth would slip off the shoulders of the four giants who held it up above the waters. Some Kerala tribes believe that the male-on-top position is the only way to conceive warriors.

In ancient Greece, the missionary position was originally an unpopular position. Beds existed, yet not as we know them today, and men married girls 14 or 15 years of age, which created a height differential. These factors made the rear-entry standing position more convenient. However, circa the second century, Artemidorus popularized the missionary position among Greco-Roman Stoics, declaring it "the only proper and natural" position due to the flow of semen.

Although the Bible does not mention sexual positions, from the 6th to 16th centuries, some Church authorities taught that intercourse should be face-to-face, man-on-top, primarily because they believed that semen flows with gravity, leading to conception. Exceptions were made for couples dealing with illness, obesity, or pregnancy. According to John Bancroft's Human Sexuality and Its Problems, Thomas Aquinas believed that crimes against nature included intercourse in "unnatural" ways. Protestants did not communicate proper sex positions, and the Catholic Church eventually abandoned its discourse on the topic. Simon Hardy wrote that the missionary position was used to distinguish "bestial and civilized sex."

Others who held that missionary was the only permitted position included Alexander of Hales and the author of De secretis mulierum, who suggested that nonstandard positions might result in birth defects. Ruth Mazo Karras states that William Peraldus' treatise Summa de virtutibus et vitiis distinguished between sins against nature that were "according to the substance" (intercourse other than vaginal) and "according to the manner, as when a woman mounts." Nicolas Venette's 1680s-era sex manual praised the missionary position as the "common posture...which is most allowable and most voluptuous." Numerous sources have reported that in the United States, some states had outlawed positions other than missionary between husband and wife, or will grant a divorce to a woman whose husband has sex with her in another position. While many states formerly outlawed oral sex, anal sex, buggery, or other "unnatural" acts, no US law has banned dorso-ventral heterosexual sex, or specified which partner needed to be on top.

D'Emilio and Freedman, who are historians of sexuality, note that historical use of the missionary position in the US is marked by social class as well as ethnicity. In the 19th century, white settlers and Protestant missionaries who moved West attempted to assimilate Native American, Mexican, and immigrant peoples into the sexual values held by the middle classes in the American north. These authors also note that the Kinsey studies revealed social class influences, with working class men preferring to use the missionary position over other sexual positions.

== Popularity ==
Among humans, the missionary position is the most commonly used sex position. In his seminal study Sexual Behavior in the Human Female (1953), which focused on American women, researcher Alfred Kinsey stated that 91% of married women surveyed reported using this position most often, whereas 9% reported using it exclusively. A The Journal of Sexual Medicine study entitled What Kind of Erotic Film Clips Should We Use in Female Sex Research? An Exploratory Study selected 18 film clips out of a sample of 90 that were found by the women studied to be particularly mentally appealing and visually arousing. 21% of the original 90 involved the missionary position, but 33% of the final 18 involved missionary. Fewer than 10% of sexually active persons rarely or never use the missionary position. According to Francoeur, the Brazilian Bororo people eschew missionary, finding it insulting for either partner to be above the other during sex. Balinese shun the man-on-top position in favor of what they call "the Oceanic position" due to their perception of the former as being impractical and clumsy. The Cashinahua people use the missionary position to stay stable when they have sex in a forest stream to avoid insect bites. The inhabitants of Inis Beag practice the missionary position exclusively, with very limited foreplay. In addition to humans, the missionary position has also been used by certain other species, including bonobos, gorillas, and armadillos.

== See also ==
- Human sexuality
- Penile-vaginal intercourse
