= Pubovaginal muscle =

Pelvic floor muscle

Details
- Origin: Pubis
- Insertion: Midsection of the lateral vaginal wall
- Actions: Supports the lateral vaginal wall in pelvic cavity

Identifiers
- TA98: A04.5.04.005F
- TA2: 2409

The pubovaginal muscle is a pelvic floor muscle that attaches to the muscles of lateral walls of the midsection of the vagina and the pubis. It is relatively short compared to the other levator ani muscles and extends between the pubic bones and the vagina. Other muscles that are part of the levator ani are: the pubococcygeus muscle which is made up of the puboperineal, pubovaginal, and puboanal muscles; the puborectal muscle; and the iliococcygeal muscle. The pubovaginal muscle was identified by anatomists as early as 1912.
