= Tribadism =

Vulva-vulva or vulva-body rubbing

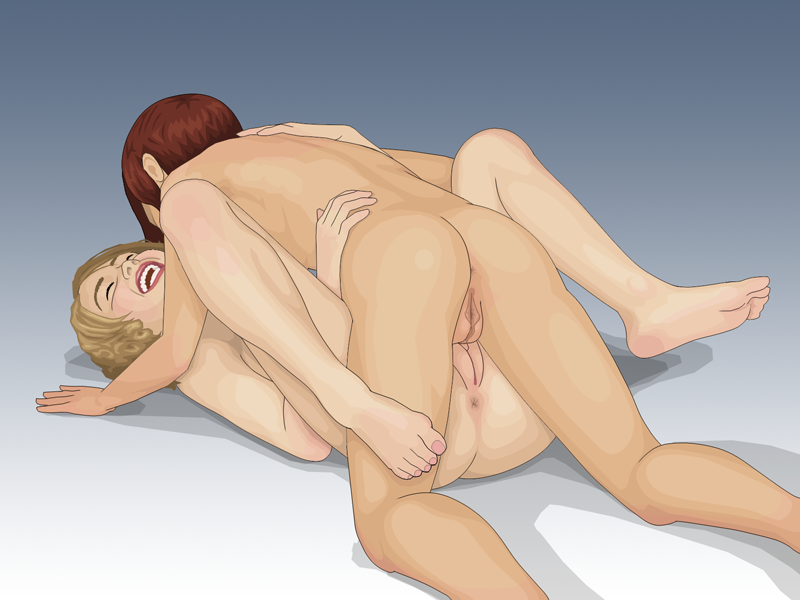
Two women rubbing their vulvae together in the missionary position

Tribadism (/ˈtrɪbədɪzəm/ TRIB-ə-diz-əm) or tribbing, commonly known by its scissoring position, is a lesbian sexual practice involving vulva-to-vulva contact or rubbing the vulva against the partner's thigh, stomach, buttocks, arm, or other body parts (excluding the mouth), especially for stimulation of the clitoris. A variety of sex positions are practiced, including the missionary position.

The term tribadism originally encompassed societal beliefs about women's capability of being penetrative sexual partners. Women accused of having been penetrative during sexual activity were subject to ridicule or punishment. In modern times, the term typically refers to various forms of non-penetrative sex between women.

It is analogous to frot, which is penis-to-penis contact.

== History and culture ==
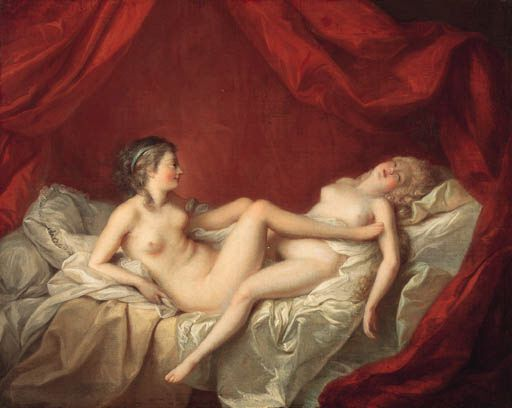
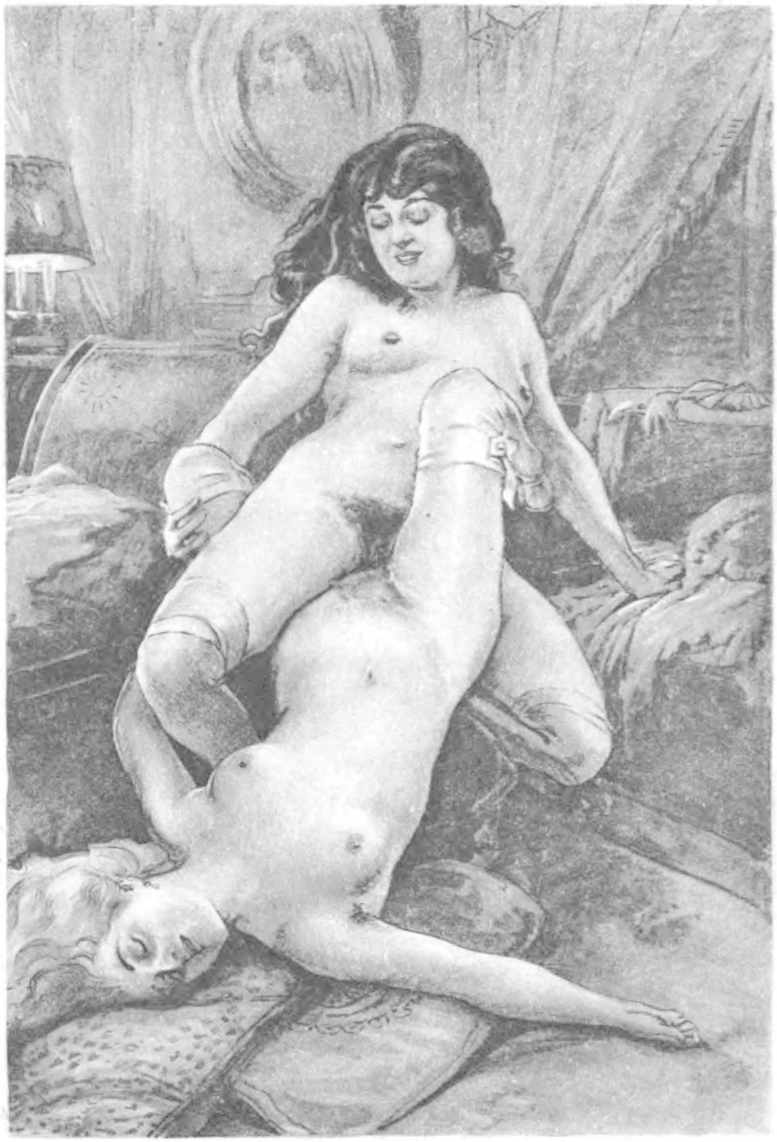
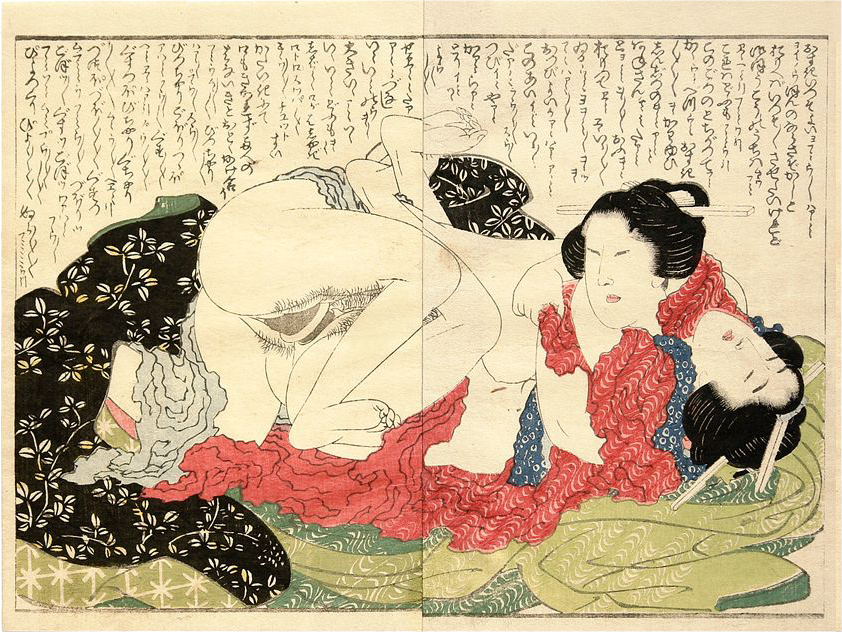
Artworks depicting women engaging in tribadism.

=== Etymology and usage ===
The term tribadism derives from the Greek word τριβάς (tribas), which in turn comes from the verb τρίβω (tribō), "rub". In ancient Greek and Roman sexuality, a tribas, or tribade (English: /ˈtrɪbəd/), was a woman or intersex individual who actively penetrated another person (male or female) through use of the clitoris or a dildo. The term tribade did not begin to refer exclusively to eroticism between women until Late Antiquity. Because penetration was viewed as "male-defined" sexuality, a tribas was considered the most vulgar lesbian. The Greeks and Romans recognized same-sex attraction, but as any sexual act was believed to require that one of the partners be "phallic" and that therefore sexual activity between women was impossible without this feature, mythology popularly associated lesbians with either having enlarged clitorises or as incapable of enjoying sexual activity without the substitution of a phallus. This appears in Greek and Latin satires as early as the late first century.

In English texts, tribade is recorded as early as 1601, in Ben Jonson's Praeludium (Poem X in The Forest), to as late as the mid-nineteenth century; it was the most common lesbian term in European texts, through the proliferation of classical literature, anatomies, midwiferies, sexual advice manuals, and pornography. It also came to refer to lesbian sexual practices in general, though anatomical investigation in the mid-eighteenth century led to skepticism about stories of enlarged clitorises and anatomists and doctors argued for a more precise distinction between clitoral hypertrophy and hermaphroditism.

Author Bonnie Zimmerman stated, "More often, however, [European] writers avoided the term, instead euphemistically invoking 'unnatural vice,' 'lewd behavior,' 'crimes against nature,' 'using an instrument,' and 'taking the part of a man.'" In the eighteenth century, where the term saw one of its most popular uses, it was employed in several pornographic libels against Marie Antoinette, who was "tried and roundly convicted in the press" as being a tribade. "[Her] rumored tribadism had historically specific political implications," stated author Dena Goodman. "Consider her final (fictive) testimony in The Confession of Marie-Antoinette: 'People!' she protests, 'because I ceded to the sweet impressions of nature, and in imitating the charming weakness of all the women of the court of France, I surrendered to the sweet impulsion of love...you hold me, as it were, captive within your walls?'" Goodman elaborated that in one libel, Marie-Antoinette is described as generously providing details of her husband's "incapacity in the venereal act" and that her lust resulted in her taking an aristocratic beauty Yolande de Polastron, the Duchess of Polignac (1749–1793), "into [her] service" and later specifying that what makes sex with a woman so appealing is "Adroit in the art of stimulating the clitoris"; Marie-Antoinette is described as having stated that La Polignac's attentions produced "one of those rare pleasures that cannot be used up because it can be repeated as many times as one likes".

By the time the Victorian era arrived, cited Zimmerman, "tribadism tended to be constructed as a lower class and non-Western phenomenon and often was associated with the supposed degeneration of prostitutes and criminals". By the twentieth century, "tribade had been supplanted" by the terms sapphist, lesbian, invert, and homosexual, as tribade had become too archaic to use. Fricatrice, a synonym for tribade that also refers to rubbing but has a Latin rather than a Greek root, appeared in English texts as early as 1605 (in Ben Jonson's Volpone). Its usage suggests that it was more colloquial and more pejorative than tribade. Variants include the Latinized confricatrice and English rubster.

=== Sexual practices ===
==== Sex positions and other aspects ====
Tribadism is a common sexual practice among women who have sex with women (WSW). Although the term tribadism is often applied to the act of vulva-to-vulva stimulation, it encompasses a variety of sexual activity. In addition to the scissoring position, which involves the partners interlocking their legs in a position similar to the shape of scissors and pressing their vulvas together, tribadism may involve the missionary position, the woman on top position, the doggy style position or others, or simple movement of the woman's vulva against her partner's thigh, stomach, buttocks, arm, or another body part. Sometimes "mutuality and reciprocation tend not to be the main objective, although satisfaction for both partners through different means most definitely is its aim". Women who enjoy or prefer tribadism report finding pleasure from its allowance of whole-body contact, the experience of timing hip movement and feeling their partner's motions without manual stimulation, which is considered exciting, erotic and a much easier way to achieve orgasm due to ample clitoral stimulation.

Women who enjoy tribadism share methods through verbal and text communication, and they emphasize the importance of repeated body movement (reciprocation) to reach orgasm, such as rubbing back and forth and bumping up and down. It means tribadism is more than just local-clitoral stimulation (aim); it should involve every inch of the vulva. Because the sexual pleasure of tribadism is influenced by the psychological sense of satisfaction and happiness from feeling the individual's private body parts through female genital contact, interaction, and communication between the two individuals.

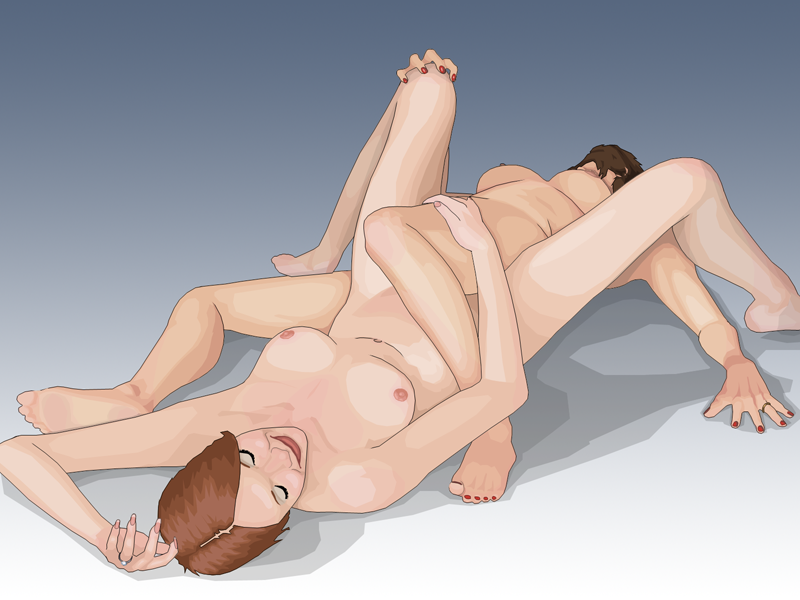
Two women engaged in the scissoring position, a position debated among lesbians

Some lesbian and bisexual women do not engage in the scissoring position because they find or think it would be physically uncomfortable. They may also think it is a misconception that lesbians engage in the act and is therefore not representative of lesbian sexual practices, attributing it more so to the male fantasies of the heterosexual porn industry. By contrast, some sources, including Shere Hite's 1976 and 1981 research, indicate that women may enjoy performing the scissoring position with other women because it is a variation of vulva-to-vulva contact or can allow for maximum such contact and therefore an elevated level of intimacy.

Scissoring is commonly used as an umbrella term for all forms of tribadism, and many lesbian and bisexual women are unaware that some of the sexual acts they include in their lovemaking are aspects of and are formally labeled tribadism, as tribadism is commonly omitted from mainstream sex research. Scholar Judith Halberstam stated, "If we trace the use of the term forward into present, we find that tribadism is one of those rarely discussed but often practiced sexual activities, and the silence that surrounds it now is as puzzling as the discourse it produced in earlier centuries." Halberstam added that Sigmund Freud "had nothing to say" with regard to the topic, "and few contemporary lesbian sex books even discuss it".

According to older studies, "approximately one-third of lesbian women used tribadism, or body contact, as a means of achieving orgasm (Saghir & Robins, 1973; Jay & Young, 1977)". Masters and Johnson's 1979 study on lesbian sexual practices found that lesbians tend to do more overall genital stimulation than direct clitoral stimulation, which is also often the case for heterosexual relationships. Vaginal or anal penetration with dildos or other sex toys is less commonly practiced among lesbians and other WSW. In 1987, a non-scientific study (Munson) "was conducted of more than 100 members of a lesbian social organization in Colorado" and "[w]hen asked what techniques they used in their last 10 lovemaking sessions, 100% were for kissing, sucking on nipples, and manual stimulation of the clitoris; more than 90% reported French kissing, oral sex, and fingers inserted into the vagina; and 80% reported tribadism".

In 2003, Julia V Bailey and her research team published data based on a sample from the United Kingdom of 803 lesbian and bisexual women attending two London lesbian sexual health clinics and 415 WSW from a community sample; the study reported that 85% of the women engaged in tribadism (which included genital-to-genital contact or rubbing genitals against another part of a partner's body). 50% engaged in the genital-genital form. Like older studies, vaginal penetration with dildos, or with other sex toys, among the women was rare.

==== Safe sex ====
As with any exchange of body fluids during sexual activities, genital-to-genital tribadism is a high-risk sexual practice because it may transfer sexually transmitted infections (STIs) if those are present in one or more of the partners. Genital-genital and genital-body contact (including tribadism) can spread STIs such as human papillomavirus (HPV), pubic lice (crabs) and herpes.

Safe sex options, such as using a dental dam or a cut-open condom, may be practiced. However, there "is no good evidence" that using a dental dam reduces STI transmission risks between women who have sex with women; studies show that using a dental dam as a protection barrier is rarely practiced, and that, among [women who have sex with women], this may be because the individuals have "limited knowledge about the possibilities of STI transmission or [feel] less vulnerable to STIs [such as HIV]".

In terms of the Female Sexual Function Index (FSFI), sexual behaviors between women such as tribadism are neglected.

=== Popular culture and other media ===
Tribadism has been referenced in various aspects of popular culture. The glam pop band Scissor Sisters derived their name from the scissoring position. Jake Shears of the group stated that while many of their songs have gay themes, they do not want to be labeled a gay band; they "are first and foremost a pop band". Other bands named after tribadism include lesbian punk band Tribe 8 and all-male group Scissorfight.

Genital–genital tribadism was depicted three times during the "D-Yikes!" episode of the cartoon South Park, referred to in the episode as scissoring. The episode is credited with having brought more recognition to the act of scissoring. The term additionally received mainstream recognition after the episode "Duets" of the television series Glee had characters Santana Lopez and Brittany S. Pierce reference scissoring while making out. The scene received some criticism for possibly being inappropriate for children.

In 2010, in response to California State University, Long Beach refusing to advertise the play The Night of the Tribades on the Seventh Street marquee because of the word tribades in its title, approximately 24 theater arts majors protested in front of Brotman Hall by simulating tribadism (including scissoring). "When you put tribade into a Google search image, apparently it comes up with the word tribadism, which is a sex act and they decided it was inappropriate," stated one student.

Tribadism and other lesbian sex scenes are featured in the 2013 film Blue Is the Warmest Colour. The scenes were the subject of debate among lesbians and critics, with the depiction of scissoring being one of the acts that were criticized; in an interview surveying a small panel of lesbian women, one of the women, who was skeptical that lesbian sexual activity included scissoring at all, seemed more open to the idea of a reverse cowgirl position of scissoring; another woman had engaged in the reverse cowgirl position of scissoring. Smith et al. argued that while the portrayal of scissoring in Blue Is the Warmest Colour may be considered "entirely lesbian" and "expunging men" because it is non-penetrative sex between women, "the positions chosen seem based more on their ease to photograph/film in a way that provides maximum exposure of both female bodies, as well as an inability to imagine, or depict within heterosexual representational norms, fulfilling sex without direct genital-on-genital contact."

The 2016 film Blood of the Tribades is a lesbian-themed vampire story examining gender politics and bigotry.

== Among female bonobos ==
Female-female genital sex is not exclusive to humans. Females of the bonobo species also engage in this act, usually referred to by primatologists as GG rubbing (genital-to-genital). "Perhaps the bonobo's most typical sexual pattern, undocumented in any other primate, is genito-genital rubbing (or GG rubbing) between adult females," stated primatologist Frans de Waal. "One female facing another clings with arms and legs to a partner that, standing on both hands and feet, lifts her off the ground."

In bonobos, the clitoris is larger and more externalized than in most mammals. Ethologist Jonathan Balcombe states that bonobos rub their clitorises together rapidly for ten to twenty seconds, and this behavior, "which may be repeated in rapid succession, is usually accompanied by grinding, shrieking, and clitoral engorgement"; on average, female bonobos engage in genital–genital rubbing "about once every two hours".

According to the researchers from various academic institutions they found "After sexual interactions with other females, female bonobos also displayed higher levels of oxytocin in the urine. The same, however, did not occur after they had mated with males", and they suggested this biological reaction of female bonobo may derive a strong influence on the community. "Female bonobos, it seems, derive more pleasure from sexual engagement with other females. This may also allow them to establish themselves as equal to the males in the community — by sticking together".

== See also ==
- Human female sexuality
- Lesbian erotica
- Non-penetrative sex
- Sexual practices between women
- Women who have sex with women
- Musahaqah
