= Sexual practices between women =

Sexual activity between women

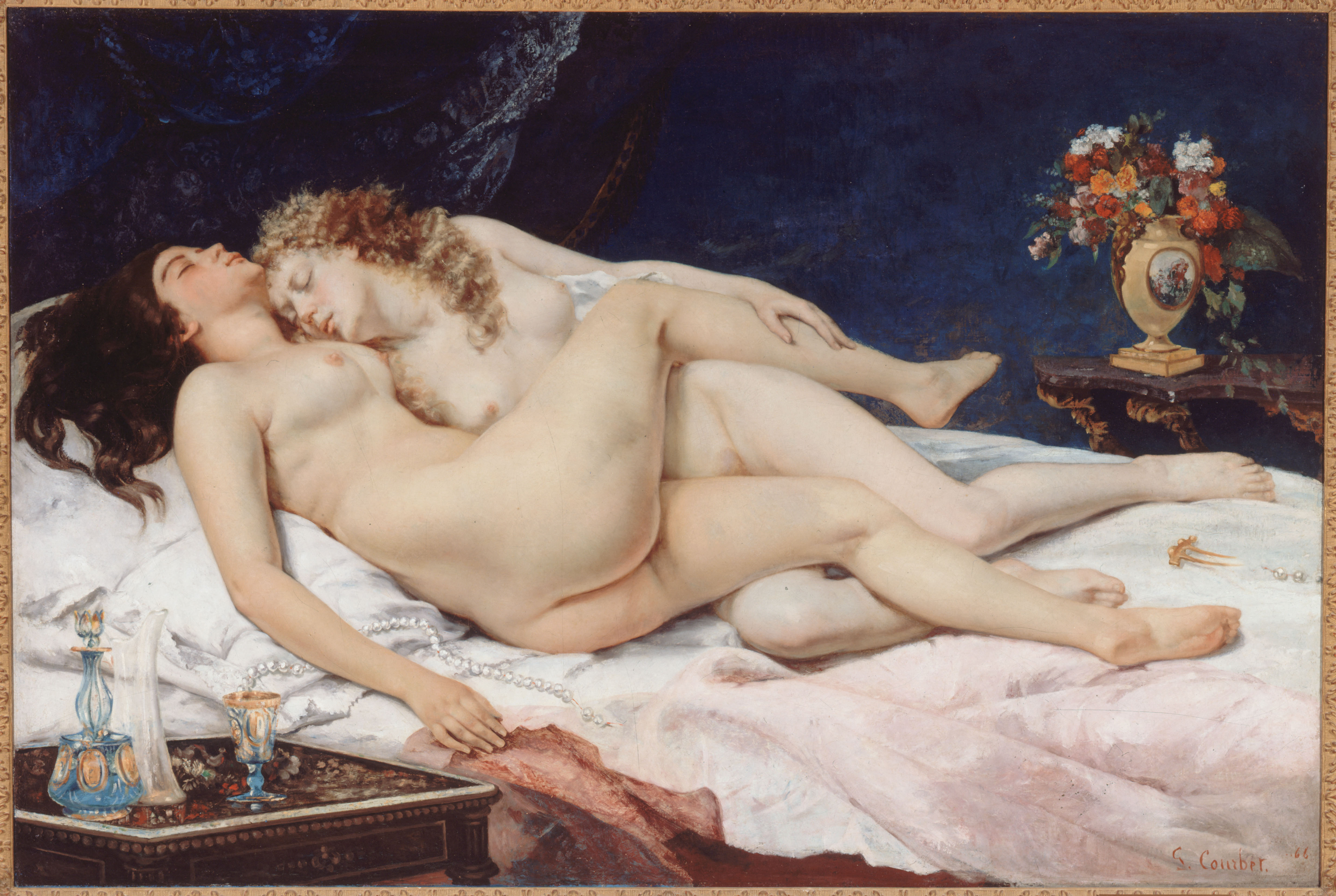
Le Sommeil (The Sleepers) by Gustave Courbet (1866)

Sexual activities involving women who have sex with women (WSW), regardless of their sexual orientation or sexual identity, can include oral sex, manual sex, or tribadism. Sex toys may be used.

Romantic or sexual interpersonal relationships are often subject to sexual desire and arousal, which then leads to sexual activity for sexual release. A physical expression of intimacy between women depends on the context of the relationship along with social, cultural and other influences. In some countries, lesbian sexual practices are criminalized alongside gay sexual practices.

== Behaviors ==
=== General ===
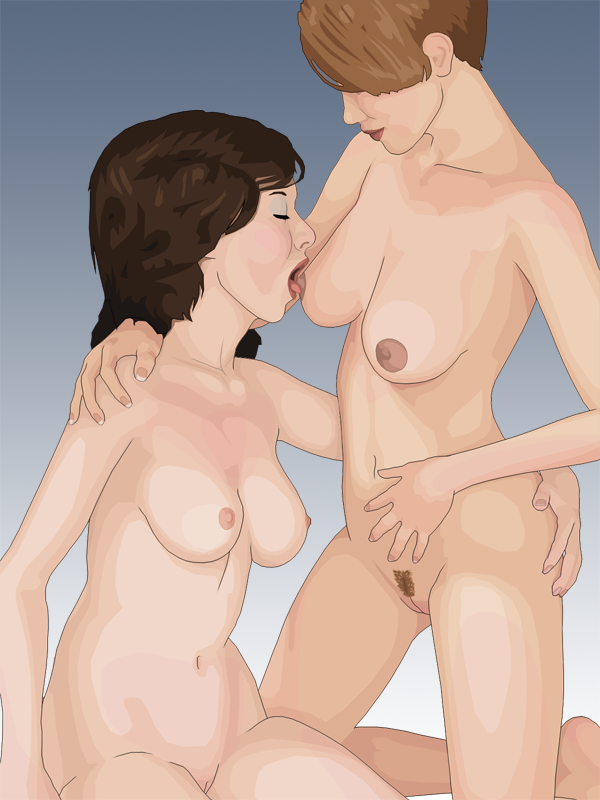
A woman licking her partner's nipple

Commonly, women engage in displays of affection, such as kissing on the cheek or hugging. Sex educator and feminist Shere Hite stated that one of her female research subjects had written, "Sex with a woman includes: touching, kissing, smiling, looking serious, embracing, talking, digital intercourse, caressing, looking, cunnilingus, undressing, remembering later, making sounds, sometimes gently biting, sometimes crying, and breathing and sighing together."

Disrobing before a partner, removing the clothing of a partner or performing acts of physical intimacy, such as the touching of a partner's erogenous zones by the use of hands, tongue or rest of the mouth, may be regarded as indicators of the partner's desire for sexual activity and an erotic stimulus or turn-on (sexual arousal), which may generate erotic sensations in both partners. Allowing such acts of physical intimacy, especially the stimulation of a partner's breasts and nipples, is an indication of reciprocal interest in sexual activity.

A woman's mouth, lips and tongue may be sensitive erogenous zones; they are commonly used by partners during the preliminary stages and throughout a sexual activity, whether for kissing, sucking, licking or specifically for oral sex. The stimulation of a partner's breasts, including oral or manual stimulation of the nipples, is a form of foreplay. Breast and nipple stimulation of women is a common aspect of sexual activity. The stimulation of a woman's nipples promotes the production and release of oxytocin and prolactin. During the stimulation of the nipples, large amounts of oxytocin are released, which would normally prepare the breast for breastfeeding. Besides creating maternal feelings in a woman, it also decreases her anxiety and increases bonding and trust.

An orgasm includes involuntary actions, including muscular spasms in multiple areas of the body, a general euphoric sensation, and, frequently, body movements and vocalizations. The period after orgasm, known as a refractory period, is often a relaxing experience, attributed to the release of the neurohormones oxytocin and prolactin. Although it is generally reported that women do not experience a refractory period and can thus have an additional orgasm (or multiple orgasms) soon after the first one, some sources state that women are capable of experiencing a refractory period because they may have a moment after orgasm in which further sexual stimulation does not produce excitement.

=== Oral sex, manual sex and tribadism ===
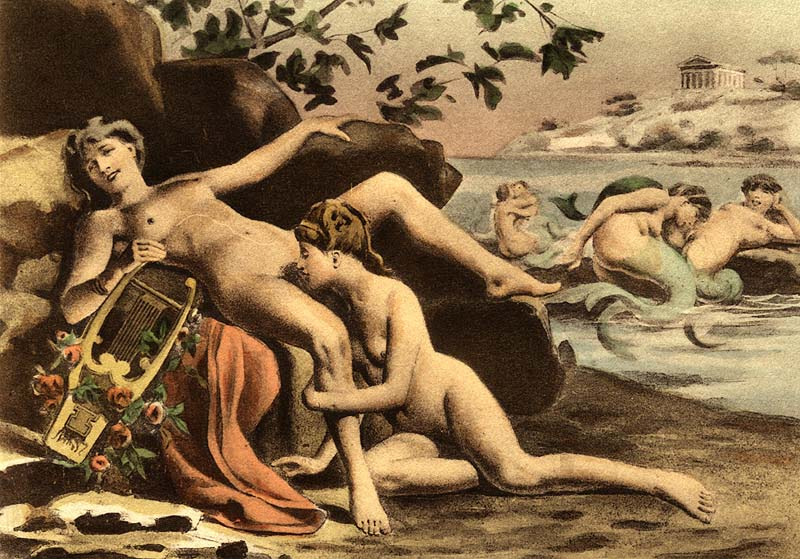
On Lesbos, Sappho partakes in cunnilingus (by Édouard-Henri Avril)

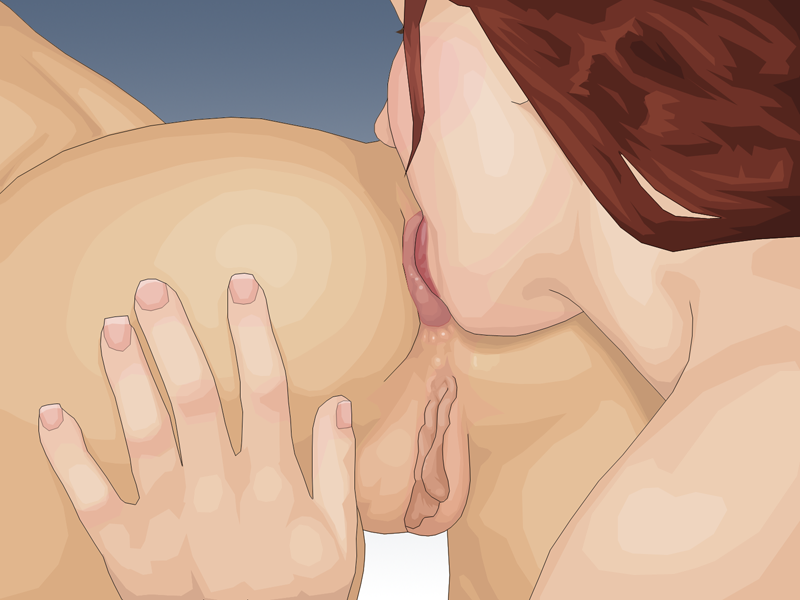
Woman performing anilingus on her partner

Stimulation of the clitoris or other parts of the vulva by using the lips and tongue (cunnilingus) is a commonly practiced form of oral sex between women. Using the tongue and lips to stimulate the anus (anilingus) is less often practiced.

Manual sex between women involves fingering, which is the use of one's fingers to stimulate someone else's vulva or vagina, as well as anal fingering, which is using the fingers to stimulate another person's anus. Stimulation of the vulva, and in particular the clitoris, is the most common way for a woman to reach and achieve an orgasm. Massaging inside of the vagina may stimulate a very sensitive area called the G-spot. For some women, stimulating the G-spot area creates a more intense orgasm than direct clitoral stimulation. For deeper vaginal, anal or oral penetration, a dildo, strap-on dildo or other sex toys may be used.

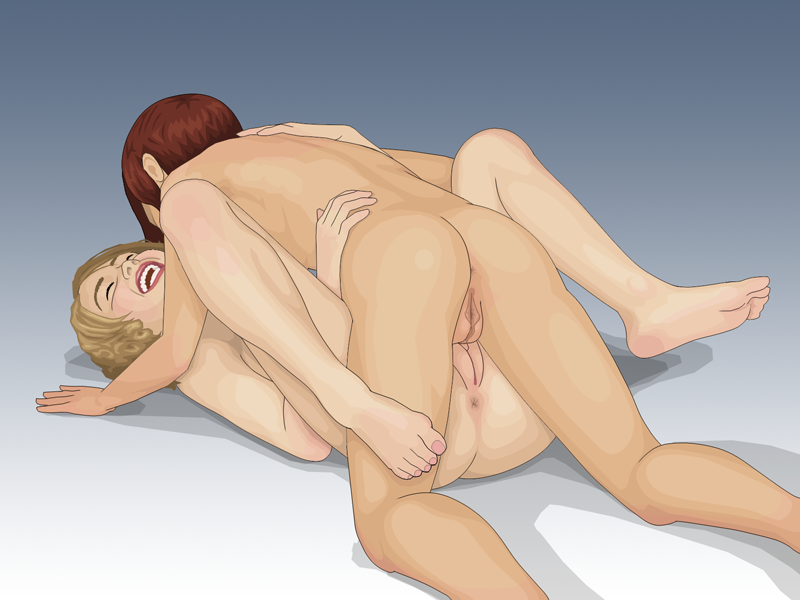
Two women rubbing their vulvas together in the missionary position

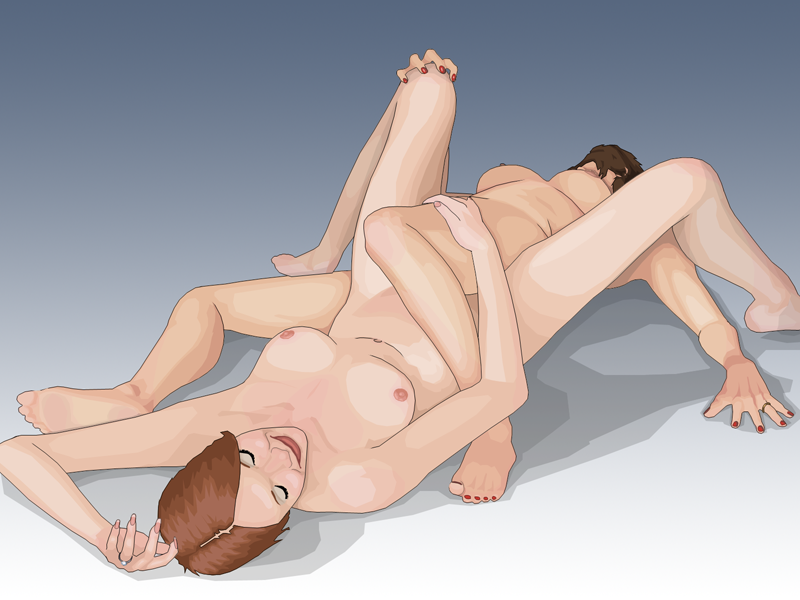
Tribadism in the scissoring position

Tribadism is a common non-penetrative sexual act between women and is a form of frottage. It typically involves vulva-to-vulva contact or a woman rubbing her vulva against her partner's thigh, stomach, buttocks, arm, or other body parts. Often known by its "scissoring" position, this may be achieved in a number of sex positions, including missionary, woman on top, doggy style, or other positions. It may be accompanied by fingering or penetration with a dildo.

=== Dominance, submission and BDSM ===
On occasion, for variety, or on a more regular or routine basis, a woman may assume a passive role during sexual activity and leave it to her partner to provide their sexual satisfaction, which can also be an aspect of dominance and submission. For example, a person in a doggy style position may be passive and open to a variety of sex acts, generally at the choice of the active partner, such as fingering from behind, massage or stimulation of erogenous zones, including the genitals, nipples, or buttocks, and receiving a playful spank to the buttocks. The active partner can also introduce a sex toy, such as a dildo or vibrator, into the vagina or anus.

To ensure passivity and to enhance the feeling of or actual female submission, a partner may also take part in bondage (such as wearing handcuffs) or in other BDSM activities. During sexual bondage, the restrained partner is generally open to a variety of sex acts and cannot interfere in the ensuing sexual activity. She is dependent for her sexual satisfaction on the actions of her partner, who can choose the type and pace of the sexual activity and can introduce sex toys. For example, a pecker gag can be used to gag the restrained partner as well as to require her to suck during sexual activity in a similar manner to an adult pacifier. The active partner has the role of treating the restrained partner as a sex object to be used for her own sexual satisfaction. The active partner may herself derive sexual satisfaction from providing her sex partner with sexual satisfaction and bringing her to orgasm.

== Research and views ==
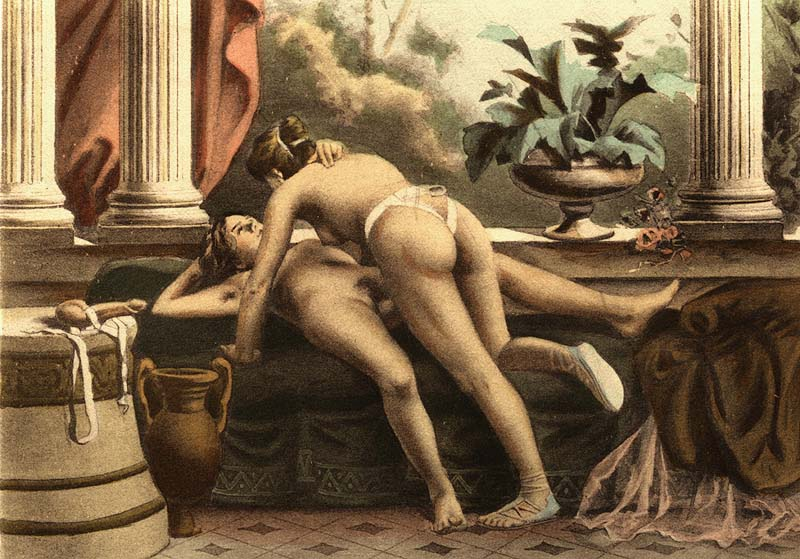
Late 19th-century painting by Édouard-Henri Avril showing the use of a strap-on dildo

In 1953, Alfred Kinsey's Sexual Behavior in the Human Female documented that, over the previous five years of sexual activity, 78% of women had orgasms in 60% to 100% of sexual encounters with other women, compared with 55% for heterosexual sex. Kinsey attributed this difference to female partners knowing more about women's sexuality and how to optimize women's sexual satisfaction than male partners do. Similarly, studies by several scholars, including Masters and Johnson, concluded that lesbian sexual behaviors more often have qualities associated with sexual satisfaction than their heterosexual counterparts, or that female partners are more likely to emphasize the emotional aspects of sex. Masters and Johnson's 1979 study on lesbian sexual practices concluded that lesbian sexual encounters include more full-body sexual contact, rather than genital-focused contact, less preoccupation or anxiety about achieving orgasm, more sexual assertiveness and communication about sexual needs, longer lasting sexual encounters and greater satisfaction with the overall quality of one's sexual life.

Studies by Pepper Schwartz and Philip Blumstein (1983) and Diane Holmberg and Karen L. Blair (2009) contradict research indicating that women in same-sex relationships are more sexually satisfied than their heterosexual counterparts. Schwartz concluded that lesbian couples in committed relationships have less sex than any other type of couple, and that they generally experience less sexual intimacy the longer the relationship lasts, though this study has been subject to debate. Holmberg and Blair's study, on the other hand, published in The Journal of Sex Research, found that women in same-sex relationships enjoyed identical sexual desire, sexual communication, sexual satisfaction, and satisfaction with orgasm as their heterosexual counterparts. Additional research by Blair & Pukall (2014) reported similar findings, such that women in same-sex relationships reported similar levels of overall sexual satisfaction and lower levels of sexual frequency. However, this recent study also reported that women in same-sex relationships spent significantly longer amounts of time on individual sexual encounters - often spending upwards of two hours on an individual encounter. Consequently, what lesbians may lack in frequency, they may make up for with longer durations.

With regard to the ease or difficulty of achieving orgasm, Hite's research (while subject to methodological limitations) showed that most women need clitoral (exterior) stimulation for orgasm, which can be "easy and strong, given the right stimulation" and that the need for clitoral stimulation in addition to knowing one's own body is the reason that most women reach orgasm more easily by masturbation. Replicating Kinsey's findings, studies by scholars such as Peplau, Fingerhut and Beals (2004) and Diamond (2006) indicate that lesbians have orgasms more often and more easily in sexual interactions than heterosexual women do.

Preferences for specific sexual practices among female same-sex relationships have also been studied. Masters and Johnson concluded that vaginal penetration with dildos is rare and lesbians tend to perform more overall genital stimulation than direct clitoral stimulation, which is also often the case for heterosexual relationships. Concerning oral sex, the common belief that all women who have sex with women engage in cunnilingus contrasts research on the subject. Some lesbian or bisexual women dislike oral sex because they do not like the experience or due to psychological or social factors, such as finding it unclean. Other lesbian or bisexual women believe it is a necessity or largely defines lesbian sexual activity. Lesbian couples are more likely to consider a woman's dislike of cunnilingus as a problem than heterosexual couples are, and it is common for them to seek therapy to overcome inhibitions regarding it.

Some lesbians practice anal sex. In 1987, a non-scientific study (Munson) was conducted of more than 100 members of a lesbian social organization in Colorado. When asked what techniques they used in their last 10 sexual encounters, 100% reported kissing, sucking on breasts, and manual stimulation of the clitoris; more than 90% reported French kissing, oral sex, and fingers inserted into the vagina; and 80% reported tribadism. Lesbians in their 30s were twice as likely as other age groups to engage in anal stimulation (with a finger or dildo). A 2014 study of partnered lesbian women in Canada and the U.S. found that 7% engaged in anal stimulation or penetration at least once a week; about 10% did so monthly and 70% did not at all.

In 2003, Julia Bailey and her research team published data based on a sample from the United Kingdom of 803 lesbian and bisexual women attending two London lesbian sexual health clinics and 415 women who have sex with women (WSW) from a community sample; the study reported that the most commonly cited sexual practices between women "were oral sex, digital vaginal penetration, mutual masturbation, and tribadism (frottage with genital-to-genital contact or rubbing of the genitals against another part of the partner's body), each of which occurred in 85% of [women who have sex with women]". Like older studies, the data also showed that vaginal penetration with dildos, or with other sex toys, among women who have sex with women is rare. A 2012 online survey of 3,116 women who have sex with women, published in The BMJ, found the majority of women reporting a history of genital rubbing (99.8%), vaginal fingering (99.2%), genital scissoring (90.8%), cunnilingus (98.8%) and vibrator use (74.1%).

== Health risks ==
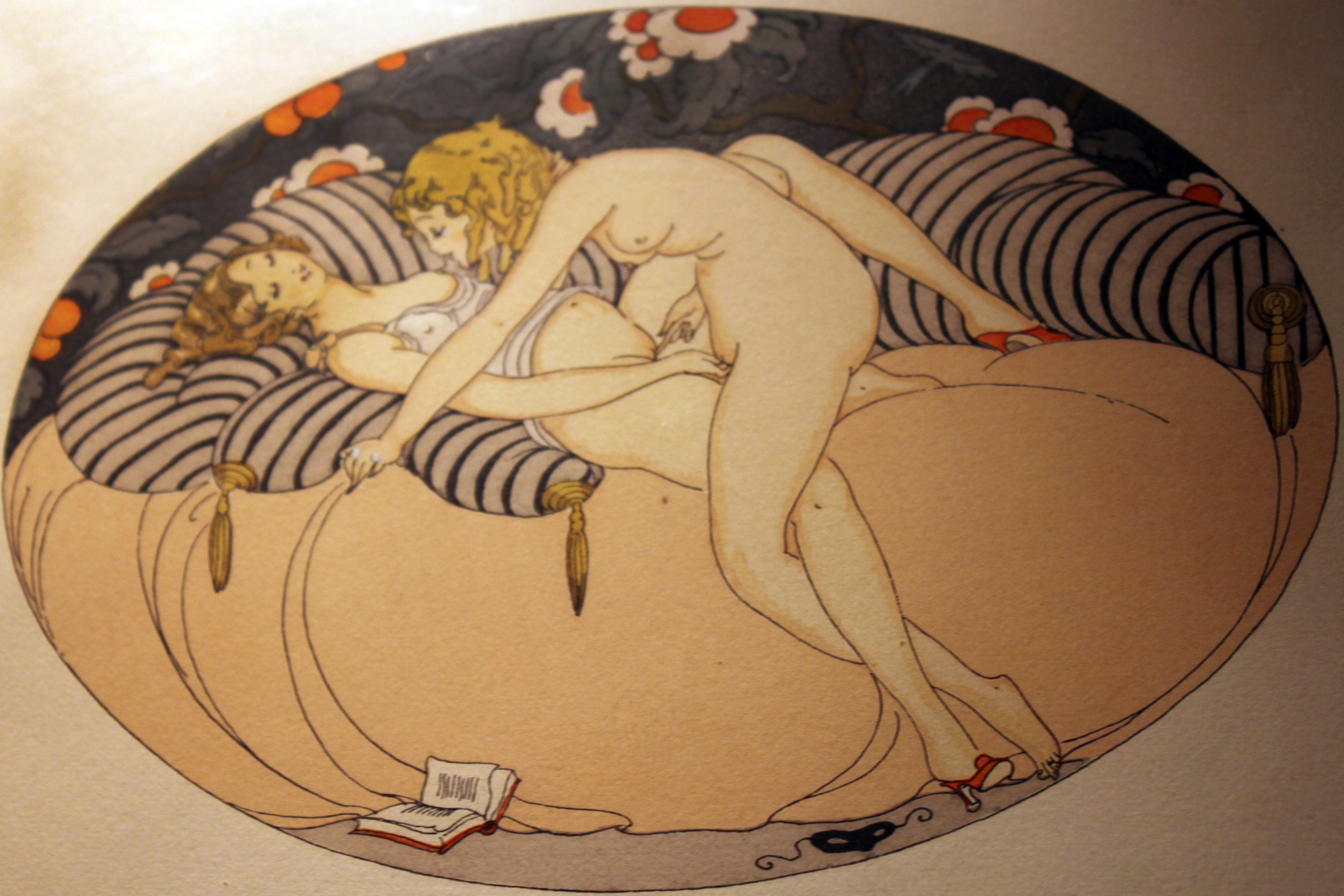
A 1925 Gerda Wegener painting of two women engaging in mutual manual stimulation

Like most sexual activity, lesbian sexual activities can carry risks of sexually transmitted infections (STIs), such as genital herpes or other pathogenic infections. When lesbian sexual activity is of a non-penetrative nature, the risk of exchange of bodily fluids is generally lower and therefore the incidence of transmission of sexually transmitted infections is also relatively low, especially when contrasted by penetrative sexual activities between male–female or male–male couples. The use of the same sex toys by more than one person increases the risk of transmitting such infections. Though the risk for HIV transmission from lesbian sexual activity is significantly lower than it is for HIV transmission from male–female and male–male sexual activity, it is present. HIV can be spread through bodily fluids, such as blood (including menstrual blood), vaginal fluid and breast milk, or by oral sex if the person has cuts or sores in her mouth or poor oral hygiene. Bacterial vaginosis, which doubles the risk of contracting sexually transmitted infections like HIV/AIDS, occurs more often in lesbian couples.

The Centers for Disease Control and Prevention (CDC) did not recognize female-to-female transmission as a possible method of HIV infection until 1995. The CDC reported there is little data available regarding the risk of spreading sexually transmitted infections between women. However, the CDC states that pathogens such as metronidazole-resistant trichomoniasis, genotype-concordant HIV, human papillomavirus (HPV, which has been linked to nearly all cases of cervical cancer) and syphilis can be spread through sexual contact between women. While the rates of these pathologies are unknown, one study showed 30% of lesbians and bisexual women had medical histories with sexually transmitted infections. This does not mean that sexually active lesbians are exposed to higher health risks than the general population. Health Canada noted "the prevalence of all types of HPV (cancer and non-cancer-causing) in different groups of Canadian women ranges from 20%–33%" and an American university study found 60% of sexually active females were infected with HPV at some time within a three-year period.

The American Family Physician suggests that lesbian and bisexual women "cover sex toys that penetrate more than one person's vagina or anus with a new condom for each person" and to "consider using different toys for each person", to use a protection barrier (for example, a latex sheet, dental dam, cut-open condom or plastic wrap) during oral sex and to "use latex or vinyl gloves and lubricant for any manual sex that might cause bleeding unprotected contact with a sexual partner's menstrual blood and with any visible genital lesions". However, there "is no good evidence" that using a dental dam reduces STI transmission risks between women who have sex with women; studies show that using a dental dam as a protection barrier is rarely practiced, and that, among women who have sex with women, this may be because the individuals have "limited knowledge about the possibilities of STI transmission or [feel] less vulnerable to STIs [such as HIV]".

== Legality ==
Sex between women is criminalized in some jurisdictions. In 2016, the Human Dignity Trust reported that at least 44 countries criminalized sex between women, compared to 76 that criminalized sex between men. In ten countries, these bans had been recently enacted. There is no country that criminalizes same-sex activity only between females. The reduced criminalization of same-sex conduct between women has been due to a belief that eroticism between women is not really "sex" and that it does not have the power to tempt women away from heterosexuality. Lesbian and bisexual women are also vulnerable to forced marriage.

== See also ==
- Human female sexuality
- Lesbian erotica
- LGBTQ sex education
- Sexual practices between men
- Women who have sex with women
