= Lesbian bed death =

Popular concept about lesbian sexuality

Lesbian bed death is the concept that lesbian couples in committed relationships have less sex than any other type of couple the longer the relationship lasts, and generally experience less sexual intimacy as a consequence. It may also be defined as a drop-off in sexual activity that occurs two years into a long-term lesbian relationship.

The concept is based on 1983 research by social psychologist Philip Blumstein and sociologist Pepper Schwartz, published in American Couples: Money, Work, Sex, which found that lesbian couples reported lower numbers when asked "About how often during the last year have you and your partner had sex relations?" The research has been criticized for its methodology and because sexual activity decreases for all long-term couples regardless of sexual orientation. Analyses of the concept have therefore regarded it as a popular myth. The concept was mentioned by JoAnn Loulan in Lesbian Sex (1984), although her research was more focused on debunking the idea that lesbians are inherently less sexual people than others. A German study has shown that the female sex drive greatly diminishes once she is in a secure relationship. From an evolutionary psychological point of view, lesbian couples are expected to seek sex less frequently than heterosexual or gay male couples. However, this occurs in men as well, as per the Coolidge effect.

== Origin of the term ==
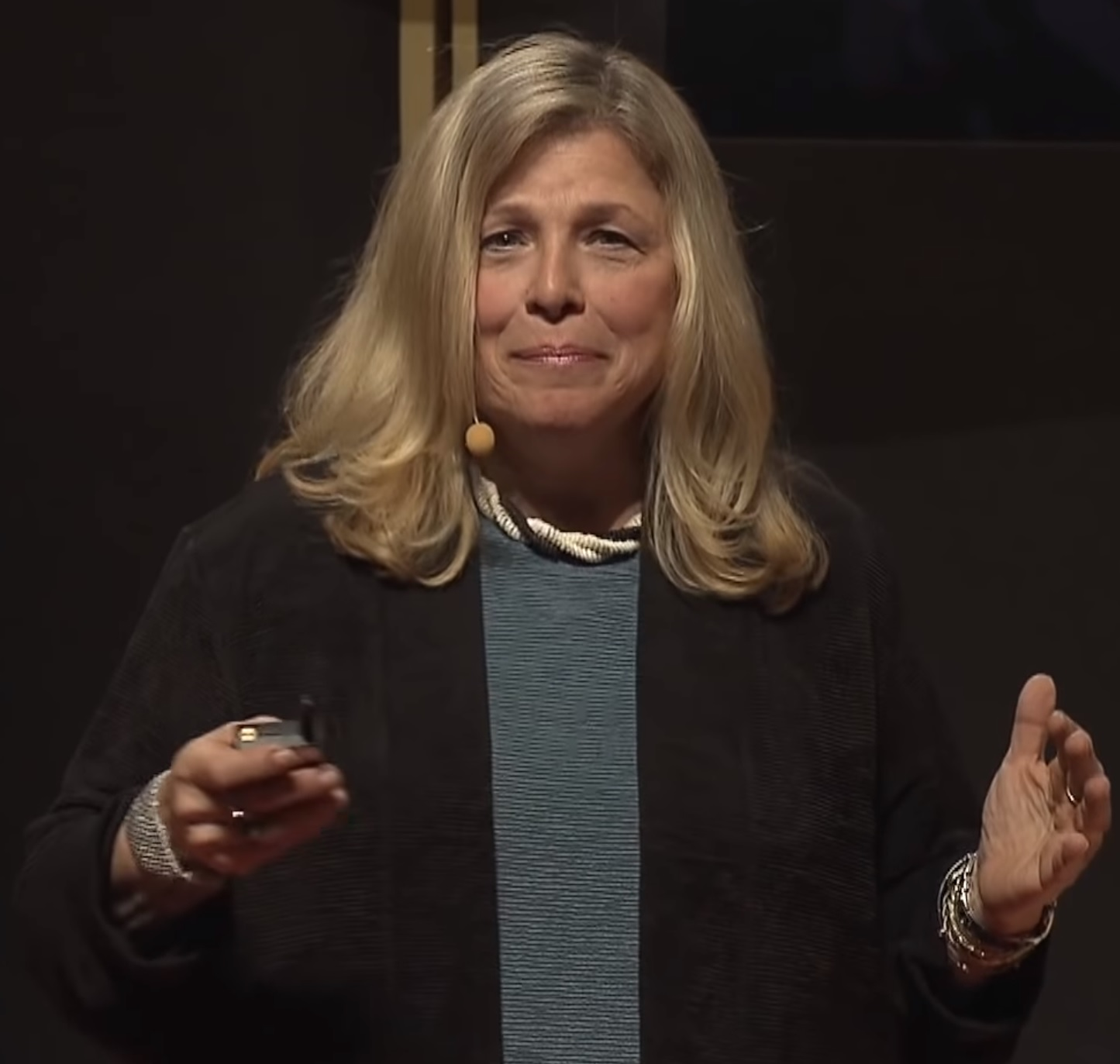
Pepper Schwartz at TEDxRainier (2011)

Pepper Schwartz is credited with coining the term lesbian bed death. History scholar John D'Emilio heard lesbian activist Jade McGleughlin use the term in a speech at the "Sex and Politics Forum" held at George Washington University during the 1987 National March on Washington for Lesbian and Gay Rights, which psychologist and sex therapist Suzanne Iasenza believes was the first time it was publicly uttered. When asked about the term, McGleughlin stated that she believed the phrase "coalesced spontaneously among a group of lesbians for whom it captured an experience particular to that moment." She later said the term had "collapsed the complexity of lesbian sexuality".

== Research ==
=== Blumstein and Schwartz's findings ===
In the early 1980s, Philip Blumstein and Pepper Schwartz conducted a survey on American relationships, sponsored by the Russell Sage Foundation and the National Science Foundation. The questionnaire covered various aspects of couples' relationships, such as work, sex, children, finances, and decision-making. Initially, 12,000 volunteer couples, including 788 lesbian couples, filled out questionnaires. Of these, 300 couples in Seattle, San Francisco, and New York were selected for a more in-depth interview. The findings were published in 1983 as American Couple: Money, Work, Sex. One of Blumstein and Schwartz' conclusions was that lesbian couples in committed relationships have less sex than any other type of couple (of those mentioned in the survey: heterosexual married, heterosexual co-habitating, or gay male) and that they generally experience less sexual intimacy the longer the relationship lasts.

This was based on responses to the question "About how often during the last year have you and your partner had sex relations?" The results signified less sexual activity than their counterparts. Only about one-third of lesbians in relationships of 2 years or longer had sex once a week or more; 47% of lesbians in long-term relationships had sex once a month or less, and among heterosexual married couples, only 15% had sex once a week or less. They also reported that lesbians seemed to be more limited in the range of their sexual techniques than did other couples, and that lesbian couples are less sexual as couples and as individuals than couples in the other groups.

=== Other findings and criticism ===
A 1988 study of over 1,500 lesbians found that 78% had been celibate at one time; 35% reported having been celibate for 1–5 years and 6% reported having been celibate for more than 6 years.

In her New York Times review of American Couple, Carol Tavris suggested potential bias in the Blumstein and Schwartz survey results, as most of the respondents were typically white, affluent, liberal, and well-educated. Lesbian feminist theorist Marilyn Frye also criticized the study. Frye questioned the methodology of the survey format, feeling that the survey question is too ambiguous when applied to the sexual behavior of lesbian couples. She indicated that the survey's comparison is not accurate because the focus on sexual activity back then was on whether or not a penis was inserted and if "sex relations" is interpreted too narrowly, this ambiguity could account for the finding of a statistically low frequency of sexual behavior among lesbian couples. Frye stated, "...What 85 percent of long-term, married couples do more than once a month takes on average 8 minutes to do… What we (lesbians) do that, on average, we do considerably less frequently, takes, on the average, considerably more than 8 minutes to do. Maybe about 30 minutes at least."

Lesbian couples are expected to seek sex less frequently than heterosexual or gay male couples. Scholar Waguih William IsHak stated that although lesbian bed death lacks scientific evidence, empirical data has suggested "that women ha[ve] less sexual desire than men and are more submissive in sexual interactions".

According to psychologist and scholar Letitia Anne Peplau, research studies have shown that women show less interest in sex compared to men and "lesbians report having sex less often than gay men or heterosexuals." Women in general were found to be "more willing than men to forgo sex or adhere to religious vows of celibacy". However, according to Peplau, the "available empirical database on homosexuals is relatively small"; additionally, "an adequate understanding of human sexuality may require separate analyses of sexuality in women ... based on the unique biology and life experiences" of the female sex, because researchers have "ignored activities, such as intimate kissing, cuddling, and touching, that may be uniquely important to women's erotic lives." Researchers have argued that "more attention must be paid to the impact of hormones that may have special relevance for women" and which are "linked to both sexuality and affectional bonding".

With regard to women's overall sexual behavior and sexual satisfaction, Masters and Johnson's 1979 study on lesbian sexual practices concluded that lesbian sexual behaviors more often have qualities associated with sexual satisfaction than their heterosexual counterparts, focusing on more full-body sexual contact rather than genital-focused contact, less preoccupation or anxiety about achieving orgasm, more sexual assertiveness and communication about sexual needs, longer-lasting sexual encounters and greater satisfaction with the overall quality of one's sexual life. 2004 research by Margaret Nichols found slightly less sexual behavior among lesbians than heterosexual women, but that both were sexually active approximately once a week. Several studies have indicated that lesbians have orgasms more often and more easily in sexual interactions than heterosexual women do, while a 2009 Journal of Sex Research study found that women in same-sex relationships enjoyed identical sexual desire, sexual communication, sexual satisfaction, and satisfaction with orgasm as their heterosexual counterparts. 2014 research by Blair and Pukall reported that women in same-sex relationships have similar levels of overall sexual satisfaction as their heterosexual counterparts, and slightly lower levels of sexual frequency, but also that women in same-sex relationships spend significantly longer amounts of time on individual sexual encounters, often spending upwards of two hours on an individual encounter.

Researchers Cohen and Byers stated that the majority of the lesbian bed research is old (by more than 20 years) and that its survey question "how often do you have sex?" is phallocentric and therefore the respondents were unlikely to include behaviors such as genital touching, oral-genital contact, and non-genital activities (such as kissing and whole-body contact) in their answers. In their 2014 study of the concept, approximately 600 women in long-term same-sex relationships were included. Three quarters had engaged in one or more genitally-based sexual activities at least once a week during the past month, and 88% of the women reported daily non-genital sexual activity. Both heterosexual and female same-sex couples had a decrease in frequency of genital contact, while non-genital contact had not decreased. The women in same-sex relationships also reported being sexually satisfied.

Suzanne Iasenza described the lesbian bed death concept as a "notorious drop-off in sexual activity about two years into long-term lesbian relationships". Reviewing the literature on topic, she argued that the concept should end because it relies on gender socialization theory, lacks definitional clarity and empirical validity, and because all long-term couples experience a decline in sexual frequency as the years go on. She also stated that a 1995 Advocate Survey of Lesbian Sexuality and Relationships showed that lesbian women had more enjoyable sex than most American women, but that this data did not receive the same attention as Schwartz's study.

== Society and culture ==
Following the Blumstein and Schwartz survey, many 1980s books and articles by lesbian practitioners were written about lesbian sexuality, by well-known clinicians such as Marny Hall, JoAnn Loulan, and Marge Nichols, dealing with inhibited sexual desire, lack of sexual initiation and low sexual self-esteem in regards to lesbian sexuality. Nichols said that the impact "of these studies on the perception of lesbians, notably by lesbians themselves, was enormous: in a word, lesbians came to be seen as less sexual than other women". The term lesbian bed death was well-established by the early 1990s in the gay and lesbian community, and was the subject of jokes, dismay, and intense debate. Nichols stated explanations for lesbian bed death consisted of inhibited sexual desire as a result of internalized homophobia and "the idea of 'merging' or 'fusion' in lesbian couples (Burch, 1987). The 'urge to merge' was already stronger in women than in men, so two women in a relationship would result in an overly close connection, one so familiar that sex would come to resemble incest, thus inhibiting its expression."

When asked about the term, lesbian comedian Kate Clinton said that she often refers to lesbians not as a same-sex relationship but rather a "some-sex relationship", further reinforcing the idea that lesbian couples are not as sexually active as their heterosexual counterparts.

=== Criticism ===
Various writers have called lesbian bed death a myth. Nikki Dowling of The Frisky argued that the definition of sexual activity back in the 1980s was mainly limited to penile-vaginal sex, and that this has affected lesbians' definition of sex since some wonder if two women having sex is a valid act. She surmised that lesbian bed death "is probably only sticking around" due to lesbophobia. Winnie McCroy of The Village Voice stated, "Although [Schwartz's] methodology and results were later challenged, the idea of lesbian bed death has taken on a life of its own, with damaging results." Dowling also described a widespread negative effect of the concept, stating that numerous websites began to crop up claiming that they can cure lesbian bed death. McCroy argued that all couples experience a decrease in sexual intensity after the early stages of a relationship have passed. Sex educator and author Tristan Taormino stated that sex gets old regardless of a couple's sexual orientation. Suzanne Iasenza said, "Read heterosexual sex therapist David Schnarch's work if you don't believe heterosexual couples grapple with similar issues." Lesbian author Felice Newman stated, "Lesbian Bed Death is the greatest disservice we ever did to our community. [...] Because in fact the statistics don't vary that much. If you're straight or you're gay, long term relationships can be challenging when it comes to sex."

== See also ==
- Boston marriage
- Cohabitation
- Domestic partnership
- Human sexuality
- Queer studies
- Seven-year itch
- Societal attitudes toward homosexuality
- U-Haul lesbian
