= Schnarch =

Schnarch is a surname. Notable people with the surname include:

- Ani Schnarch, Romanian-born Israeli-British violinist
- David Schnarch (1946–2020), American therapist, clinical psychologist and urologist
