= U-Haul lesbian =

Stereotype of lesbian relationships

The U-Haul lesbian or U-Haul syndrome is a stereotype of lesbian relationships referring to the idea that lesbians tend to move in together after a short period of time (e.g., after the second date). It suggests an extreme inclination toward committed relationships. Depending on context, the term can be considered humorous, complimentary, or pejorative.

== Origin ==
A joke that references U-Haul (a brand of self-move rental trucks and trailers) became well known in lesbian culture.

Question: What does a lesbian bring on a second date?
Answer: A U-Haul.

It is considered a staple of lesbian humor. It is often attributed to comic Lea DeLaria, who claimed in her 1997 comedy album, Box Lunch, that she had written it in 1989 — in the album, she gets the audience to yell back the punchline, showing it was already well-known at the time of recording.

Reference to a U-Haul later became a stereotype of sexual identity in the gay community. It is sometimes followed or preceded by a standard joke about gay men:

Question: What does a gay man bring on a second date?
Answer: What second date?

== Relationships ==
Psychologists note that the U-Haul joke epitomizes the perceived phenomenon of lesbians to form intense emotional connections, referred to in gay slang as an "urge to merge". Critics of this alleged tendency suggest that it is used by lesbians to avoid the risks involved with dating. In their view, an aversion to the risks of dating is linked to a stunted development of intimate relationships during the teenage years when most gays and lesbians are in the closet. With the freedom of adulthood, lesbians become drawn to U-Haul relationships, appreciating their intensity and intimacy.

Some psychologists also believe that this behavior can be unhealthy. They argue that the short dating-span bypasses serious discussion on many relationship issues prior to moving in (such as sexual compatibility or future expectations) and this can manifest itself in various problems later on.

== See also ==
- Cohabitation
- Commitment bands
- Domestic partnership
- Gay bars
- Lesbian bed death
- Queer studies
