= Perfectmatch.com =

Online dating service in Washington

- Type: Private
- Founded: August 2003; 23 years ago Seattle, Washington, U.S.
- Defunct: 2015
- Headquarters: Seattle, Washington, U.S.
- Website: perfectmatch.com

Perfectmatch.com was an online dating and relationship service based in Seattle, Washington. The company offered what it calls the "Duet Total Compatibility System (Duet)". Perfectmatch.com was co-developed by Dr. Pepper Schwartz. Duet is modeled after the Myers-Briggs test.

== History ==
Perfectmatch.com was venture capital-funded and was founded in August 2003. It was created and is managed by Duane Dahl, Cindy Henry-Dahl, and Jason McVey, who previously built and managed Kiss.com/uDate.com to over seven million members. Kiss.com/uDate was sold to InterActiveCorp (Match.com) in 2002.

Since 2003, Perfectmatch has partnered with the entertainment industry to build the Perfectmatch brand in a non-traditional manner. For example, they have partnered with iVillage, MSNBC, Oxygen Networks, Warner Bros., NBC Universal Studios, and many others. The company has also been prominently featured in these entertainment-related shows or events:

The Retirement Living Television series "Another Chance for Romance" in February 2008. Hosted by Roger Lodge, the segments also featured commentary by Dr. Pepper Schwartz, utilized the Duet Total Compatibility System, and included numerous Southern California-area members of Perfectmatch.com, all of whom paired up on blind dates using the Duet System.

In August 2007, Commission Junction published an Advertisers Case Study about Perfectmatch.com discussing how affiliate sales increased by 300 percent.

The NBC Television special in June 2007 called "The Science of Love: A Modern Dating Experiment". Dr. Pepper Schwartz and the Duet Total Compatibility System were also featured.

The 2005 Warner Bros. film, Must Love Dogs, which starred Diane Lane and John Cusack as a couple who met on Perfectmatch.com.

The company reports that an entire Valentine's special Dr. Phil Show broadcast on February 11, 2005, resulted in 207,000 women joining their site that day.

In October 2005, Perfectmatch served as the online dating service working with Live with Regis and Kelly in their efforts to assist show Production Coordinator, Lori Schulweis, during her two-week search to find her own perfect match.

Perfectmatch partnered with CBS in late 2005 to kick off the first season of How I Met Your Mother by creating a matching game of the shows characters based on the Duet Total Compatibility System and helping to stage a dating/social event in New York City at Grand Central.

Perfectmatch was the backdrop of the Lifetime Original teleplay, Perfect Romance, featuring Kathleen Quinlan, Henry Ian Cusick, and Lori Heuring. Perfect Romance originally aired in June 2004.

According to Perfectmatch's website, as of late 2015, "After a great run, Perfectmatch.com is saying goodbye for good."

== Duet Total Compatibility System ==
The service uses the so-called "Duet Total Compatibility System" which attempts to match members based on an analysis of their personality traits, values, lifestyle, and ideals. Users are required to fill out a questionnaire with approximately 100 questions, loosely based on the Myers-Briggs model, and they are then categorised according to eight characteristics. Users may then choose to look for partners whose characteristics are similar to or different from their own. In January 2006, Schwartz published the book Finding Your Perfect Match which was based upon this system.

While Schwartz claimed that the system was built on scientific principles of compatibility, that assertion has been contested. Jonathan Cohn points out that while there are studies that show that some specific similarities may increase the likelihood of a relationship being successful, "the evidence is largely contradictory". Finkel et al. review the claims and algorithms of three different online dating systems, and state that they "are not aware of any research conducted to facilitate the creation of the PerfectMatch survey or to establish the reliability or validity of the dimensions."

== Criticism ==
In 2006, Perfectmatch.com faced controversy over complaints about poor service and failure to respond to refund requests. The Washington State Attorney General's office collected 18 complaints were filed with the Better Business Bureau from 2002 to 2006. and about 30 complaints
