= Dominic Cappello =

Dominic Cappello is an American strategist, writer, designer, and educator. He is the creator of the Ten Talks book series published by Hyperion in 2000 and 2001. Oprah Winfrey created a show around the book on sex and character in October 2000, featuring parents who had used the books' approaches to family communication.

Cappello is also the author (with Susan Duron) of the parent-focused HIV prevention program "Can We Talk?" developed by the National Education Association -Health Information Network through a cooperative agreement with the Centers For Disease Control and Prevention, Division of Adolescent and School Health in 1999.

Cappello, working for the New Mexico Department of Health, developed the youth injury prevention project called the Resiliency Corps. The Resiliency Corps focused on the implementation of evidence-based youth injury, violence and substance misuse prevention strategies. The five year pilot project promoted community mobilizing around policies shown to reduce injuries and offered the course "Youth Safety, Health and Resiliency" at the University of New Mexico-Valencia.

He is the co-founder of Safety and Success Communities, a socially-engaged non-governmental non-profit organization in Santa Fe, New Mexico, focused on implementing a data-driven, cross-sector, and systemic strategy for the prevention of adverse childhood experiences and adverse social determinants of health. Cappello and Katherine Ortega Courtney, Ph.D. developed and implemented the Child Welfare Data Leaders Program, a management training program focused on data analysis, research, and continuous quality improvement for child welfare systems in New York City, Connecticut, New Mexico, and Pennsylvania. Cappello co-authored (with Katherine Ortega Courtney) Anna, Age Eight: The data-driven prevention of childhood trauma and maltreatment, published in 2018.

== Books ==
- David, Age 14: Who and what determine our children’s health, education, and future (with Katherine Ortega Courtney, PhD) ISBN 979-8368365206
- Attack of the Three-Headed Hydras (with Katherine Ortega Courtney, PhD) ISBN 979-8681836940
- 100% Community: Ensuring 10 Vital Services for Surviving and Thriving (with Katherine Ortega Courtney, PhD) ISBN 979-8637165933
- Anna, Age Eight: The data-driven prevention of childhood trauma and maltreatment (with Katherine Ortega Courtney, PhD) ISBN 1-9799-0307-7
- Ten Talks Parents Must Have With Their Children About Violence ISBN 0-7868-8549-1
- Ten Talks Parents Must Have With Their Children About Sex And Character (with Pepper Schwartz, PhD) ISBN 0-7868-8548-3
- Ten Talks Parents Must Have With Their Children About Drugs and Choices (with Xenia Becher, MSW) ISBN 0-7868-8664-1
