= Musahaqah =

Islamic legal and religious term for lesbian sex

Musaheqeh (Arabic: مساحقة) is a legal and religious term. In Islamic jurisprudence (fiqh) and under the Islamic Penal Code of Iran, musaheqeh refers to a situation in which an adult, mentally competent, and consenting woman brings her genitalia into contact with the genitalia of another woman. While there is no prescribed punishment for Musahaqah, many authorities interpret it as both a sin and a criminal offence. In Malaysia, musahaqah is considered a criminal offence by 12 states and the Federal Territory (Pahang is the only state which does not prosecute musahaqah). Depending on the state, musahaqah may be punished by fines, imprisonment (ranging from a term not exceeding three months to several years), whipping not exceeding six strokes, or some combination thereof. In Brunei, woman may be punished for musahaqah with "a fine not exceeding $40,000, imprisonment for a term not exceeding 10 years, whipping not exceeding 40 strokes or [a] combination of any two of the punishment[s]." In Iran, the prescribed punishment for musaheqeh is one hundred lashes, with no distinction made between Muslims and non-Muslims.

== See also ==
- Tribadism
