= Katherine Ortega Courtney =

American psychologist

Katherine Ortega Courtney is an American psychologist and author who co-developed the 100% Community model, a theoretical framework designed to guide the state and local work of preventing two interrelated public health and education challenges: adverse childhood experiences (ACEs) and adverse social determinants of health (SDH). As bureau chief of New Mexico's Child Protective Services Research, Assessment, and Data Bureau and developer of a data-scholars program for child welfare managers across the nation, she saw firsthand child welfare's lack of capacity to implement a data-driven strategy to prevent maltreatment by ensuring families had access to the vital services of medical care, mental health care, food security programs, and safe housing.

== Background on ACEs ==
The 100% Community model calls for state and local strategies that go upstream to prevent ACEs and ACEs-related trauma before they occur. ACEs are ten forms of abuse and neglect that occur in the home, first identified in The ACEs Study in 1998 by Felitti, Anda and team. ACEs can lead to trauma and substance use disorders linked with low school achievement, lack of job readiness, domestic violence, child welfare involvement, and other lifelong effects.

There are also economic costs that ACEs incur. The ACEs Study called for reforms in public health and providing parents with family services shown to increase family functioning and prevent maltreatment. The study's recommendation did not lead to federal, state, or local policies that would ensure vital services to prevent ACEs. Instead, ACEs became viewed by healthcare providers and educators as a problem that could be addressed after ACEs and ACEs-related trauma occurred, through a practice called trauma-informed practice. The 100% Community model provides to local stakeholders, including elected officials, the strategies to ensure all families have access to the services shown to prevent ACEs and treat ACEs-related trauma, including healthcare.

== Background on social determinants of health ==
The article "A Critical Assessment of the Adverse Childhood Experiences Study at 20 Years" called for promoting an ACEs prevention strategy that was guided by an understanding of the social determinants of health, which is the environment children grow up in and includes the services that determine one's health, safety, education and quality of life.

These services include medical care, mental healthcare, food security programs, affordable housing, transportation, parent supports, early childhood learning programs, fully-resourced community schools with health centers, youth mentor programs, and job training.

The research focused on building the positive social determinants of health identifies not only vital family services but state and local policies that determine environmental health, social justice, cultural and faith-based social supports, and education from pre-K through higher education that aligns with the job market. The social determinants of health is a concept that became popularized in public health circles in the 1970s yet a criticism is that public health leaders have not articulated a blueprint for transforming the adverse social determinants of health (lack of services and policies protecting resident's health) into the positive social determinants of health There exists a problem in policy circles, as the advocates for the positive SDH may lack a cohesive definition of SDH and specific policies that policymakers can support on the federal, state, and local levels. The goal of the 100% Community model is to provide goals and processes for improving vital services that represent the social determinants of health. The model articulates a public policy process that provides a roadmap for elected leaders to follow with policy implementation on every level of government.

== Advocacy ==
Courtney is currently a co-director of the Anna, Age Eight Institute at New Mexico State University, the sponsor of the 100% New Mexico initiative. Her doctorate work at Texas Christian University was in experimental psychology focused on substance abuse treatment and prevention. She is also the co-author, with Dominic Cappello, of Anna, Age Eight: The data-driven prevention of childhood trauma and maltreatment.

Courtney's work focuses on the data-driven prevention of ACEs and SDH guide state and local leadership in their work transforming the adverse social determinants of health into positive ones, thus reducing rates of ACEs, ACEs-related trauma, low school achievement, substance use disorders, and other costly public health and education challenges.

Courtney's work in social change also calls for transparency in government to increase trust, responsiveness, and effectiveness with health and education policy that leads to measurable results.

== Books ==
- David, Age 14: Who and what determine our children’s health, education, and future (and Dominic Cappello) ISBN 979-8368365206
- Attack of the Three-Headed Hydras (and Dominic Cappello) ISBN 979-8681836940
- 100% Community: Ensuring 10 Vital Services for Surviving and Thriving (and Dominic Cappello) ISBN 979-8637165933
- Anna, Age Eight: The data-driven prevention of childhood trauma and maltreatment (and Dominic Cappello) ISBN 1-9799-0307-7
