= Pepper Schwartz =

American sociologist and sexologist

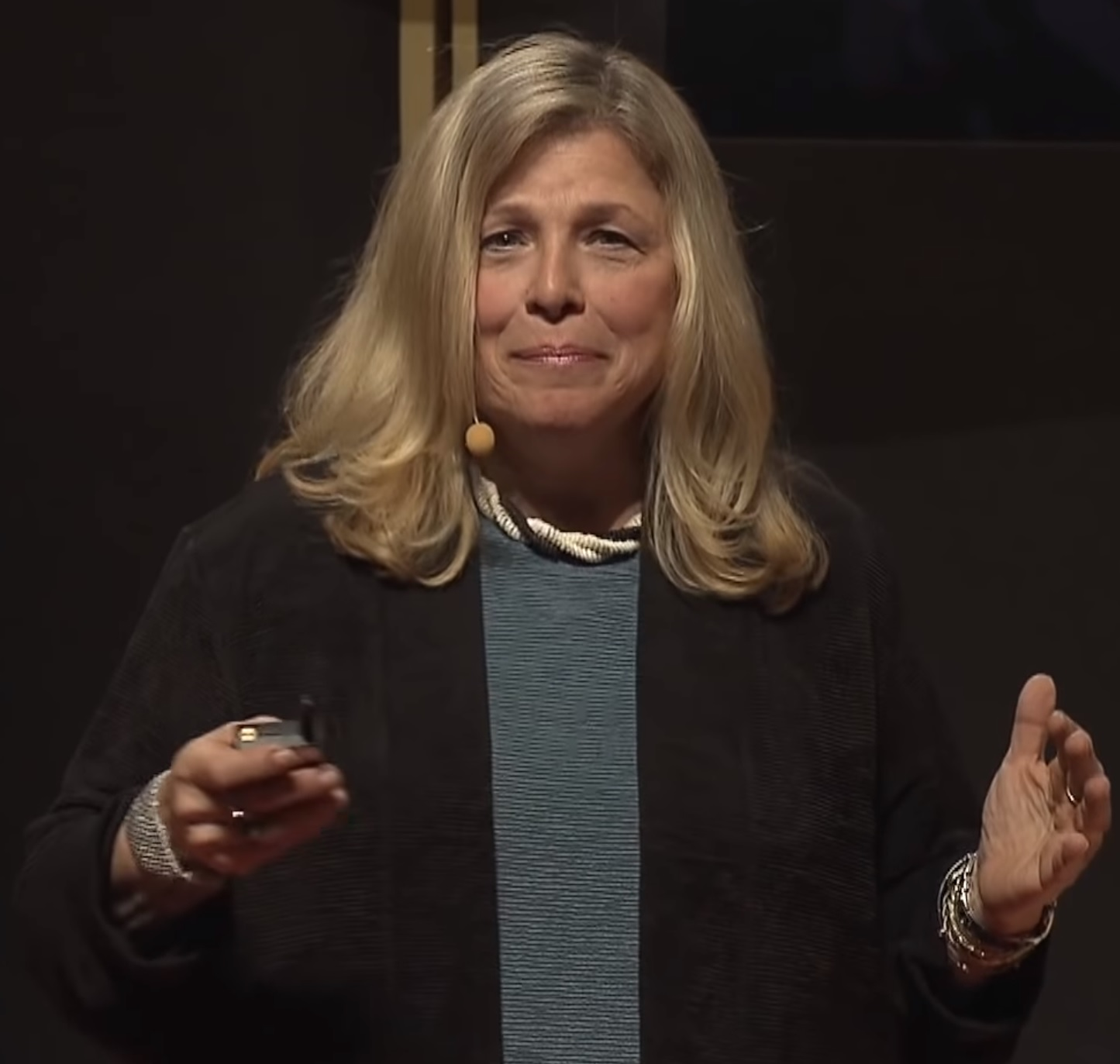
- Schwartz speaks at TEDx Rainier on "The Next Sexual Revolution" in 2011.
- Born: 11 May 1945 (age 81); Chicago, Illinois, United States
- Education: Washington University in St. Louis; Yale University
- Occupation: Sociologist
- Known for: Lesbian bed death

Pepper Schwartz (born May 11, 1945) is an American sexologist and sociologist teaching at the University of Washington in Seattle, Washington, United States. She is the author or co-author of numerous books, magazines, and website columns, and is a television personality on the subject of sexuality.

Schwartz is notable for her work in the 1970s and early 1980s that culminated in the book American Couples: Money-Work-Sex, which was co-written with Philip Blumstein and surveyed lesbian couples, gay male couples and heterosexual couples.

Schwartz also serves as the Love & Relationship Expert & Ambassador for AARP and writes the column The Naked Truth.

== Biography ==
Schwartz was born in Chicago, Illinois, into a Jewish home, the daughter of Gertrude and her husband, Julius J. Schwartz, an attorney.

She received a BA and an MA from the coeducational Washington University in St. Louis and came to Yale University as a graduate student in sociology in 1968, the year before Yale admitted female undergraduates, receiving an MA and PhD in sociology in 1974. While a graduate student there, she co-authored with Janet Lever the 1971 book Women at Yale, documenting the first year of co-education at that university.

Schwartz wrote the column "Sex and Health" for Glamour magazine for seven years. She has appeared on The Oprah Winfrey Show, Dateline, and Dr. Phil, as well as on programs for the cable television network Lifetime; she currently airs as one of the relationship “experts” on the reality television show Married at First Sight. She was the 2005 president of the Pacific Sociological Association, helped create the dating website Perfectmatch.com, and is a sexuality adviser for WebMD.

Schwartz is a past president and fellow of the Society for the Scientific Study of Sexuality and a charter member of the International Academy of Sex Research. The book jacket for her 2007 publication Prime: Adventures and Advice on Sex, Love, and the Sensual Years described her living "in Washington State, being single after a 23 year marriage, and having two children in college".

Research by Schwartz and others surveying lesbian sexuality has generated debates because the surveys stated that lesbian couples in long-term relationships have less sex than their heterosexual or gay male counterparts. The phenomenon was labeled "lesbian bed death". One factor in this debate concerns how "sex" acts were defined in surveys.

== Works ==
- Sex and the Yale Student, with Richard Feller, Elaine Fox, and Dr. Philip Sarrel (The Committee on Human Sexuality, Yale University, 1970)
- The Student Guide to Sex on Campus, by the Student Committee on Human Sexuality at Yale, edited by Richard Feller, Elaine Fox, and Pepper Schwartz (Signet Books, 1971)
- Women at Yale: Liberating a College Campus, with Janet Lever (Bobbs-Merrill Company, 1971)
- American Couples, with Philip Blumstein (William Morrow, 1983)
  - American Couples: Money-Work-Sex, with Philip Blumstein (Pocket Books, 1985) ISBN 0-671-52353-8, ISBN 978-0-671-52353-4
- Gender in Intimate Relationships: A Micro-Structural Approach, with Barbara J. Risman (Wadsworth Publishing Company, 1988) ISBN 0-534-09690-5, ISBN 978-0-534-09690-8
- Everything You Know About Love and Sex Is Wrong (Perigee Trade, 1991 reissue) ISBN 0-399-52712-5, ISBN 978-0-399-52712-8
- Peer Marriage (The Free Press, 1994) ISBN 0-7432-5407-4
- Love Between Equals: How Peer Marriage Really Works (Touchstone, 1995) ISBN 0-02-874061-0, ISBN 978-0-02-874061-4
- The Gender of Sexuality: Exploring Sexual Possibilities (The Gender Lens series), with Virginia Rutter (AltaMira Press, 1998) ISBN 0-8039-9042-1, ISBN 978-0-8039-9042-5
- The Great Sex Weekend: A 48-hour Guide to Rekindling Sparks for Bold, Busy, or Bored Lovers, with Janet Lever (Perigee Trade, 2000) ISBN 0-399-52571-8, ISBN 978-0-399-52571-1
- Ten Talks Parents Must Have with their Children About Sex and Character, with Dominic Cappello (Hyperion Books, 2000) ISBN 0-7868-8548-3, ISBN 978-0-7868-8548-0
- 201 Questions to Ask Your Kids: 201 Questions to Ask Your Parents (Collins, 2000) ISBN 0-380-80525-1, ISBN 978-0-380-80525-9
- The Lifetime Love and Sex Quiz Book (Hyperion Books, 2002) ISBN 0-7868-8748-6, ISBN 978-0-7868-8748-4
- Schwartz, Pepper (2006). Finding your perfect match. Perigee Trade. ISBN 978-0-399-53244-3.
- Prime: Advice and Adventures on Sex, Love and the Sensuous Years (Collins, 2007) ISBN 0-06-117358-4. ISBN 978-0-06-117358-5
- The Normal Bar: The Surprising Secrets of Happy Couples, with Chrisanna Northrup and James Witte (Harmony, 2012) ISBN 978-0-307-95163-2
- Dating After 50 for Dummies (John Wiley and sons, 2014) ISBN 978-1-118-44132-9
- Snap Strategies for Couples: 45 fast fixes for everyday relationship pitfalls, with Lana Staheli ( Seal Press, 2015ISBN 9781-58005-562-8
- 50 Great Myths of Human Sexuality with Martha Kempner (Wiley Blackwell, 2015) ISBN 978-0-470-67433-8
- Frommers Places for Passion: the 75 most romantic destinations in the world-and why every couple needs to get away, with Janet Lever ( AARP Media, 2015) ISBN 978-1-62887-150-0
