= Seven Year Itch =

Seven Year Itch may refer to:

== Arts and entertainment ==
=== Theatre, film and television ===
- The Seven Year Itch (play), by George Axelrod, 1952
- The Seven Year Itch, a 1955 film based on the play
- Seven Years Itch, a film by Johnnie To, 1987
- "The Seven Year Itch" (Grimm), a 2017 TV episode

=== Music ===
- Seven Year Itch: 1982–1989, a 1999 compilation album by Platinum Blonde
- Seven Year Itch: Greatest Hits, 1994–2001, a 2001 compilation album by Collective Soul
- The Seven Year Itch (Angelica album), 2002
- The Seven Year Itch (Siouxsie and the Banshees album), 2003
- Seven Year Itch (Etta James album), 1988

== Other uses ==
- Seven-year itch (idiom), a term that suggests that happiness declines after around year seven of a marriage
- Scabies, or seven-year itch, a parasitic skin infection

== See also ==
- 7 Year Bitch, an American music group
- 7 Year Bitch (song), a song by English rock band Slade
