= Women who have sex with women =

Sexual identity-neutral term

Women who have sex with women (WSW) are women who engage in sexual activities with other women, whether they identify as straight, lesbian, bisexual, pansexual, have other sexualities, or dispense with sexual identification altogether. The term WSW is often used in medical literature to describe such women as a group for clinical study, without needing to consider sexual self-identity.

== Physical health ==
=== General ===
In terms of medical issues with regard to sexual practices between women, the sexual identification of women who consult a medical professional is usually not sought nor volunteered, due to misconceptions and assumptions about sexuality and the hesitancy of some women in disclosing their accurate sexual histories even to a physician. Medical research on women's health often lacks differentiation between WSW and strictly-heterosexual women, which skews results towards the majority group.

Accessing birth control is the initiating factor for most women to seek consultation with a gynecologist. Thus, women who do not participate in penile-vaginal intercourse may not see a physician upon becoming sexually active. As a result, these women are not screened regularly with pap smears because they have a lower perceived risk of acquiring a sexually transmitted infection or types of cancer. Lesbians are less likely than their heterosexual and bisexual counterparts to get screened for cervical cancer, with some being refused screenings by medical professionals.

The lower rate of lesbians tested by regular pap smears makes it more difficult to detect cervical cancer at early stages in lesbians. The risk factors for developing ovarian cancer rates are higher in lesbians than in heterosexual women, perhaps because lesbians are more likely to lack protective factors such contraceptive use, pregnancy, abortion, breastfeeding, and miscarriages.

Another factor which leads to lesbians neglecting to seek medical screening in the United States is a lack of health insurance offered by employers for same-sex domestic partners. When women do seek medical attention, medical professionals often fail to take a complete medical history. In a recent study of 2,345 lesbian and bisexual women, only 9.3% had claimed they had ever been asked their sexual orientation by a physician. A third of the respondents believed disclosing their sexual history would result in a negative reaction, and 30% had received a negative reaction from a medical professional after identifying themselves as lesbian or bisexual.

A patient's complete history helps medical professionals identify higher risk areas and corrects assumptions about the personal histories of women. In a 2006 survey of 6,935 lesbians, 77% had had sexual contact with one or more male partners, and 6% had that contact within the previous year. (Note: Another summary of overall surveys found that women who identify as lesbian, 80-95% had previous sexual contact with men, and some report sexual behavior that is risky (King, p. 221).)

=== Sexually transmitted infections ===
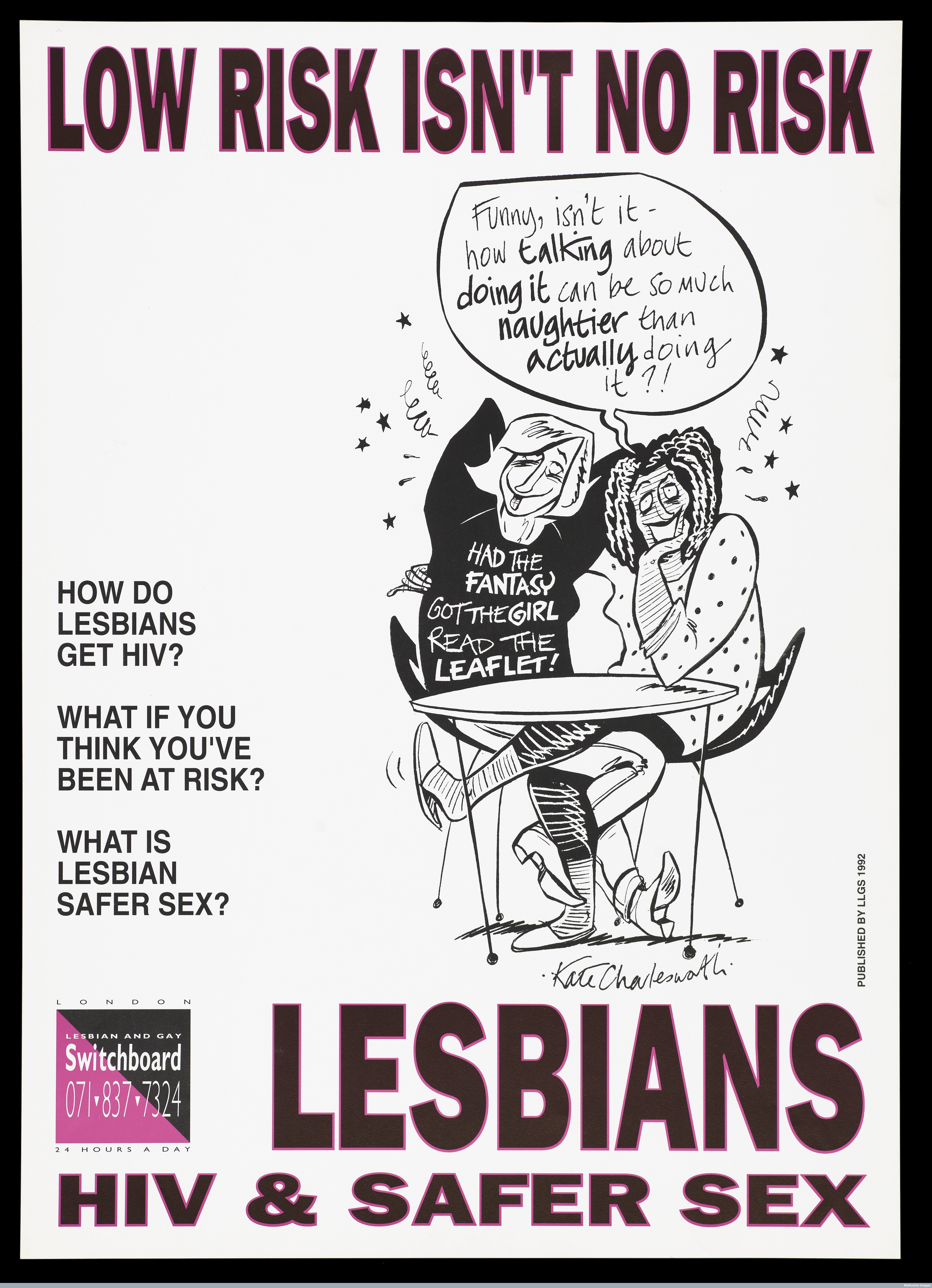
The poster about safer sex between women

Some STIs are communicable between women, including human papillomavirus (HPV), trichomoniasis, syphilis, human immunodeficiency virus (HIV), bacterial vaginosis (BV), and herpes simplex virus (HSV). Transmission of specific sexually transmitted infections among women who have sex with women depends on the sexual practices women engage in. Any object that comes in contact with cervical secretions, vaginal mucosa, or menstrual blood, including fingers or penetrative objects may transmit sexually transmitted infections. Oral-genital contact may indicate a higher risk of acquiring HSV, even among women who have had no prior sex with men. HSV-2 infection in particular occurs in nearly 1 in 10 of lesbians. Bacterial vaginosis occurs more often in lesbians, but it is unclear if BV is transmitted by sexual contact; it occurs in celibate as well as sexually active women. BV often occurs in both partners in a lesbian relationship; a recent study of women with BV found that 81% had partners with BV. Lesbians are not included in a category of frequency of HIV transmission, although transmission is possible through vaginal and cervical fluids and secretions; the highest rate of transmission of HIV from women to women is among those who have sexual intercourse with men, or participate in intravenous drug use.

Many doctors consider sex between women to have negligible risk for transmission of STIs and fail to offer any information on prevention of STI transmission for sex involving two women. Although lesbians have a lower risk of contracting STIs than their heterosexual and bisexual counterparts, the risk still exists. Additionally, most WSW have had sex with men at some point in their lifetime, which significantly increases the risk of infection. Yearly pelvic exams are encouraged for WSW to contain the complications of STIs.

=== Safe sex ===
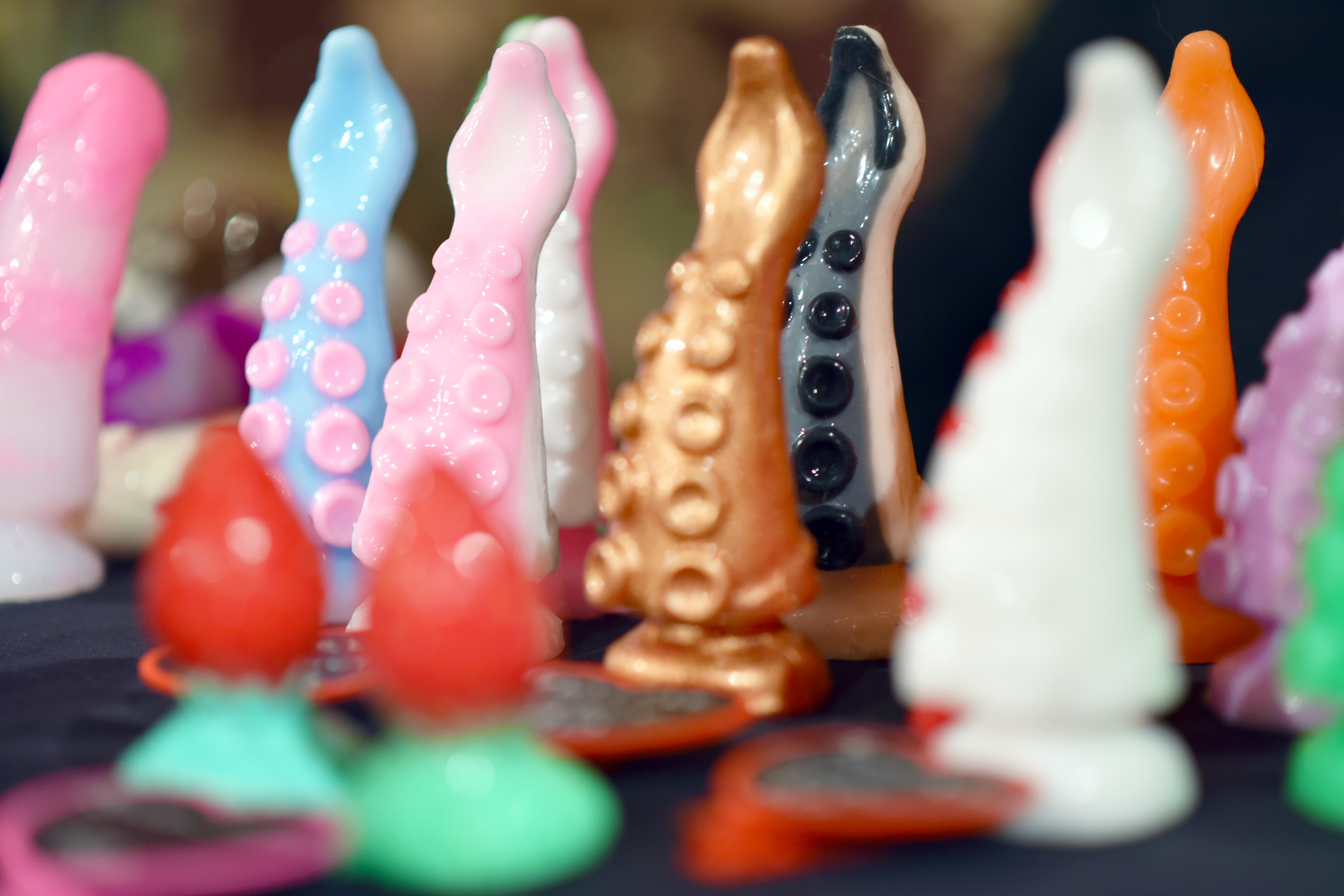
Sex toys made of non-porous materials like silicone can be cleaned to prevent STI transmission

There are various ways for WSW to protect against the contraction of STIs during sex, though these methods are not well studied. Dental dams, condoms on sex toys, gloves, and cling wraps are all used as protection during various forms of sex. Most WSW do not use protection during sex, due to misconceptions that a lower risk of STI transmission means that barriers are not needed. Engaging in oral sex without the use of a dental dam or condom is considered a high risk sexual behavior.

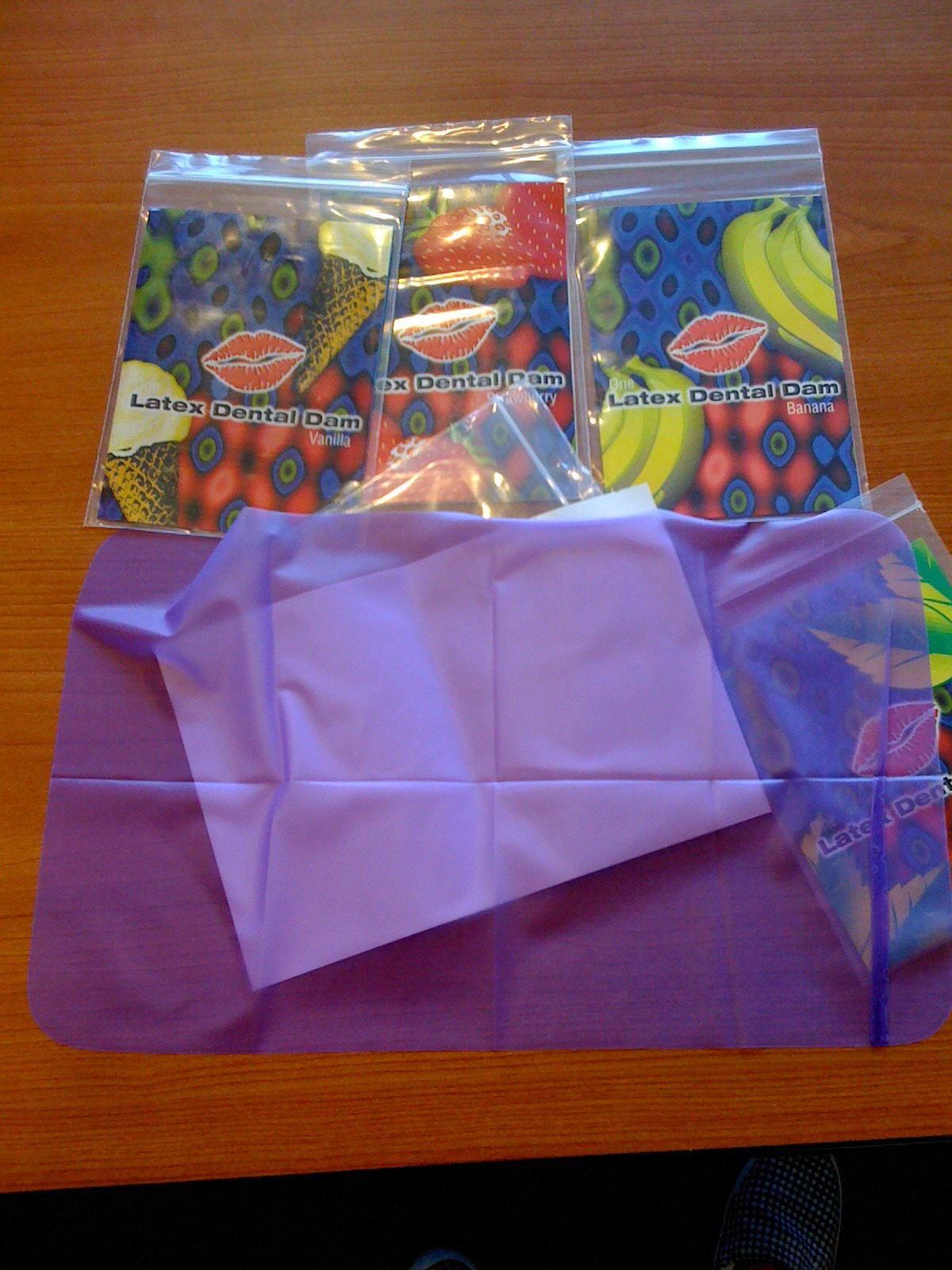
A translucent purple latex dental dam

The CDC recommends using a dental dam during oral sex. Additionally, HIV prevention organizations distribute dental dams along with condoms and other safe sex supplies. The FDA has not evaluated dental dams or other barriers for their effectiveness in preventing the spread STIs. Health educators widely encourage their use during cunnilingus or anilingus, but dental dams are not widely used by WSW. Dental dams were originally medical equipment but now some sexual-health focused products exist. Dental dams are commonly found at STI clinics and on the Internet but may be difficult to find at drugstores where condoms are normally sold. Dental dams may also be made by cutting open a latex condom. Latex condoms are known to be impermeable to pathogens which can cause STIs.

Similarly to condoms, a new dental dam is used for each instance of oral sex to reduce the risk of STI transmission. Dams are placed over the vaginal or anal opening before the start of any sexual activities and not be removed until activities are concluded. To ensure no tears or rips occur, water or silicone based lubricant can be used. Additionally, dams are not stretched out as this could lead to tears. Dental dams are stored in a cool and dry location, and never be used after their printed expiration date.

While condoms may not be applicable to many WSW sexual encounters, they are still useful when sex toys are involved. Toys that are shared between partners can spread pathogens even when cleaned. The use of condoms in addition to thorough cleaning can help reduce the risk of transmission via sex toys.

In the event of any open sores or wounds on the hands, latex gloves can be used to prevent infection while fingering or fisting. Gloves are placed over the hand before sexual activity ensues and kept on through the duration of the activity.

Cling wrap is often posed as an alternative to dental dams, but not widely recommended. Cling wrap is used in the same way as dental dams. No studies currently exist on the permeability of cling wrap to STI causing pathogens, but it is known to be waterproof.

== Mental health ==
Since medical literature began to describe homosexuality, it has often been approached from a view that sought to find an inherent psychopathology as the root cause. Much literature on mental health and lesbians centered on their depression, substance use disorders, and suicide. Although these issues exist among lesbians, discussion about their causes shifted after homosexuality was removed from the Diagnostic and Statistical Manual in 1973. Instead, social ostracism, legal discrimination, internalization of negative stereotypes, and limited support structures indicate factors homosexuals face in Western societies that often adversely affect their mental health. Women who identify as lesbian report feeling significantly different and isolated during adolescence; these emotions have been cited as appearing on average at 15 years old in lesbians and 18 years old in women who identify as bisexual.

Anxiety disorders and depression are the most common mental health issues for women. Depression is reported among lesbians at a rate similar to heterosexual women. It is a more significant problem among women who feel they must hide their sexual orientation from friends and family, experience compounded ethnic or religious discrimination, or experience relationship difficulties with no support system. More than half the respondents to a 1994 survey of health issues in lesbians reported they had suicidal thoughts, and 18% had attempted suicide.

A population-based study completed by the National Alcohol Research Center found that women who identify as lesbian or bisexual are less likely to abstain from alcohol. Lesbians and bisexual women have a higher likelihood of reporting problems with alcohol, as well as not being satisfied with treatment for substance use programs. Many lesbian communities are centered in bars, and drinking is an activity that correlates to community participation for lesbians and bisexual women.

== Intimate partner violence ==
WSW are more likely than heterosexual women to have experienced intimate partner violence of any form from their female partner. Differences between bisexual women and lesbian women varied by cohabitation and abuse type. Bisexual women are more likely to perpetrait queer-specific abuse than lesbian women whereas lesbian women are more likely to perpetrait psychological agression against their female partners. Bisexual women are twice as likely as heterosexual women to experience stalking or intimate partner rape.

== Omission from research studies ==
It can be difficult to draw robust and wide reaching conclusions about WSW, since many studies fail to specifically include this group. Little scholarly research is done on WSW relative to other sexual minority groups. Research on sexual health is generally about pregnancy and heterosexual sex, with the needs of WSW largely ignored. Studies on intimate partner violence often fail to report the sex of the perpetrator or the sexual orientation of the victim, making it difficult to study the prevalence in WSW communities.

== See also ==
- Biology and sexual orientation
- Ego-dystonic sexual orientation
- Gender and sexual diversity
- Men who have sex with men
- Rape of females by females
- Same gender loving
- Same-sex relationship
- Sapphism
- Terminology of homosexuality
- Victimization of bisexual women
