= Dental dam =

Thin sheet used in dentistry to isolate the operative site

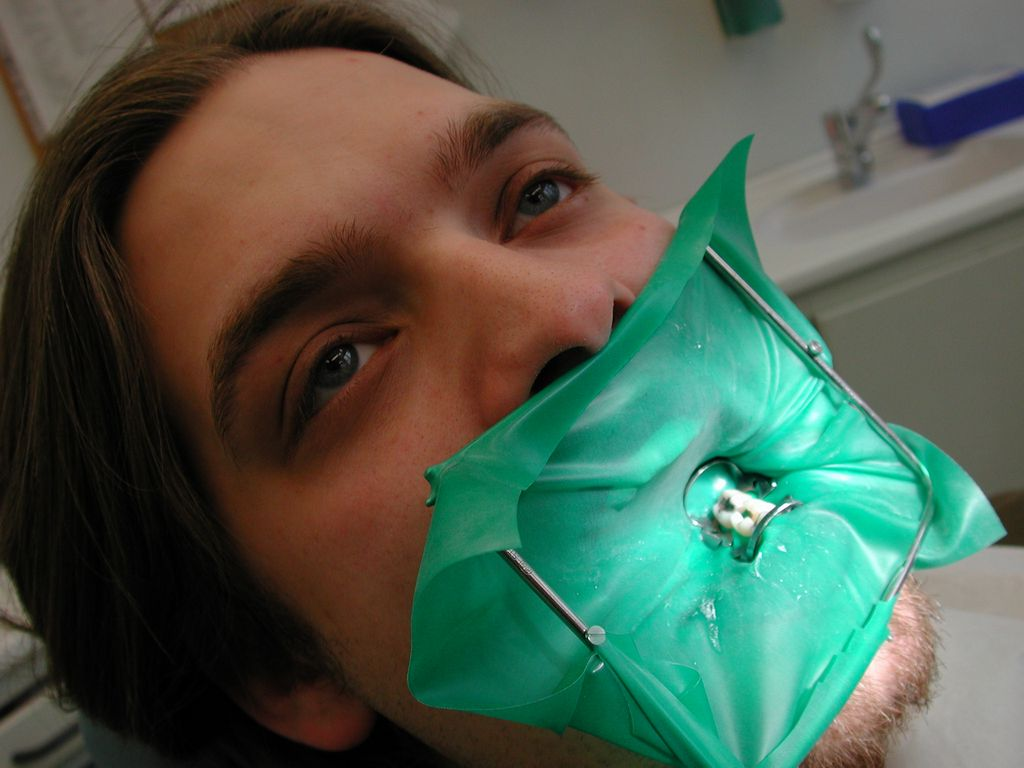
- A dental dam applied to isolate a tooth during a procedure.
- Other names: Rubber dam; Kofferdam
- Specialty: Dentistry, endodontics
- MeSH: D012391

A dental dam or rubber dam is a thin, 6-inch (150 mm) square sheet, usually latex or nitrile, used in dentistry to isolate the operative site (one or more teeth) from the rest of the mouth. Sometimes termed "Kofferdam" (from German), it was designed in the United States in 1864 by Sanford Christie Barnum. Dental dams are used mainly in endodontic, fixed prosthodontic (crowns, bridges) and general restorative treatments. Their purpose is both to prevent saliva interfering with the dental work (e.g. contamination of oral micro-organisms during root canal therapy, or to keep filling materials such as composite dry during placement and curing), and to prevent instruments and materials from being inhaled, swallowed or damaging the mouth. In dentistry, use of a rubber dam is sometimes referred to as isolation or moisture control.

Dental dams are also used for safer oral sex.

== Dentistry ==
=== Background ===
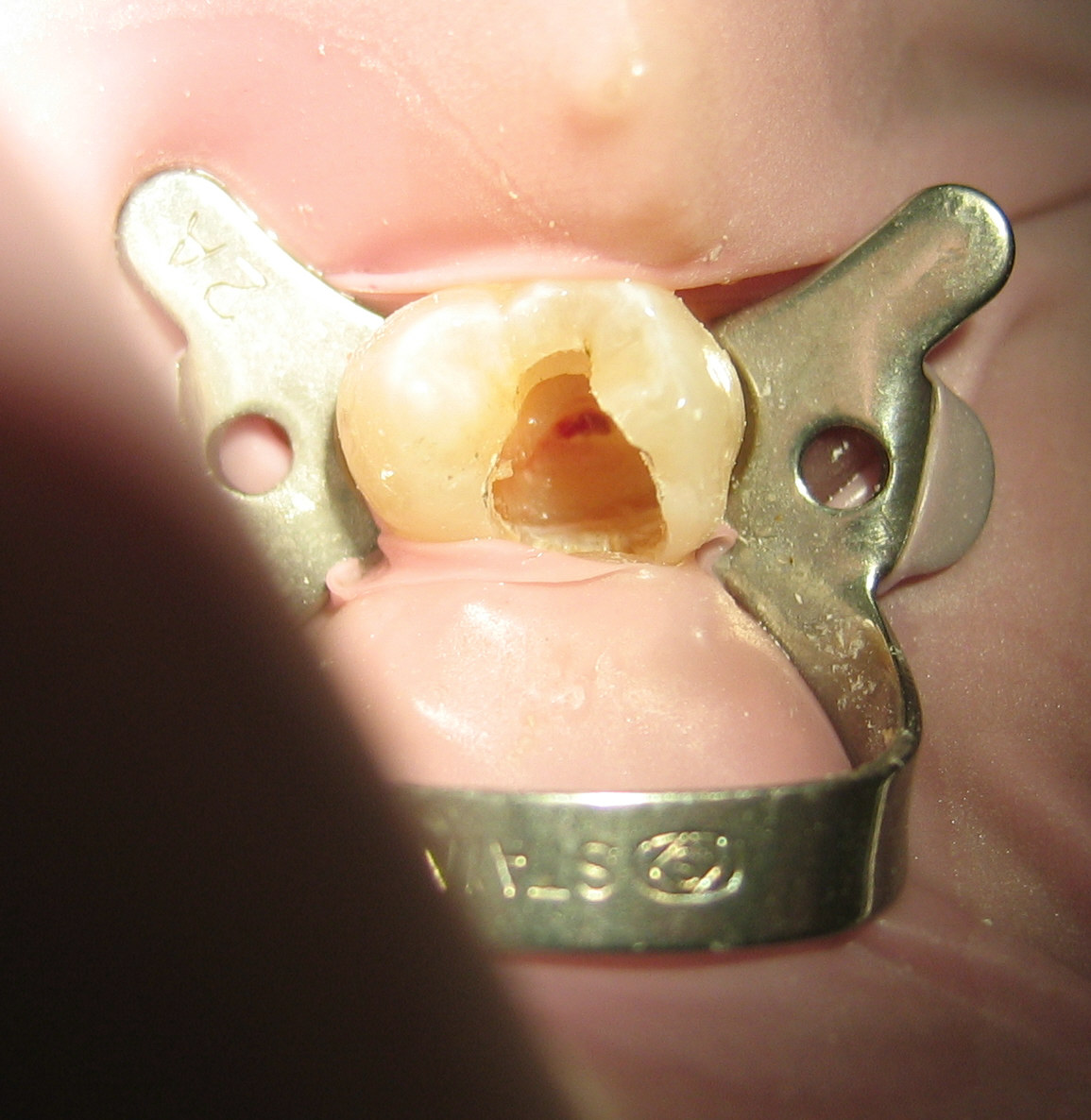
Rubber dam isolation of upper left second premolar, held in place with a rubber dam clamp during endodontic therapy

The technique used to apply the dental dam is selected according to the tooth requiring treatment. Several techniques can be used including single tooth isolation, multiple tooth isolation or split dam technique. The dental dam is prepared by punching one or more holes in the dental dam sheet to enable isolation of the appropriate number of teeth required for the dental procedure. The dental dam is then applied to the tooth, anchored into place using a metal or flexible plastic clamp (chosen according to the tooth and area it will be applied to). The clamp will ideally fit snugly around the tooth along the margin of the gingiva, stabilising the dental dam and preventing contamination of the working area due to saliva ingress. Individuals may experience subjective discomfort due to the tight sensation of the dam clamp, therefore topical anaesthetic (liquid or gel) may be applied to the gingiva at the operator's discretion prior to applying the dental dam.

=== History ===
Prior to the use of the rubber dam isolation method, many dental procedures had a high risk of contamination from saliva and bacteria infiltrating the tooth during a procedure. This can lead to the failure of the treatment being undertaken which can result in further interventions or the loss of a tooth. Dr Sanford C. Barnum was the original designer of the dental dam as a way to keep the operation site clear from saliva. It was in 1882 that Dr S. S. White improved the design further by adjusting the hole punched into the sheet. In spite of these changes, it was found to be difficult to stabilise the dam around the tooth until Dr. Delous Palmer developed the metal clamps which anchors the dam around the selected tooth. These clamps are available in various shapes and sizes which are designed to fit different tooth structures and morphology.

=== Applications ===
There are several treatments where dental dam can be applied; dental restorations, endodontic treatments including root canal therapy, fissure sealants, preparation of dental crown, dental implant and some veneer placements.

There is an ongoing controversy with the use and efficacy of rubber dam among dental practitioners. Some practitioners may routinely employ its use, for others it may only be applied during selective treatments whereas many others will avoid its application altogether. Although the use of rubber dam is considered a standard of care, studies showed that a large number of dental practitioners do not utilise it during procedures. The standard is defined by reasonable standard supported by evidence.

=== Armamentarium ===
The set up of a rubber dam has many elements and involves the use of specific tools and accessories which usually consist of:

- Rubber dam sheets
- Clamps or hooks
- Frame
- Forceps
- Dam Punch
- Dental floss

Other materials that may be used to assist with the setting up of rubber dam are:

- OralSeal
- Wooden wedges
- Wedjets

=== Rubber dam application ===
The dental dam sheets are predominantly made from synthetic rubbers such as latex or nitrile and tend to be 15 cm by 15 cm in length and width. The thickness of each dam sheet is approximately between 0.14 mm and 0.38 mm but the size, shape, colour and material that the dam sheet is made from can vary with differing manufacturers. Most manufacturers will make dental dam sheet alternatives that are suitable for patients with allergies to materials such as latex and some may even make alternatives that can be autoclaved.

The dental dam is anchored around the crown of the tooth using a metal clamp to seal and secure the rubber dam sheet to the tooth or teeth that are receiving treatment during the dental procedure. The clamps come in a variety of shapes and sizes which suit the anatomy of the different teeth in the mouth. Before placing the dam in the mouth dental professionals may choose to secure dental floss around the clamps; this acts as an anchor to prevent aspiration or swallowing. It can also provide a point of reference for the clinician to be able to visualise and retrieve the clamp if it dislodges from the tooth or the dam forceps.

The purpose of the rubber dam frame is to keep the dam sheet taut around target areas; this will ensure that a clinician can work effectively on the tooth without the dam sheet obstructing vision and becoming entangled in dental instruments during the procedure. There are several types of dental dam frames which have an array of purposes. The frames are made from stainless steel, polypropylene or other polymer plastics. Irrespective of the material the dam frame is made from, the frame will always have small pins on the outer edges which act to secure the dam sheet to the frame. The plastic dam frames are predominantly used in the case where dental radiography is planned as they are less radiodense, ensuring the frame appears radiolucent to avoid superimposition of the frame in the radiograph.

The dam punch is a tool used to perforate holes of various sizes into the dental dam sheet. When punching holes in the rubber dam prior to a procedure the size and spacing of the teeth to be isolated should be taken into consideration. In multi-tooth isolation, the holes should correspond to the curve of the dental arch. The rubber dam armamentarium can be set up in a variety of ways; this usually depends on clinician preference and education.

In difficult clinical cases, the standard dental clamp needs to be adapted. One efficient method is using the carved gypsum cast as described by NCE Cazacu.

=== Advantages ===
Using a rubber dam for dental procedures can provide multiple advantages. A rubber dam can provide a clean and dry operating field away from substances such as saliva and blood. This is important for dental procedures as the bonding ability of adhesives and cements is heightened in a clean and dry field away from possible contamination, in order for maximum adhesive strength between the restorative materials, dentin and enamel. If the environment is contaminated leading to poor bonding of the materials, the success and longevity of the restoration is shortened.

When using the rubber dam, it is possible to isolate one or more teeth. By doing this, the clinicians visibility of the tooth is greatly improved, due to the increase in contrast with the rubber dam around the tooth or teeth, whilst at the same time it retracts the soft tissues such as the lips, tongue, and cheeks, and reduces mirror fogging:allowing the clinician to focus solely on the restorative site, which can lead to the procedure also being more time-efficient. Even though it is commonly said that the rubber dam takes too much time to apply, in many ways it can reduce the time needed for the procedure, as not only does it isolate the tooth, it reduces the ability for the patient to communicate with the clinician. This is most beneficial for the over talkative patients which can sometimes hinder the efficiency of treatment and can instead allow more time for the clinician to focus on the task at hand in order for the procedure to take less time.

A Cochrane review in 2021 suggests that the use of rubber dam as an isolation method provides a chance for dental restorations to last longer. Disregarding the fact that it is low-quality evidence, there is still proof that over a two-year period, comparing restorations done using rubber dams versus cotton roll isolation, the rubber dam group had a lower risk of failure with a risk ratio of 0.80 compared to cotton roll isolation at 1.19, however, further research is needed on varying restorative treatments.

Additionally, a rubber dam can act as an infection control barrier and reduce the risk of cross-contamination and infection. In case the patient may have a contagious disease the rubber dam decreases the chance of the splatter of microbial content if the patient were to cough or the spread of microbes being caused by the pressure from the triplex, which is a tube or syringe used to deliver air or water under pressure.

A rubber dam can also protect patients' airways. It does not eliminate the chance, but decreases the possibility of the patient accidentally swallowing or inhaling restorative instruments, tooth fragments or debris. [10] That has happened in the past, and should this occur, the patient must always be admitted into hospital as a chest X-ray is necessary in order to discover where the inhalant may be and whether it may potentially need to be removed on the operating table or not. As it has potential to be life-threatening if ignored.

Not only instruments or debris, but also chemical materials used in dental procedures (such as acid etch, seals, and amalgam) can have harmful effects. In endodontic procedures, corrosive irrigants are contained such as sodium hypochlorite (bleach). Without the protection of a rubber dam, there is an increased risk of this chemical damaging the soft tissues of the mouth and being more harmful if swallowed. Another example is during amalgam restorations, as amalgam contains the element mercury, and if ingested during the placing of amalgam can cause potentially harmful side effects if not treated. However, after amalgam is placed safely, evidence does suggest the exposure to mercury is at a level which is non-harmful and safe for the human body.

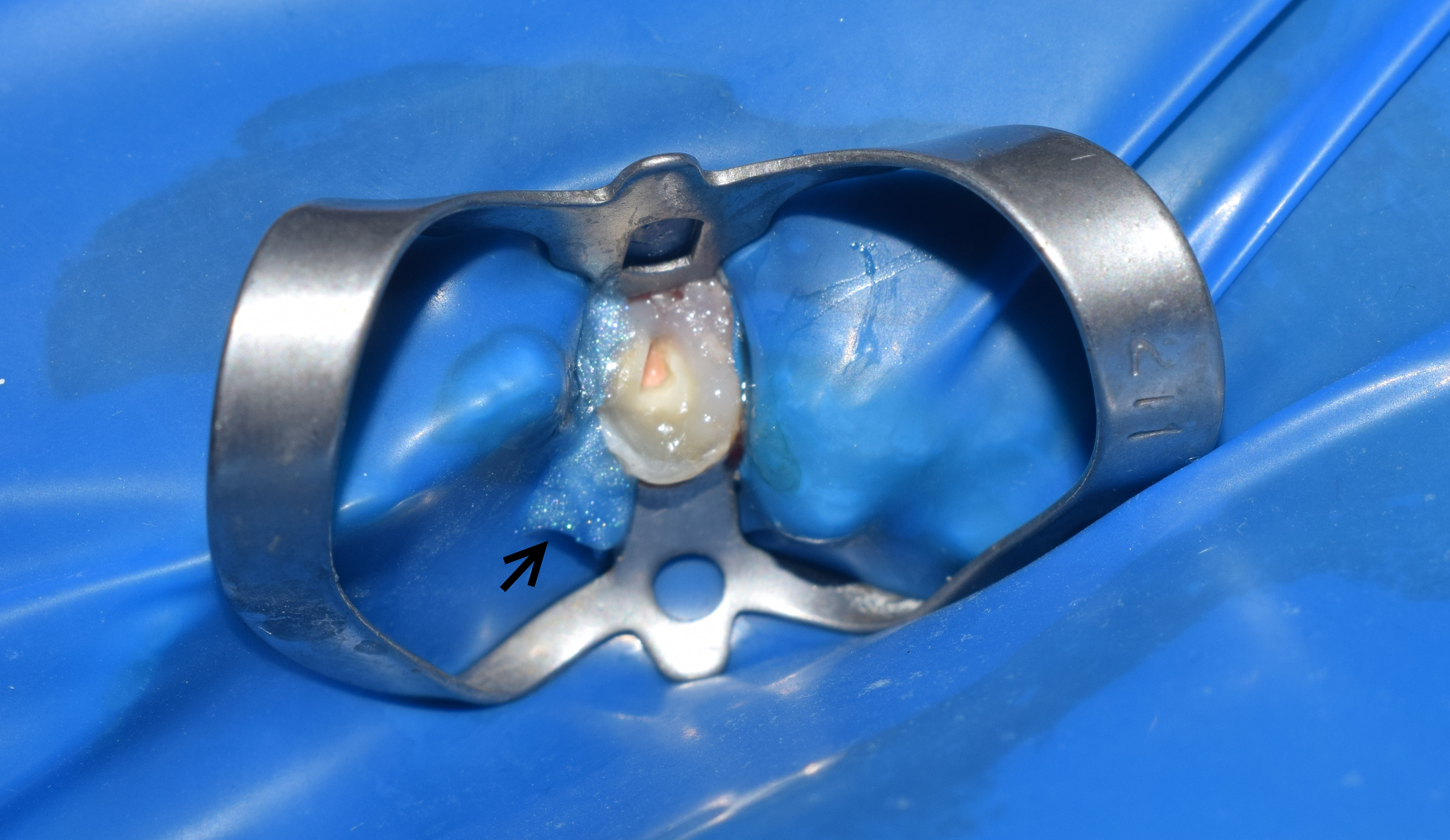
Sealing agent used on a patient to fill in some gaps between the rubber dam and gingiva, after a tear was caused in the rubber dam

The rubber dam can also offer additional protection of the soft tissues of oral mucosa from sharp instruments, acting as a barrier between the instrument and the soft tissue. Additionally, associated with rubber dam is a caulking adhesive, caulking in definition is a material used to seal joints, in this can be used to fill in gaps between the rubber dam and gingiva as it adheres to the wet rubber dam or mucosal tissues, acting as another mode of protection.

A big issue surrounding the rubber dam is its use as part of a legal obligation. In some parts of the world, the use of a rubber dam is obligatory for procedures such as endodontic treatment. The reason for this is that if an injury was to occur or possible cross-contamination and the result could have been prevented by rubber dam, this situation is regarded as medico-legally indefensible, meaning the clinician will not be able to defend themselves in court due to the duty of care falling under negligence of the patient.

Lastly, some patients, in fact, prefer using the rubber dam, as having been told and understanding the risks instead feel more comfortable knowing they are safer with it than without it, as well as feeling dissociated from the noises happening around them such as the drilling. Additionally, some patients tend to be more comfortable as they may prefer the feeling of not having water and suction running within their mouths.

=== Disadvantages ===
Although there are many advantages of rubber dams during dental treatment there are also associated risks and disadvantages. The rubber dam can take extra time to apply; however, with consistent practice and use by the dental practitioner, this may not have an effect on the length of the appointment. Insufficient training and the inconvenience of application can also be a deterrent for its use and can also contribute to lost time. The cost of dental dams is an expense to the dental practice and could also be a disincentive. Although the rubber dams are inexpensive to purchase, initial costs for the armamentarium can be high.

There is a risk of rubber dam clamps breaking during application due to the chemical effects of sodium hypochlorite, an antimicrobial solution used during root canal treatments, repeated stresses of clinical use, or autoclaving, all of which can potentially weaken the material. To avoid swallowing or aspiration of broken clamps, the dental practitioner should place floss around the clamp to allow its retrieval if it snaps or springs off during a procedure.

As the dental dam clamp is placed along the gum line, this can cause some discomfort or pain (especially in a patient who does not require local anaesthesia), bleeding from the gums, damage to the periodontal ligament or abrasion of the cementum on the root of the tooth, which may cause an uneven surface on the tooth root that can retain plaque.

The dental dam is placed over the mouth, effectively blocking off the airway, which means the patient must be able to comfortably breathe through their nose. This is a problem for patients with nasal airway obstruction such as the common cold, a broken nose, adenoids, recurring sinus issues, or those who habitually breathe through their mouths. Patients can also find that communication is reduced between the dental practitioner and themselves, which may result in feelings of claustrophobia, vulnerability, and anxiety. Those prone to dental phobia and individuals who have learning difficulties, disabilities or special needs may find the use of dental dams impossible and intolerable.

To an extent, the use of a dental dam may lead to visual distortion of tooth morphology since the other teeth and the rest of the mouth are hidden from view. This may lead to perforation if an access cavity is incorrectly angled during root canal therapy. For this reason, endodontists may routinely begin their access cavity before applying the dam. This will ensure the correct orientation prior to commencing removal of the blood vessels, nerve tissue and other cellular entities from the tooth.

The rubber dam, which is usually brightly coloured (blue or green), may alter the apparent colour of the tooth, which can lead to incorrect choice of shade, e.g. during placement of a dental composite during a restorative procedure. For this reason, dental practitioners should select the appropriate shade of material prior to the application of rubber dam.

As the rubber dams are primarily made of latex, patients may experience reactions which range from uncomfortable (allergic contact dermatitis, allergic contact cheilitis, allergic contact stomatitis) to life-threatening (anaphylaxis). Nitrile versions are available for those with latex allergies and adverse reactions can be avoided by patients informing dental practitioners of latex allergies prior to treatment or adverse reactions after rubber dam application.

== Oral sex ==
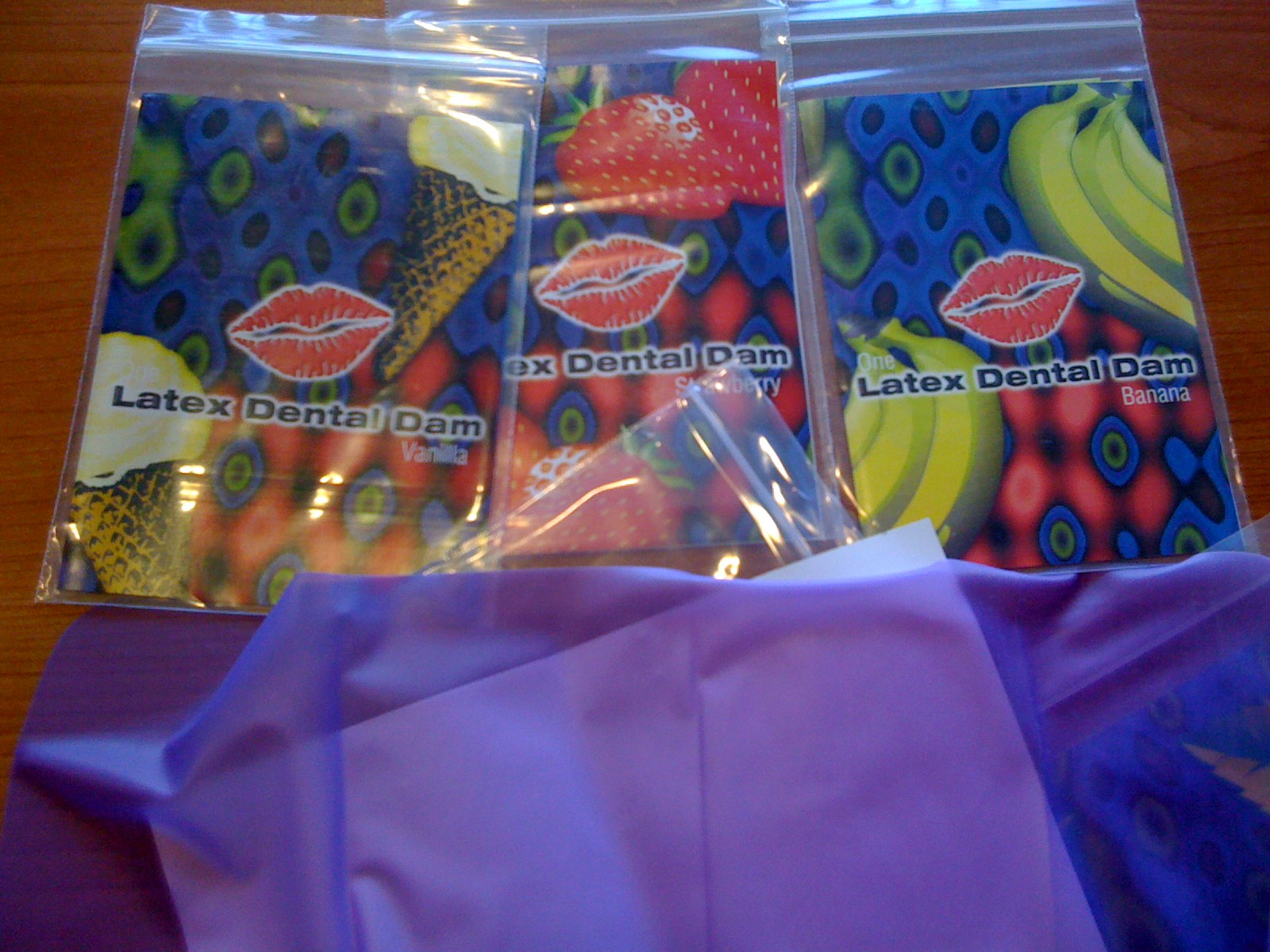
Flavoured dams packaged for sale as a safer sex product

Dental dams are sometimes suggested for use as a physical barrier against the exchange of body fluids during cunnilingus and anilingus, especially for women who have sex with women to protect against sexually transmitted infections (STIs). However, they are rarely used for this purpose, and as of 2012, there is no evidence that their use reduces the risk of STI transmission, including the risk of HIV infection.

After lubrication with a water-based lubricant, an unpunctured dental dam may be held over the vulva or anus, allowing oral stimulation of these areas without transmission of bodily fluids or direct physical contact. Plastic cling wrap, condoms (repurposed by cutting off the tip and ring and cutting them lengthwise) or latex gloves (cut open longitudinally) can be used for STI protection in a similar manner as a dental dam, by providing a physical barrier to cover the vulvar or anal areas during oral sex and these alternative barrier methods are more affordable and readily available than dental dams. Dental dams were initially promoted in the 1980s in some safer sex campaigns as a barrier to prevent transmission of STIs during oral sex. They were introduced for use in some women's prisons in Canada and Australia (in the jurisdictions of New South Wales, the Australian Capital Territory, Western Australia, and South Australia) in the 1990s as a form of sexual barrier protection after the World Health Organization (WHO) recommended that female prisoners should have access to dental dams. Inmates have reported numerous problems with dental dam use, including the dam being too thick, lack of availability, poor taste, and reduced sensations when used for oral sex. Dental dams are often reappropriated by prison inmates for other uses, such as hair elastics, placemats or shoelaces. They are relatively expensive and difficult to obtain outside of the prison system. Rubber dams are not manufactured, marketed, registered, tested, or evaluated for their effectiveness as an STI prevention aid, and no studies exist (as of 2010) on their permeability to STI pathogens.

A 2022 NIH study found that "[d]ental dams can be an invaluable tool for safe oral sex, and it is important for patients to know how to use them properly[...]Although dental dams have been associated with a reduction in STIs, the lack of statistical significance may thus be explained in part by small sample sizes[...]From experience with patients in the STI clinic, the authors advise purchasing dental dams made specifically for oral sex because these are thinner than even the thinnest dental dams available for oral surgery[...]At this time, it is unclear if dental dams play a statistically significant role in decreasing incidence and transmission of STIs based on the current literature; this may be accounted for by factors, such as a paucity of data, infrequent use due to sparse patient education, perceived barriers to procurement and accessibility, and unfamiliarity on the part of providers. Condoms have repeatedly been shown to decrease STI risk; it is likely that dental dams will decrease risk as well when extrapolating the aforementioned data on condoms. Yet, there is a clear need for more provisional research on dental dams to ascertain their usage, perceived barriers, and efficacy in STI prevention."
