= David Schnarch =

American therapist (1946–2020)

David Morris Schnarch (/snɑːrʃ/ SNARSH); September 18, 1946, in New York City, New York – October 8, 2020, in Evergreen, Colorado) was an American couples, sex and trauma therapist, clinical psychologist and urologist.

== Work ==
Schnarch was professor of urology at the Louisiana State University Medical School in New Orleans, Louisiana, and led the Marriage & Family Health Center in Evergreen, Colorado, as Director. David Schnarch became known to the public through his research in the field of couple and sex therapy and related publications. Schnarch studied the widespread problem of people losing sexual desire in couple relationships, and suggested in the 1980s that the notion of self-differentiation introduced by Bowen was the real starting point for solving problems with intimacy and sexual desire.

His hypothesis was that a low degree of differentiation must inevitably lead to problems with intimacy and desire and that for this reason only a higher degree of differentiation is suitable for solving these problems. Guided by these considerations, he propagated an allegedly new form of psychotherapy, which differs in principle from classic, bond-based psychotherapies and called his development the "melting pot" approach. However, this conception of psychotherapy is anything but new, because C.G. Jung found the idea of differentiation in his conception of the "Individuation" process.

=== Differentiation-based psychotherapy ===
Differentiation-based psychotherapy is based on the theoretical assumptions of Murray Bowen and understands so-called self-differentiation as a central variable for human personality development. This form of psychotherapy aims to confront the client with themself, their actions and dilemmas, to help them through a process of self-knowledge, and to find new solutions to the problems that are burdening their life and relationships.

Schnarch used his melting-pot approach in particular for the treatment of problems with intimacy and in sexual relationships. Schnarch used collaborative confrontation as a central element in his therapy.

Therapy should help people to find a more balanced psychological balance when their own self ("Who am I and what do I want?") is in conflict with the need to establish connections with other people. Schnarch achieved this through collaborative confrontation (with himself and the partner), through self-confirmed (instead of third-party-confirmed) intimacy and through the promotion of self-respect and respect for others.

Differentiation-based psychotherapy has been included in the training program for psychiatrists and psychologists at some US universities. Its use is not limited to couple and sex therapy.

== Writings ==
- Constructing the Sexual Crucible: An Integration of Sexual and Marital Therapy. WW. Norton & Company, New York, 1991, ISBN 0-393-70102-6
- Passionate Marriage: Sex, Love & Intimacy in emotionally committed relationships. WW. Norton & Company, New York, 1997. ISBN 978-0393334272
- Resurrecting Sex: Solving Sexual Problems and Revolutionizing Your Relationship. HarperCollins, New York, 2002, ISBN 978-006-01935-91
- Intimacy & Desire: Awaken the Passion in Your Relationship Beaufort Books, New York, 2009. ISBN 978-1689933223
- Brain Talk. How Mind Mapping Brain Science Can Change Your Life & Everyone In It. Sterling Publishers, Hardcover, Pappband, 592 Seiten, ISBN 978-3-466-34758-2
