= Spreadeagle (position) =

Body pose

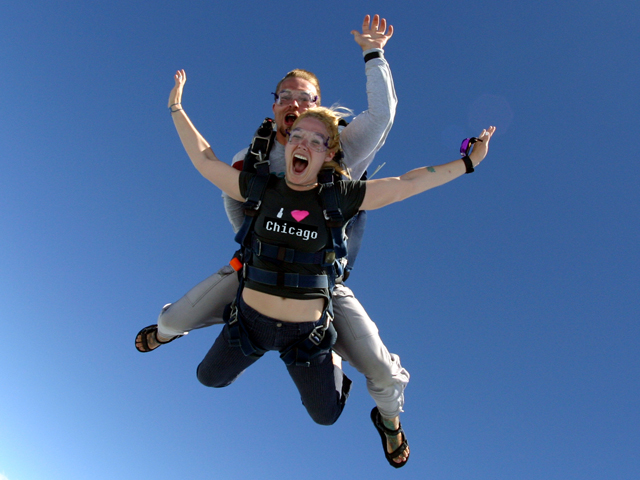
Use of spread eagle during skydiving

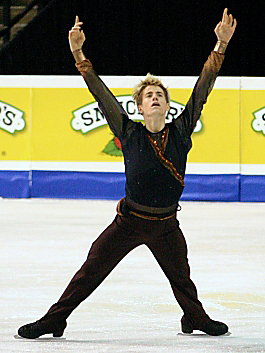
Jeffrey Buttle does an inside spread eagle at the 2004 Four Continents Championships in Hamilton

The spreadeagle (also spelled spread eagle or spread-eagle) is the position in which a person has their arms outstretched and legs apart, figuratively resembling an eagle with wings spread. It is a style that appears commonly in nature and geometry. In human style, it is represented by the letter "X".

== Sport ==
The spreadeagle position is frequently seen in various fields of human activity, particularly sports. It is commonly used in Olympic weightlifting, cheerleading, freestyle skiing, gymnastics, basketball, swimming and dance such as contemporary ballet. The spread eagle in figure skating is one of the moves in the field which makes the sport particularly associated with the position. It is also practiced in sky diving and appears in rock climbing and freestyle motocross.

== Sex position ==
The term spread eagle is used for sex positions where one of the partners adopts all or part of a spreadeagle position. One of the simplest versions has the lower partner lying on their back facing upwards (supine) with their arms and legs spread wide apart. It is a variant of the missionary position and it allows for deep sexual penetration. This position is also used for manual stimulation such as erotic massage of the G-spot or clitoral stimulation using the fingers or a sex toy. Clitoral stimulation can be performed by either partner and can be combined with penetrative sex. The position is also popular for oral sex which can be combined with vaginal massage. It is a comfortable position for the receiving partner to maintain, though the person providing the stimulation may experience neck discomfort. This may make it difficult for them to remain in place long enough for the receiving partner to reach orgasm.

There are a number of variations on the position. The reverse spreadeagle position is a less common version in which the lower partner lies facing down (prone). It is a variant of the doggy style position. If one leg is straight while the other is bent, the position is called the "broken eagle".

The variant known as the eagle or peace sign involves the lower partner lying on their back and holding their legs in the air spread wide apart in a "V" shape, though the arms are not usually spread. It is said to be better for stimulating the G-spot due to the angle of penetration. This can be done using a penis or a G-spot vibrator. The position is used for both vaginal and anal sex. The piledriver sex position, which is similar except that the lower partner's bottom is raised into the air to bring their feet close to the ground, can also be modified into a spread eagle version if the lower partner spreads their legs. This is sometimes called the soaring eagle.

The standing eagle variation adapts the spreadeagle to a vertical position. Typically the partner whose legs are spread is either pinned against a wall or stands on one leg and spreads the other. A variant exists that is easier for partners of different heights: one partner rests on the edge of a counter or bed with their legs spread while the other stands and penetrates them. Another vertical adaptation making use of furniture is the sofa spreadeagle: one partner stands on the edge of a bed or sofa or balances on two chairs and squats to allow for standing penetration.

The legs are also spread during the lesbian sexual practice known as scissoring.

== BDSM ==
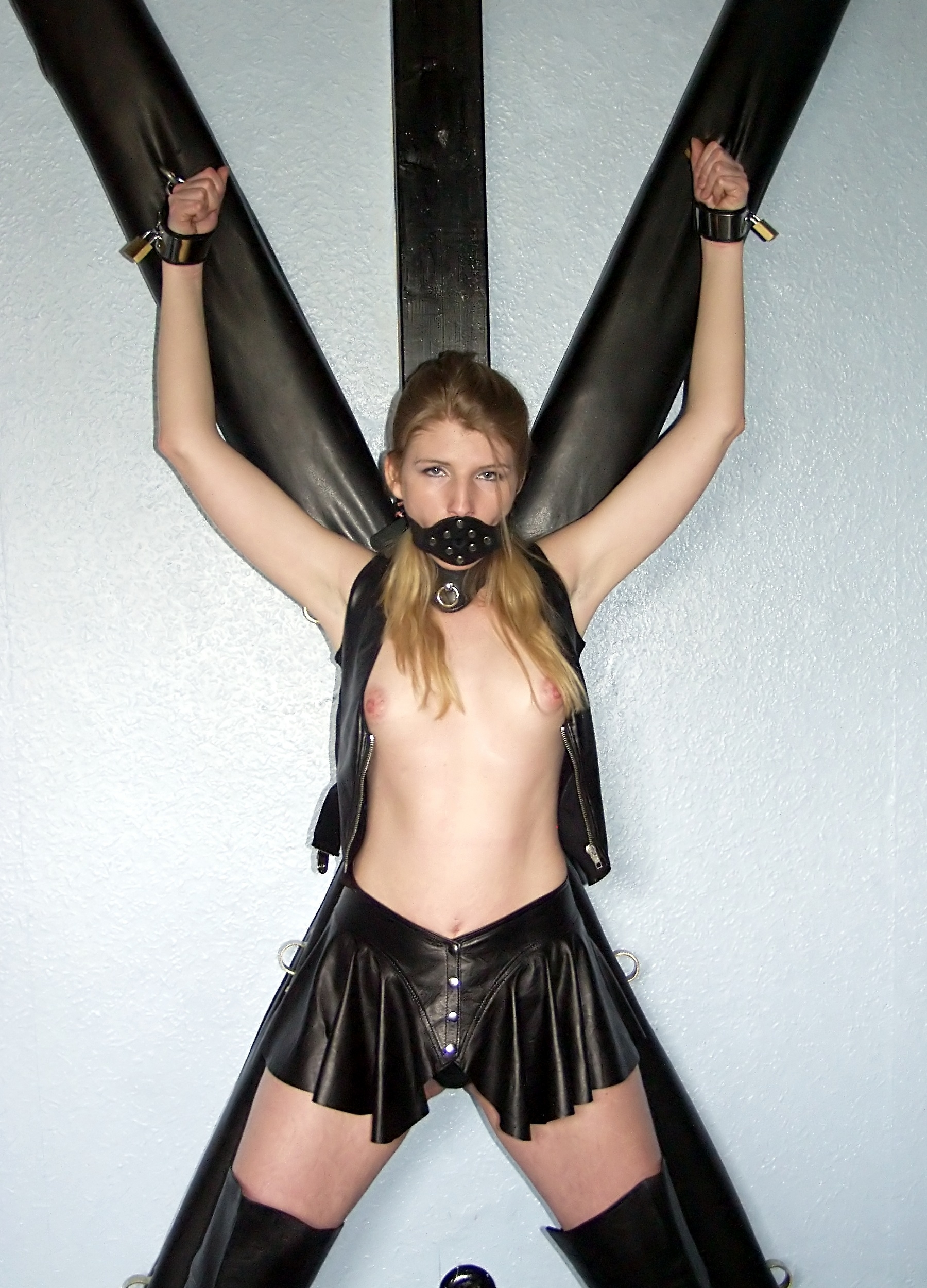
A woman with exposed breasts standing spreadeagle fixed to an X-cross.

The spread eagle position is also employed as a bondage position in BDSM play, with the submissive fastened to a bed, specially constructed table, sometimes face down or other equipment. The wrists and ankles are typically either fastened with ropes or with bondage cuffs attached to straps. Alternatively spreader bars are used to keep the wearer's legs or arms a set distance apart and produce a spread eagle position lying on the back or front.

An X-cross, a stationary bondage frame in the shape of an X, is often found in BDSM dungeons. It is designed to position and restrain a submissive in a spreadeagle position, restrained at the wrists, ankles and sometimes waist. X-crosses are typically vertical if wall-mounted or lean back at a slight angle if freestanding, and hence they restrain the subject in a standing spread eagle position. Alternatively this can also be achieved using ropes or chains attached to different endpoints.

A spreader bar suspended from the ceiling provides wrist attachment points for a vertical spread eagle position, either standing or hanging. A hanging spread eagle position is also used in suspension bondage, for which wooden or steel bondage rigs are sometimes found in BDSM dungeons. Spreader bars can also be used with subjects who are kneeling on all fours to give access to the buttocks, genitals and anal region.

Bondage in a spread eagle position provides immobility combined with a feeling of helplessness. It typically leaves much of the body available for BDSM play. This may include impact play, particularly if the subject is oriented with the back and buttocks exposed. Alternatively, if the front of the subject is exposed, erotic teasing may be undertaken.

Using the technique known an honor bondage, an unrestrained submissive may be commanded to assume a spreadeagle position, either standing with or without support or laying down, and not move. This produces extreme vulnerability and can be a source of erotic humiliation.

== Military punishment ==
During the American Civil War, soldiers convicted of theft, sleeping on duty, or cowardice could be punished by being tied spreadeagled to a large wooden wheel for five to six hours.

== See also ==
- Limb restraint
- Blood eagle – a method of ritual execution
