= Ekiben (disambiguation) =

Ekiben is a type of boxed meal, sold in Japan.

Ekiben may also refer to:

- Ekiben (film), a 1999 Japanese mock documentary film on the adult video industry
- Ekiben (sexual act), where a person is carried by their partner during sex
- Ekiben Hitoritabi, a Japanese manga series
