= Speculum al foder =

Catalan sex manual from the 1400s

Speculum al foder is an anonymous 15th-century Catalan text discovered in the 1970s. This text is significant as it is a rare example of known Medieval treatise describing the art of sexual positions (others examples include Aretino's I Modi ["The Ways"], also known as "The Sixteen Pleasures").
