= Spooning =

Sex position

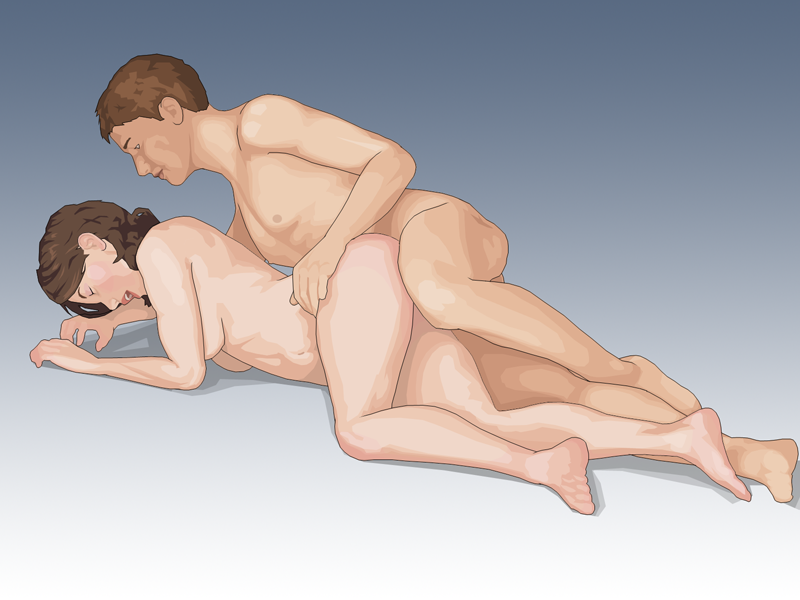
The spoons position in sex

The spoon position or spooning is both a sexual position and a cuddling technique. The name derives from the way that spoons may be positioned side by side, with bowls aligned.

The sexual spoons position is a form of a rear-entry position, another form being the doggy style position. It has been called one of the "basic four" sex positions.

== History ==
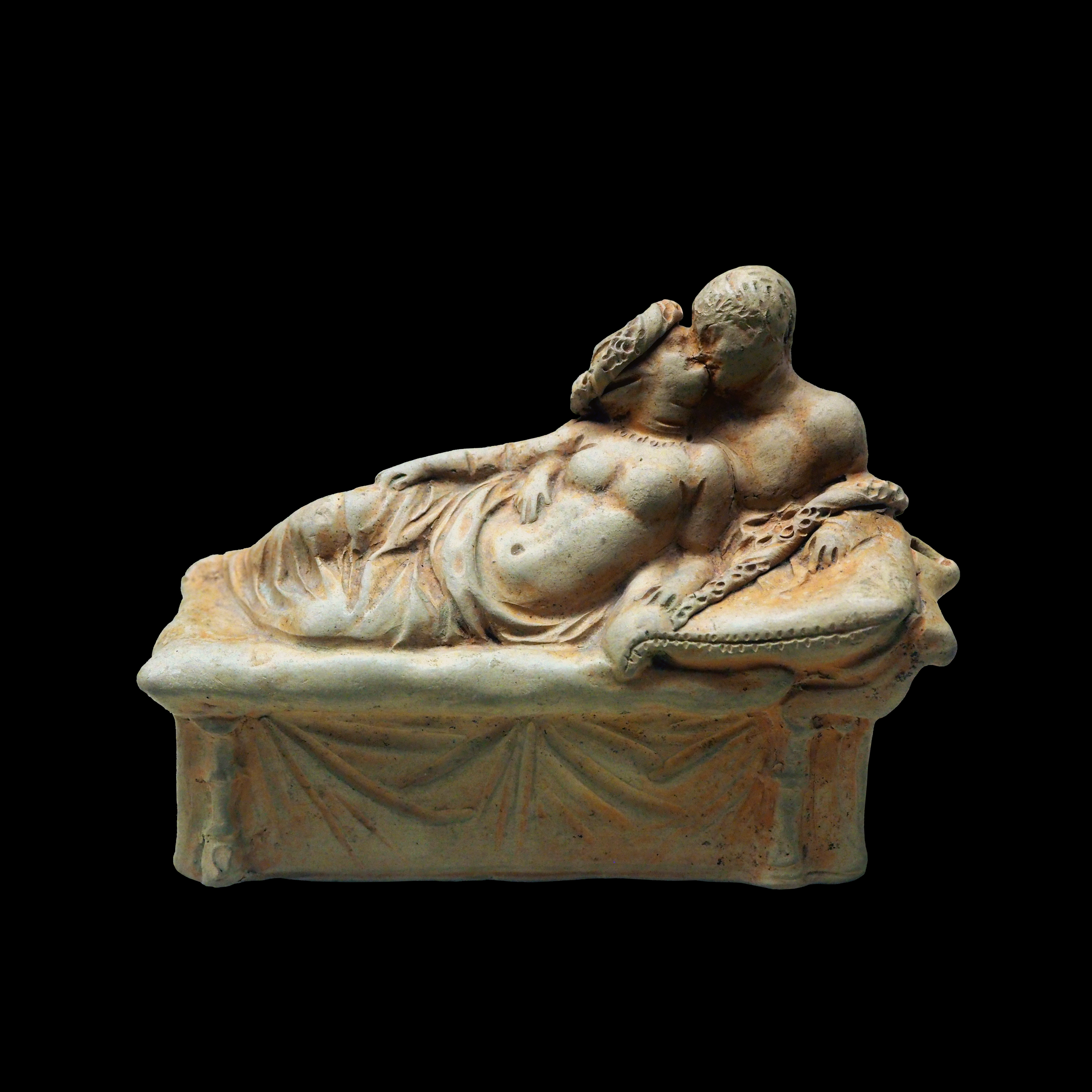
3rd century figurine of a couple spooning

The skeletons of the Alepotrypa cave dating back to the Neolithic era are on a spooning position. Most Roman erotic art depicted couples in the spoons position.

== Practice ==
In the spoons cuddling position, one partner lies on one side with knees bent while the other partner lies with their front pressed against their back. The spoons cuddling position is not limited to two people.

In the sex position, the receiving partner would be in the inner spoon position and the penetrator is in the outer spoon in preparation for rear-entry penetration. For penetration, the partners may separate their upper bodies, with just the pelvises connecting, and their legs can also rest on top of each other. The receiving partner may lift the upper knee to allow for easier penetration.

During heterosexual sexual activity, the penetrating partner can caress the woman's stomach and stimulate her breasts, the back of the neck and ears, and clitoris. The woman can stimulate her own clitoris or her partner's scrotum. In addition, the penis stimulates the front of the vagina, and may stimulate an area that is commonly termed the G-spot. Along with the doggy style position, this may be the best position from which to stimulate this area.

Variations on this position include the partners lying on their sides face-to-face or in the scissors position. Anal sex is also possible in this position, along with use of a vibrator.

== Advantages and disadvantages ==
The spoons position allows for a great deal of physical intimacy, as there is full-body contact which allows for cuddling. Both partners have control of the angle and depth of penetration, and slow, low-intensity sex can last for a long time because it usually takes longer for the man to reach orgasm. However, there is little visual stimulation for either partner, as they are not facing one another and cannot see each other's bodies fully. The penis can also slip out easily.

The spoons position may be preferred by couples who have just woken up or are very tired. It may be used if the woman is pregnant, even during the last trimester, because it does not put any pressure on the abdomen. It is also good for those recovering from illness or surgery, or the elderly, because it puts less strain on muscles.
