= Doggy style =

Sex position

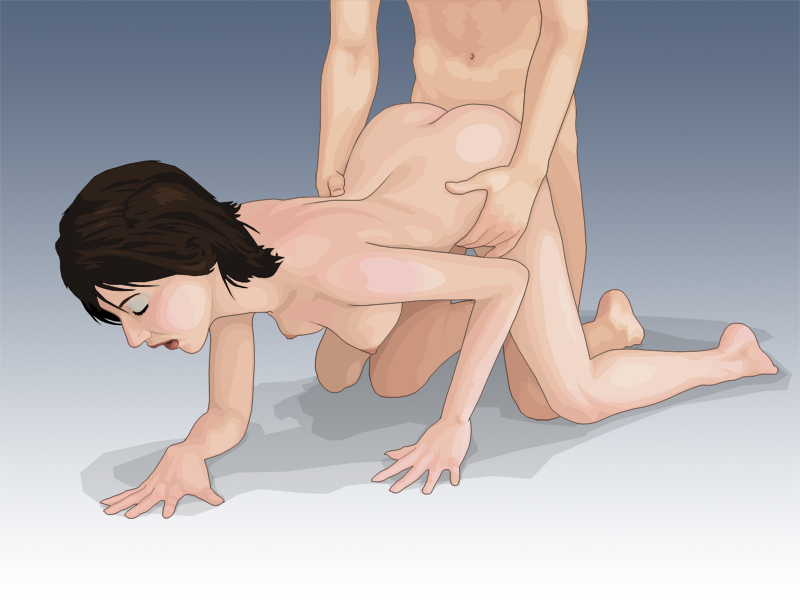
Illustration of the doggy style position

Doggy style is a sex position in which one participant bends over, crouches on all fours (usually on hands and knees), or lies on their abdomen, for sexual intercourse, other forms of sexual penetration or other sexual activity. Doggy style is a form of rear-entry position, others being the spooning position in which the receiving partner lies on their side or the reverse cowgirl sex position. Non-penetrative sex in this position may also be regarded as doggy style.

Between sex partners, the person in the doggy style position is usually passive, while the other partner is active (although sometimes it can be the other way around if the person in doggy position backs up into their partner behind them). Either partner may be the dominant partner or the submissive partner.

== History and etymology ==
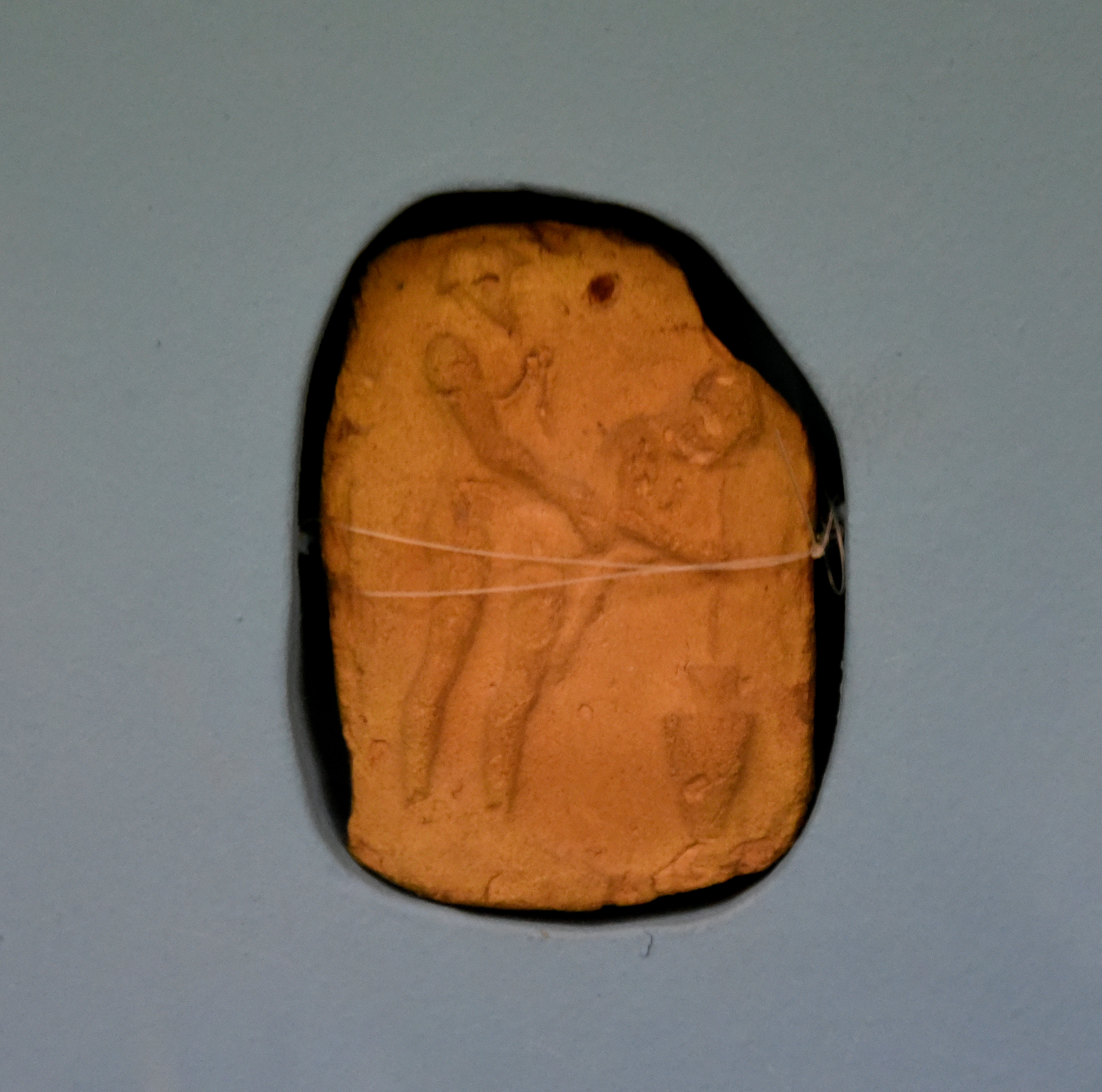
Erotic plaque depicting the doggy style intercourse between a man and a woman. From Iraq, Old Babylonian Period, 2000–1500 BCE. Museum of the Ancient Orient, Istanbul.

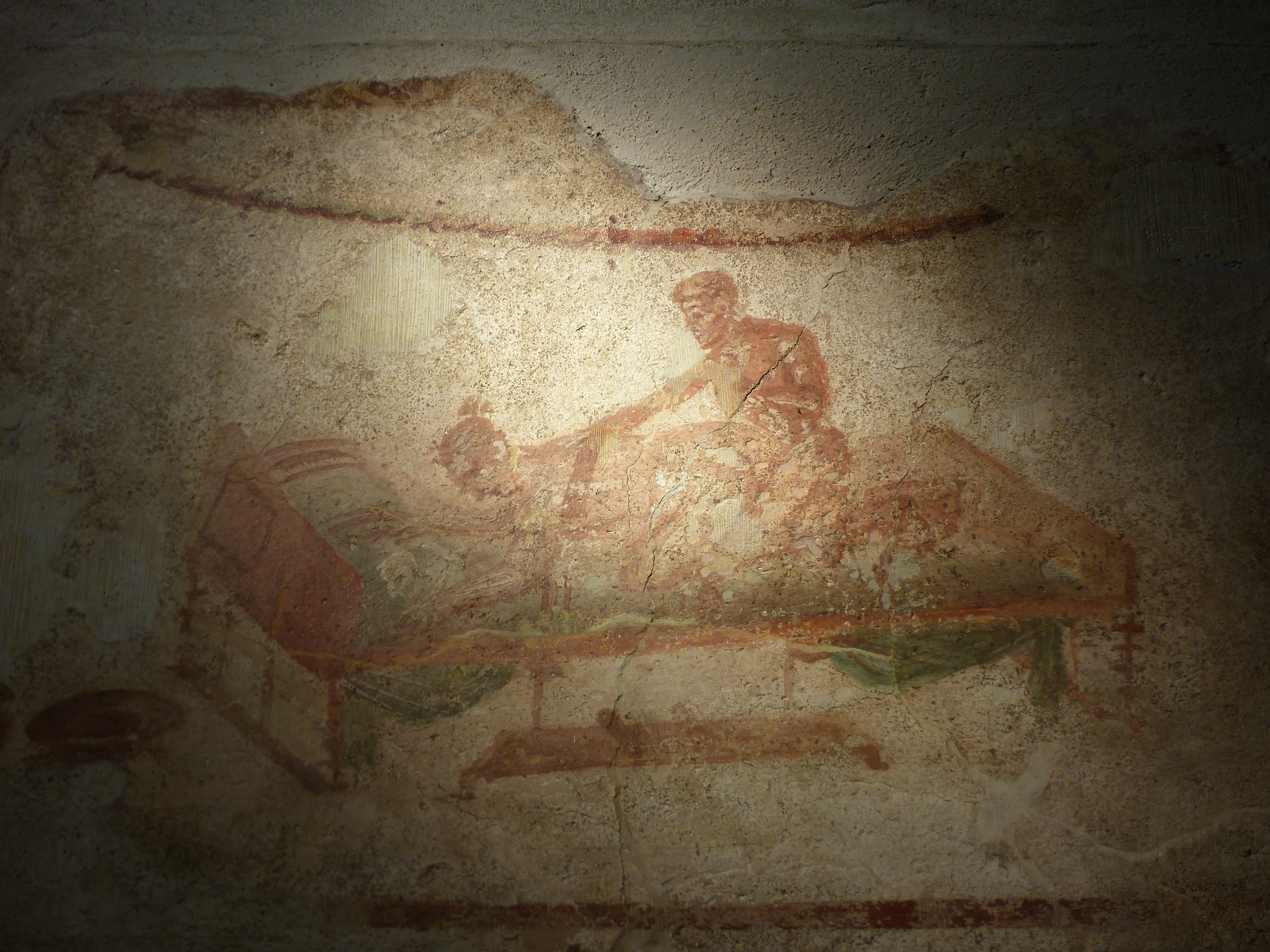
Erotic art in Pompeii and Herculaneum depicting heterosexual entrance from rear position

In ancient Rome, this practice was known as coitus more ferarum, Latin for "sexual intercourse in the manner of wild beasts." Lucretius said it was "generally thought" this manner was best for conception: the proper parts could "take the seeds with chests laid down and loins raised up."

=== English ===
The specific origin of the term doggy style is not known, but is presumably a reference to the initial position assumed by dogs when mating. It is described in the Kama Sutra as the cow position or the congress of a cow, and is listed in The Perfumed Garden.

== Practices ==
The posture adopted by the receiving partner resembles lordosis behaviour – a physical posture seen in many female mammals, often when they are ready for sex/mating, the primary characteristic of which is a ventral arching of the spine. During vaginal penetration from behind, the penis may penetrate deeper into the vagina, reaching preferential contact with the posterior wall of the vagina and probably reaching the posterior fornix; while in the missionary position, it is in preferential contact with the anterior wall of the vagina and the tip of the penis can reach the anterior fornix.

Besides other potential sex acts, the active partner may also massage or stimulate the receiving partner's erogenous zones, such as the genitals, nipples, buttocks, administer a spanking, or introduce a sex toy, such as a dildo or vibrator, into the vagina or anus. The doggy position may be erotic or sexually provocative for participants.

== Advantages and disadvantages ==
Doggy style may be a preferred sex position if either partner has back issues or some other medical conditions. During doggy style, the scrotum sometimes provides friction to the clitoris, thus possibly producing an orgasm or sexual stimulation in the woman. For some women, doggy-style sex helps stimulate an area known as "the G-spot." However, this position may provide only minimal stimulation of the clitoris, so some women may require finger stimulation to achieve orgasm. Some men, however, may be able to stimulate both the G-spot and the clitoris simultaneously using the penis and the scrotum, respectively, during doggy-style sex.

Doggy style offers benefits as a sex position in group sex, such as during a threesome. Doggy style allows the passive partner to perform fellatio on male participant (termed "spitroast") or to perform cunnilingus on a female participant.

Some women may feel vulnerable in this position, as it requires and implies a level of trust and a surrender of control by the receiving to the active partner. However, some women find this transfer of control to the partner arousing. According to the book Sexual Pleasure by Barbara Keesling, many established couples find doggy style relationship-affirming.

Some consider doggy style to be unromantic. The position is considered by some to be less intimate because eye contact and kissing are more difficult. However, in a 2018 survey of millennials it was found to be the most popular sex position.

== As a theme in art ==
Doggy style has been known in most cultures in all times, and has been depicted in art:

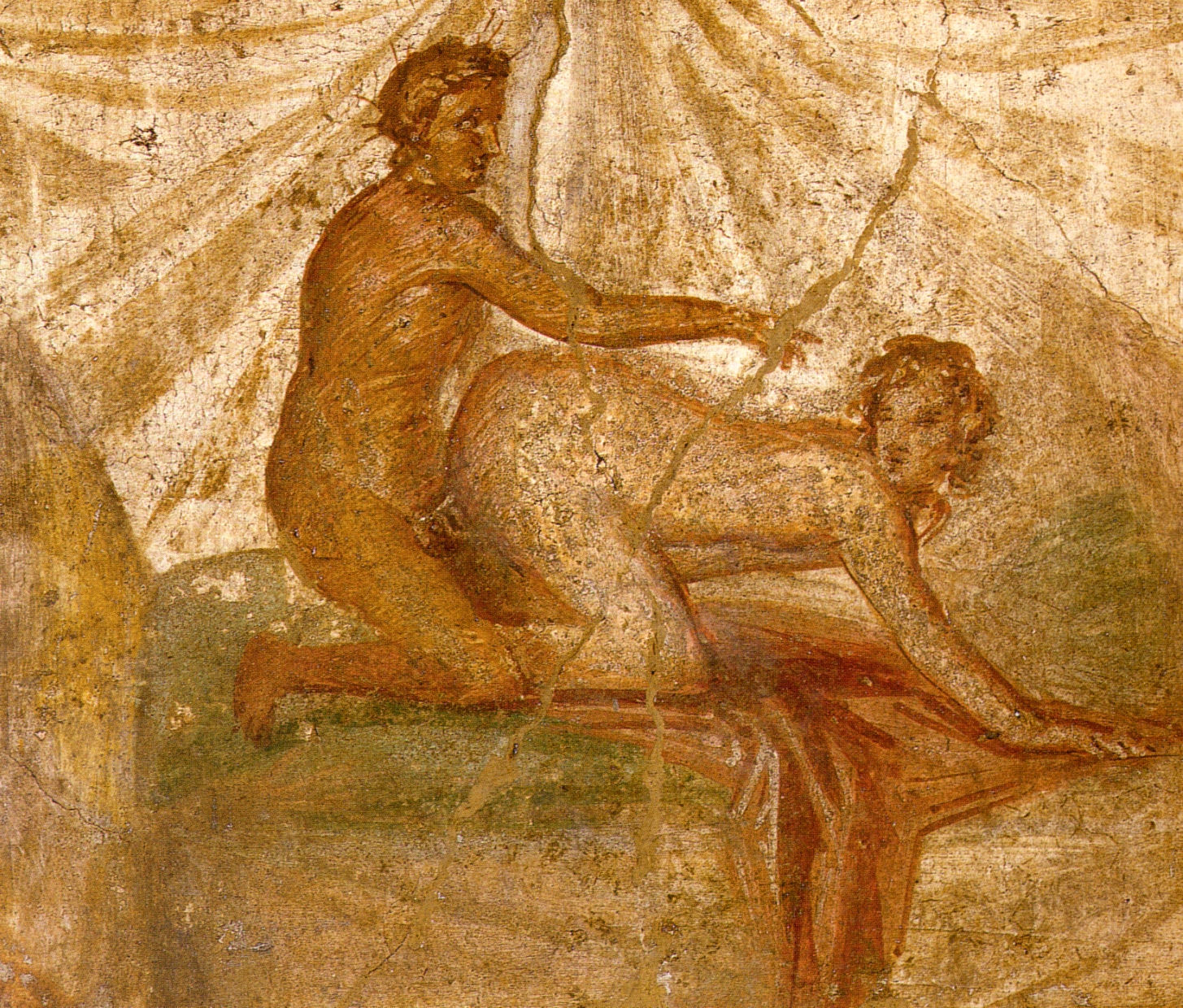
Pompeian Styles

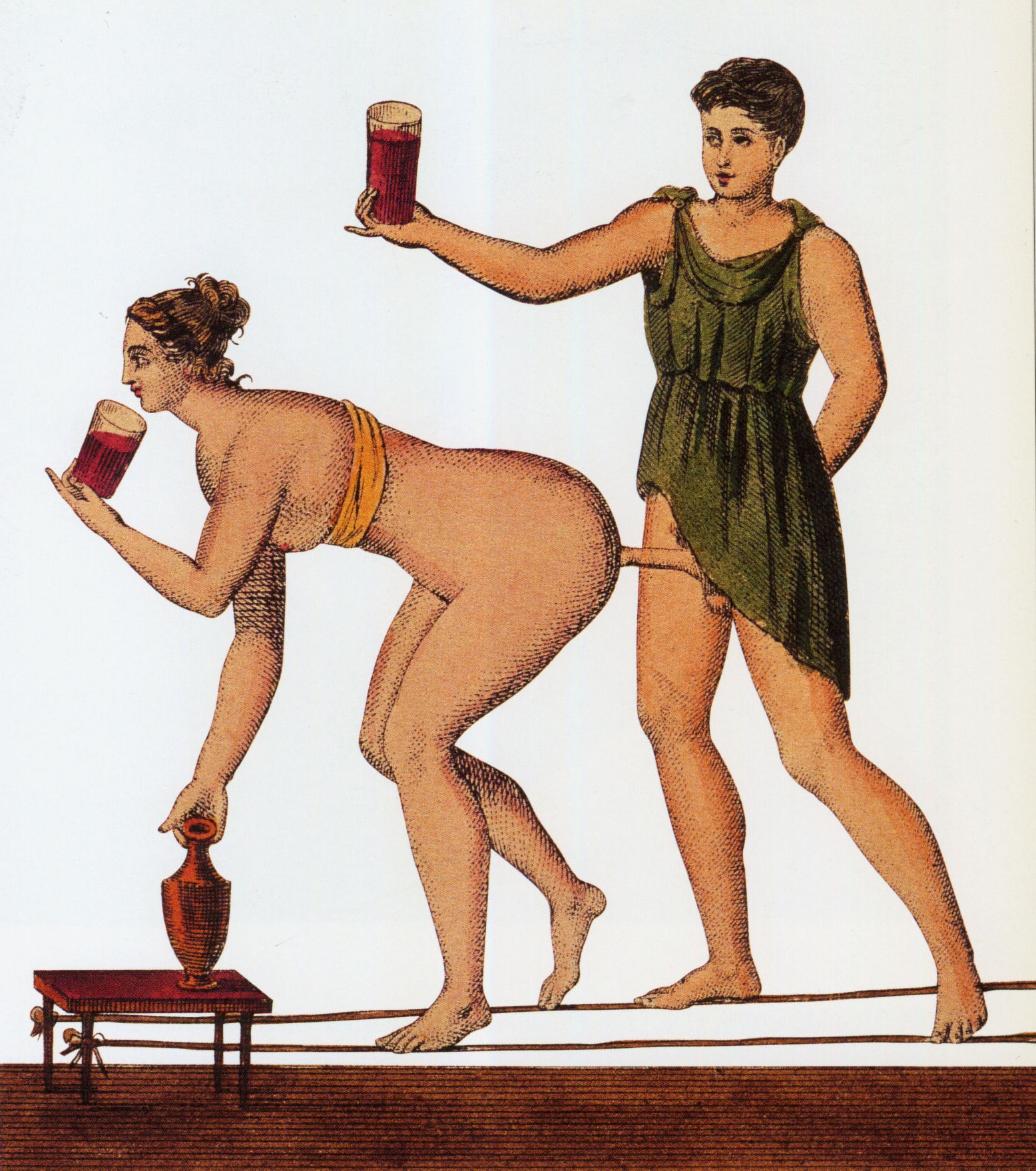
Pompeii – Osteria della Via di Mercurio

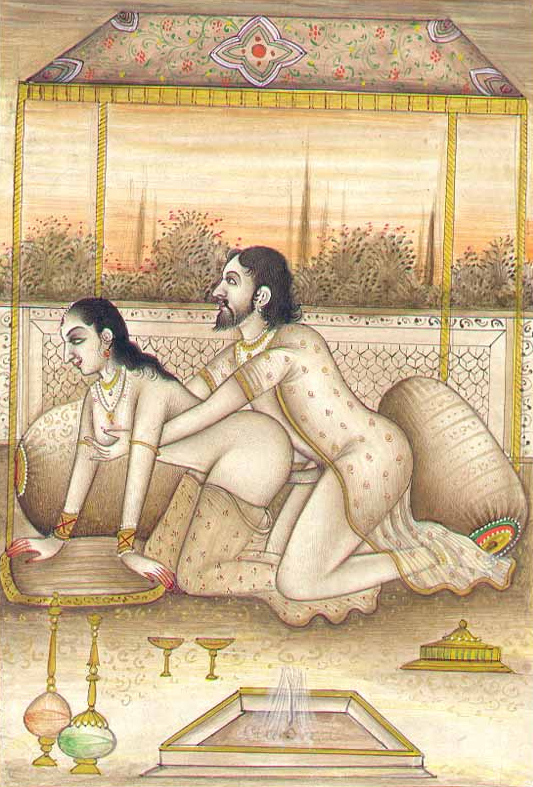
Kama Sutra – A Mughal couple performing doggy-style

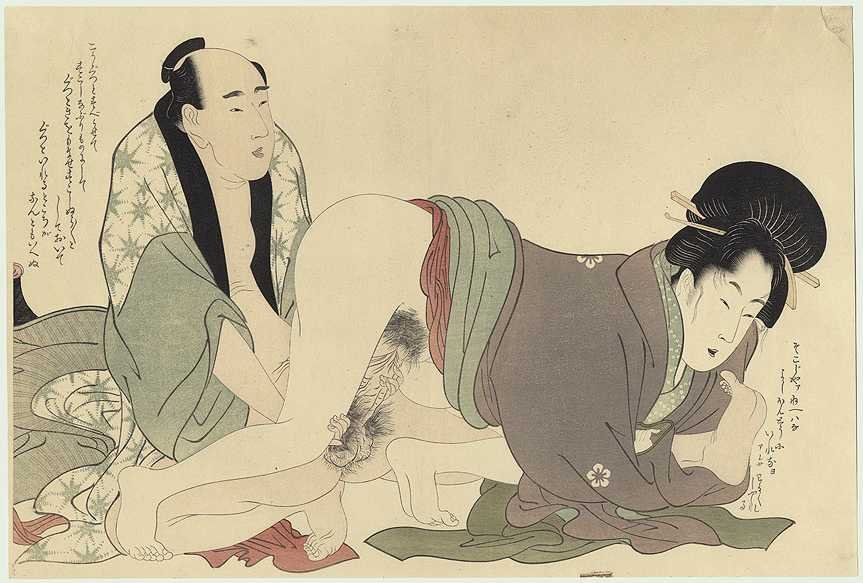
Utamaro, 1799

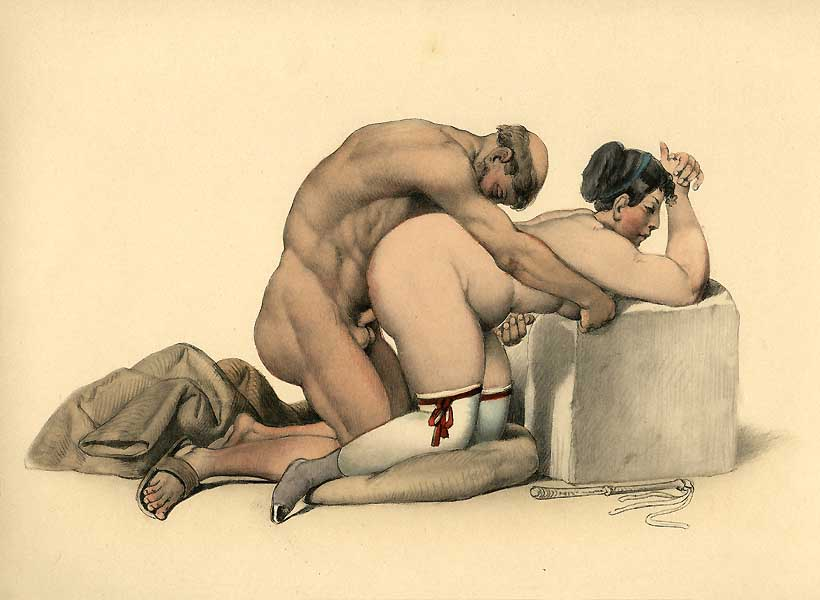
Peter Johann Nepomuk Geiger

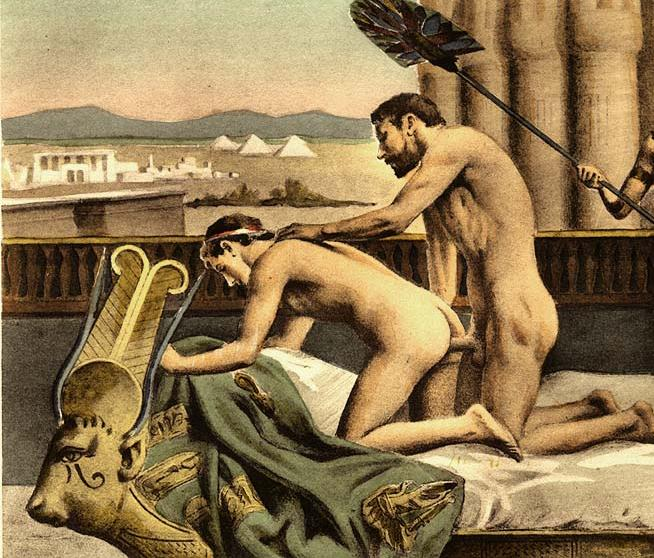
Édouard-Henri Avril – Hadrian and Antinous in the doggy style position

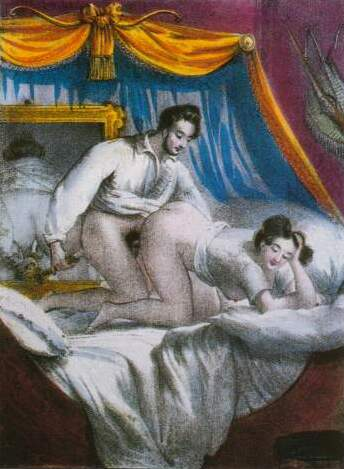
Achille Devéria – a couple having doggy style sex

== See also ==
- Pegging
- Dogging (sexual slang)
