= Ekiben (sexual act) =

Sex position

The Ekiben (駅弁) sexual position

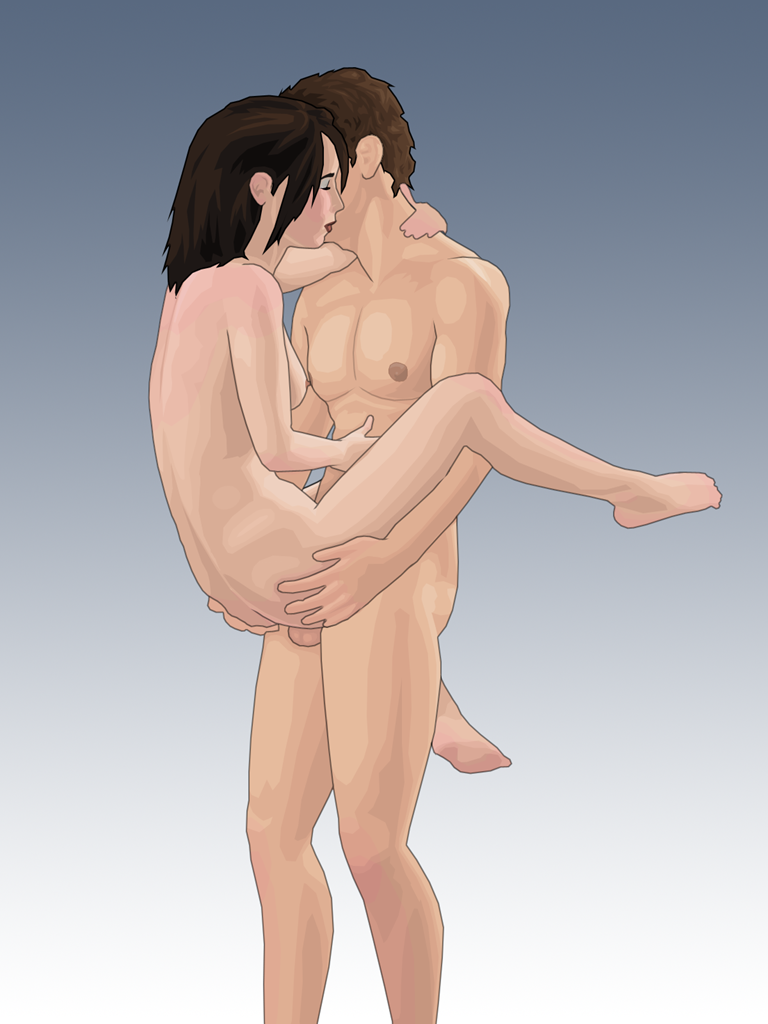
The standard position

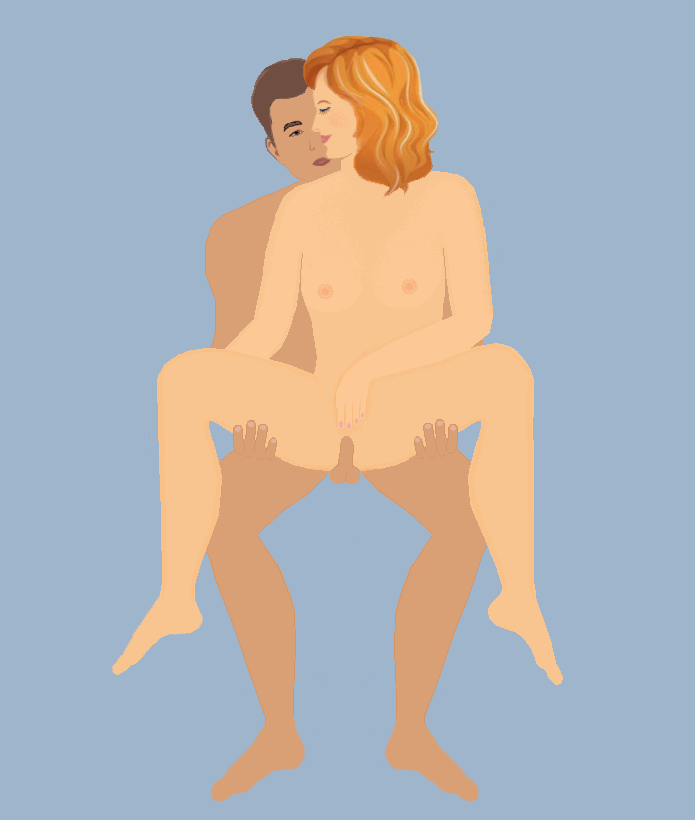
The reverse position

The position is named after food boxes sold by Japanese vendors at train stations or sporting events which resemble the position

Ekiben (Japanese: 駅弁) is a sex position that consists of a person being carried by their partner while having sex with them.

== Etymology ==
The act itself is named after the box that is filled with food that is sold by vendors walking around train stations or sporting events, ekiben. The term was first popularized by Japanese male actor, Chocoball Mukai.

== Practice ==
The act usually involves a male partner lifting his female partner face to face with his penis inserted inside her vagina, and having sex while standing. The term can also apply when the act is done sitting down or when the lifted partner is held against a wall.

Another form of this position is known as haimen ekiben (背面駅弁) or reverse ekiben, the same act only with the person being penetrated facing in the direction opposite to that of the "standard" ekiben position (i.e. both partners face in the same direction).
