= Piledriver (sex position) =

Sex position

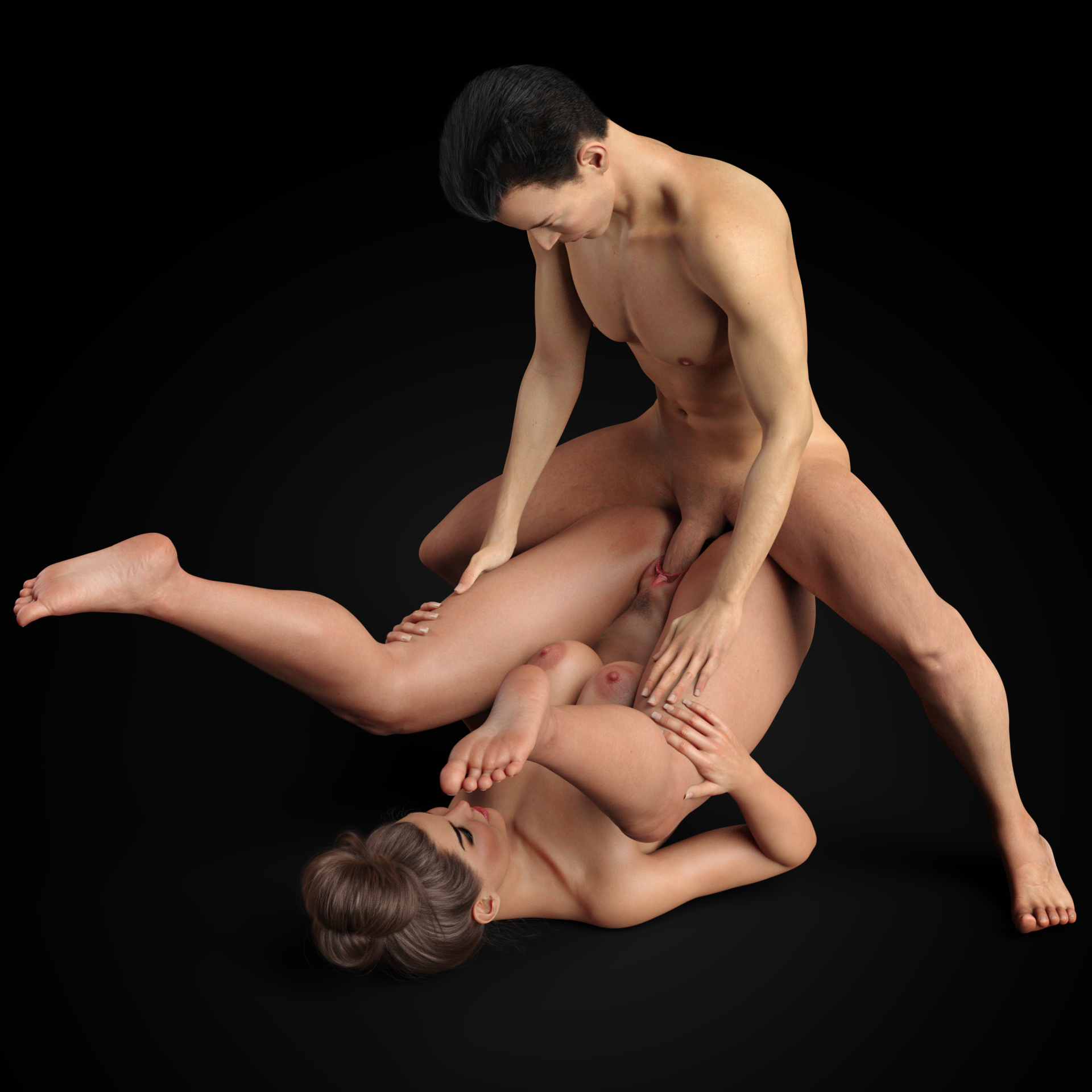
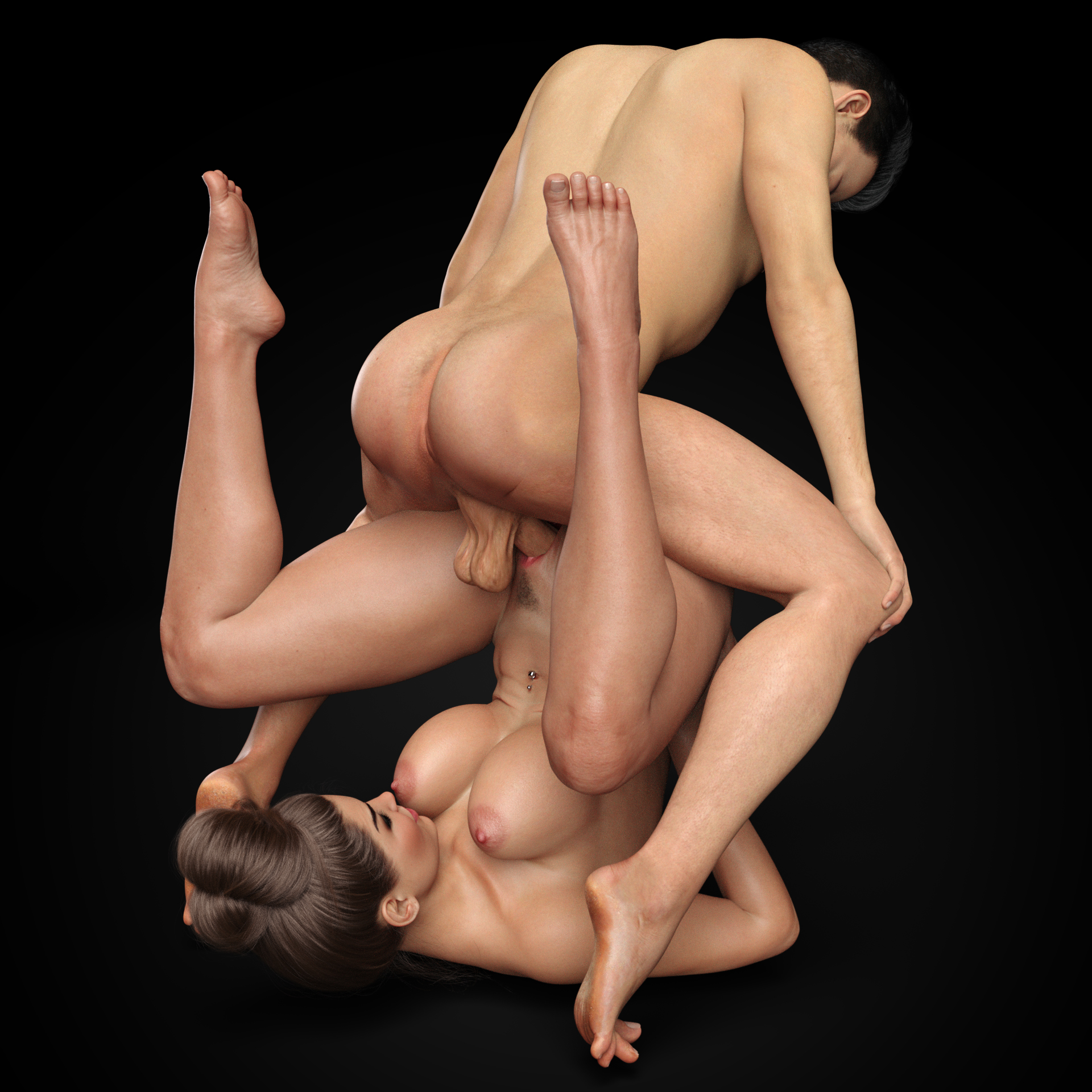
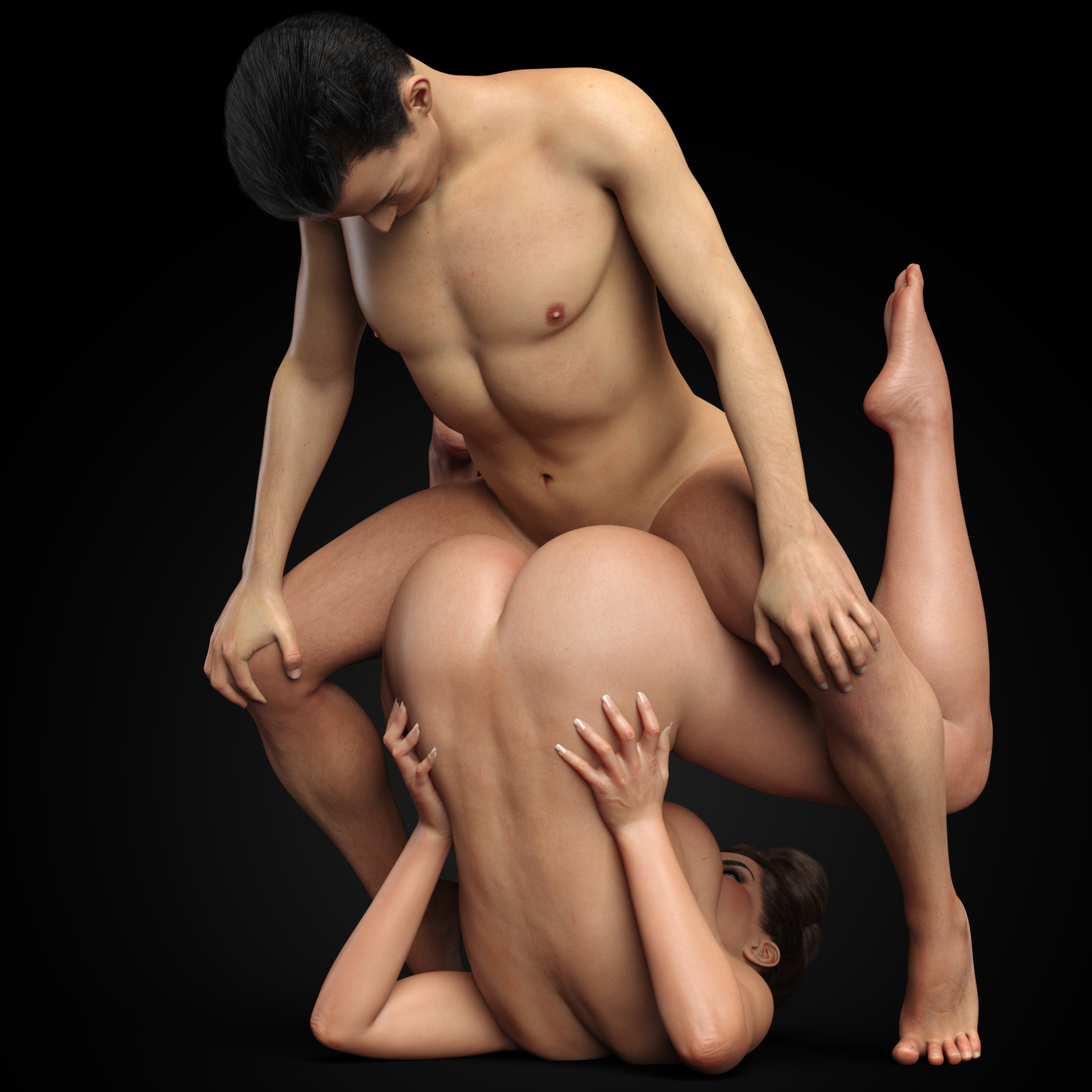
A couple engaged in the piledriver position:
Left: Forward position (facing each other), Center: Reverse position (female perspective), Right: Reverse position (male perspective)

The piledriver is a sexual position. Named after the downward motion of an actual pile driver, the position is executed by the receiving partner lying supine bent into a front bend in a pose similar to the yoga plow pose, bottom up, with legs bent over head, while the inserting partner stands above and inserts a penis or other object downwards into the receptive partner's vagina or anus.

Though the position is quite strenuous for both participants, it is particularly so for the receptive partner, who is severely constrained by the front bend. The risk of penile fracture is higher in this position, so the male partner needs to be careful.
