= Sex position =

Position of the body used for sexual activities

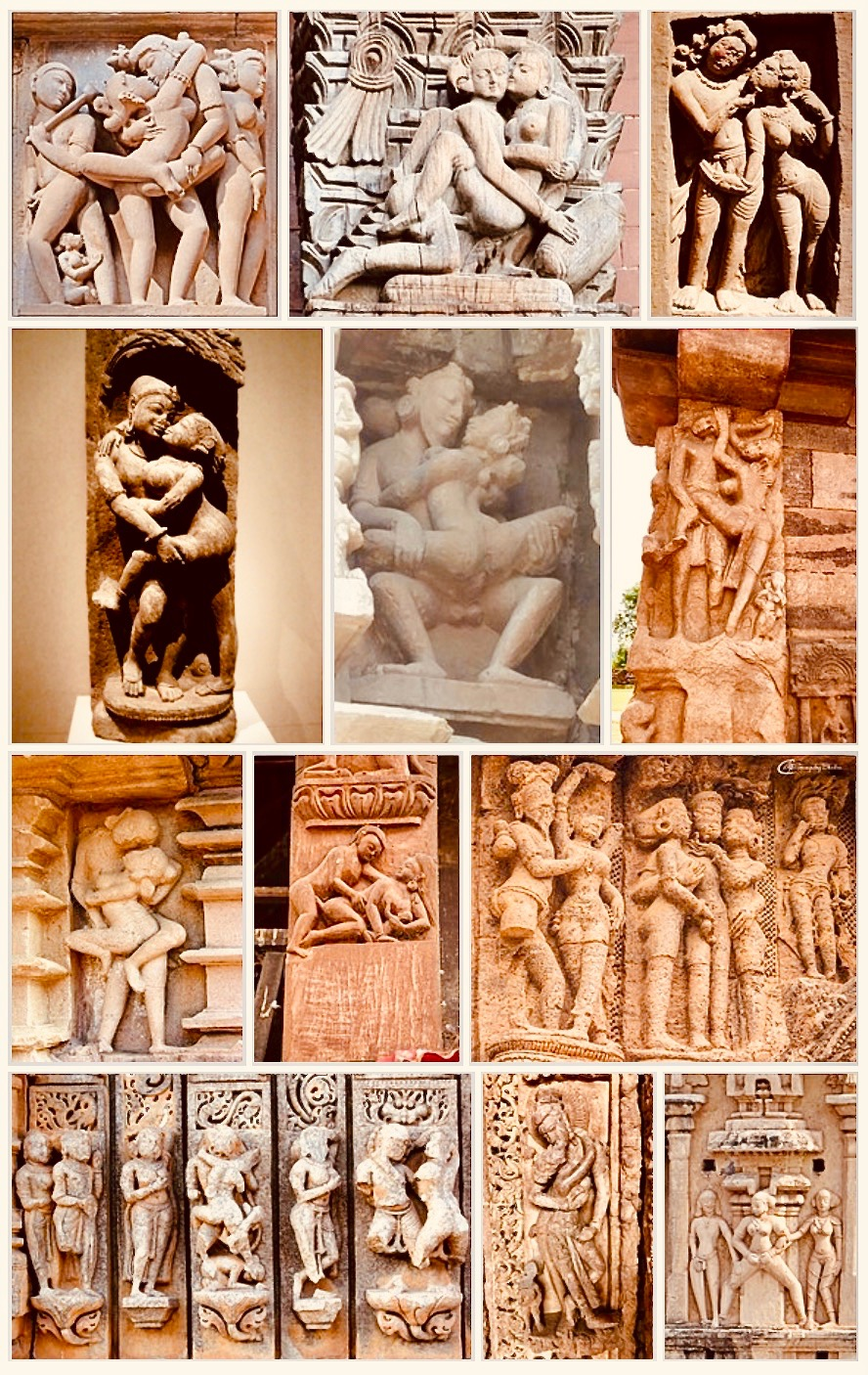
Kama-related arts are common in Hindu temples. These scenes include various sex positions. Above: 6th- to 14th-century temples in Madhya Pradesh, Uttar Pradesh, Rajasthan, Gujarat, Karnataka, Chhattisgarh, Odisha, Tamil Nadu, Andhra Pradesh and Nepal.

A sex position is a positioning of the bodies that people use to engage in sexual intercourse or other sexual activities. Sexual acts are generally described by the positions the participants adopt in order to perform the acts. Though sexual intercourse generally involves penetration of the body of one person by another, sex positions commonly involve non-penetrative sexual activities.

Three broad and overlapping categories of sexual activity are commonly practiced: vaginal sex, anal sex, and oral sex (mouth-on-genital or mouth-on-anus). Sex acts may also be part of a fourth category, manual sex, which is stimulating the genitals or anus by using fingers or hands. Some acts may include stimulation by a device (sex toy), such as a dildo or vibrator. There are numerous sex positions that participants may adopt in any of these types of sex acts, and some authors have argued that the number of sex positions is essentially limitless.

== History ==
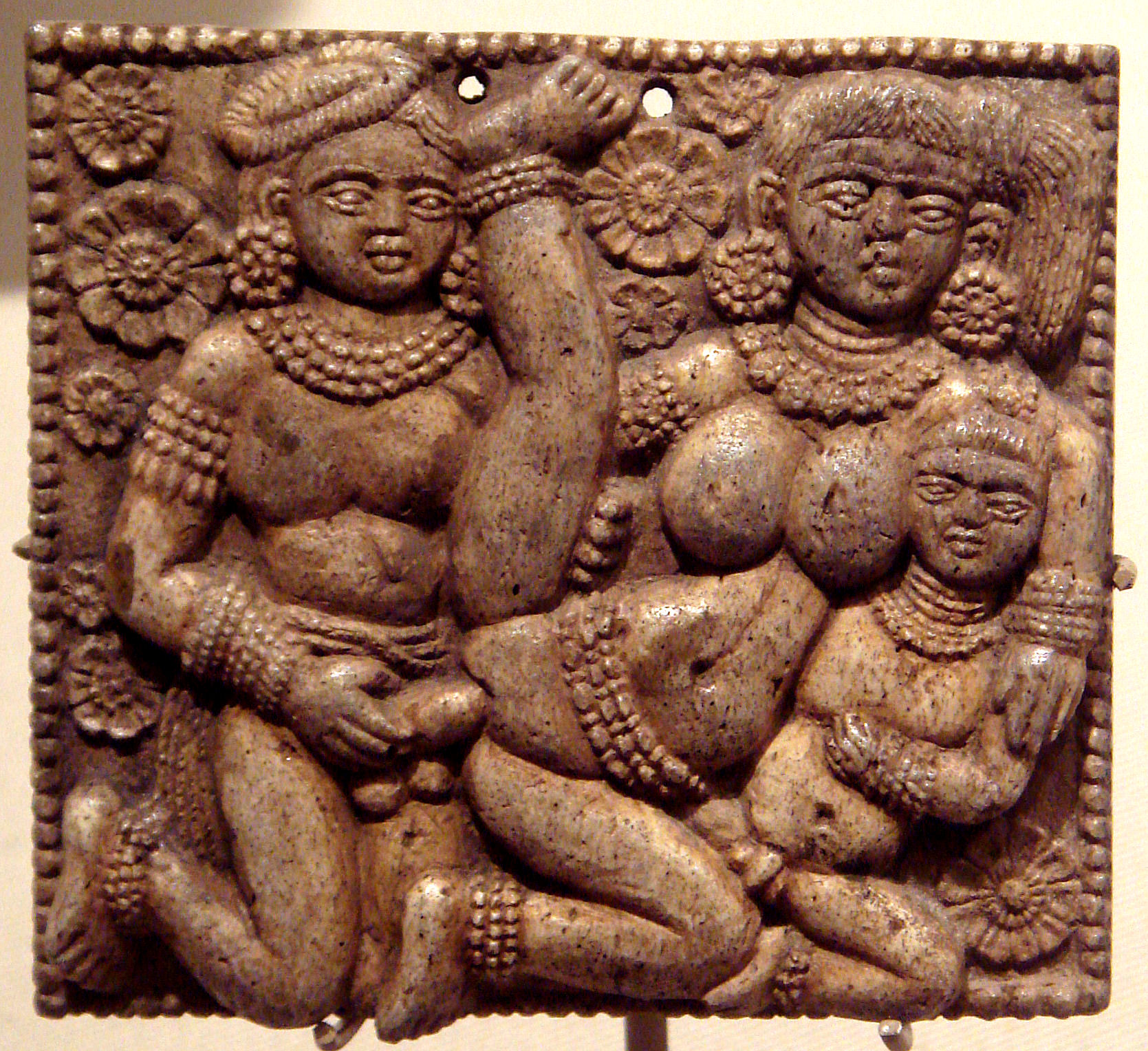
A love scene sculpture from the Sunga period (c. 1st century BC)

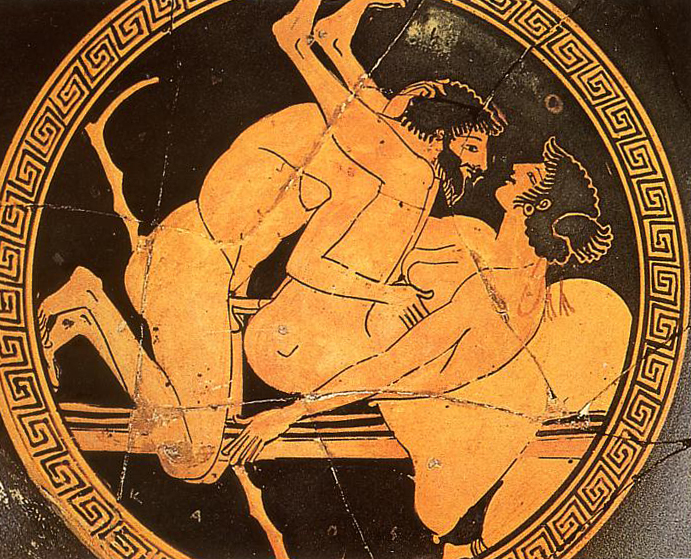
Tondo of an Attic red-figure kylix by the Triptolemos Painter, c. 470 BC, Tarquinia National Museum

Sex manuals typically present a guide to sex positions. They have a long history. In the Greco-Roman era, a sex manual was written by Philaenis of Samos, possibly a hetaira (courtesan) of the Hellenistic period (3rd–1st century BC). The Kama Sutra of Vatsyayana, believed to have been written in the 1st to 6th centuries, has a notorious reputation as a sex manual. Different sex positions result in differences in the depth and angle of sexual penetration. Alfred Kinsey categorized six primary positions. The earliest known European medieval text dedicated to sexual positions is the Speculum al foder, (The Mirror of Coitus) a 15th-century Catalan text discovered in the 1970s.

== Exclusively penetrative ==
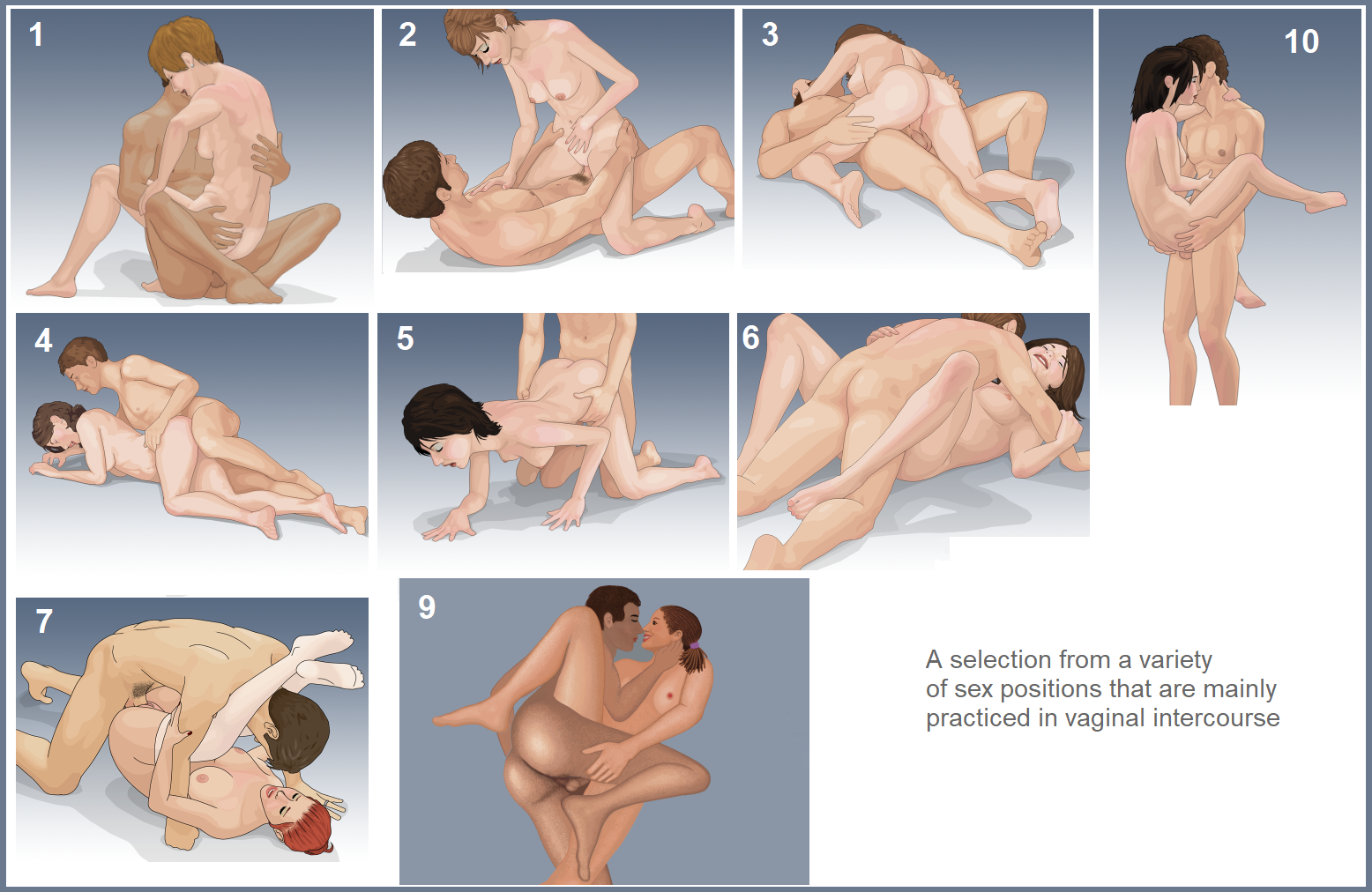
Ten illustrations of sexual positions involving penile-vaginal penetration

These positions involve the insertion of a phallic object(s) (such as a penis, strap-on dildo, plug, or other nonporous object(s)) into a vagina, anus or mouth.

=== Penetrating partner on top with front entry ===
In the missionary position, the participants face each other. The receiving partner lies on their back with legs apart, while the penetrating partner lies on top. This position and the following variations may be used for vaginal or anal intercourse.

- The penetrating partner stands in front of the receiving partner, whose legs dangle over the edge of a bed or some other platform like a table.
- With the receiving partner's legs lifted towards the ceiling and resting against the penetrating partner, this is sometimes called the butterfly position. This can also be done as a kneeling position.
- The receiving partner lies on their back. The penetrating partner stands and lifts the receiving partner's pelvis for penetration. A variant is for the receiving partner to rest their legs on the penetrating partner's shoulders.
- The receiving partner lies on their back, legs pulled up straight and knees near to the head. The penetrating partner holds the receiving partner's legs and penetrates from above.
- Similarly to the previous position, but the receiving partner's legs need not be straight and the penetrating partner wraps their arms around the receiving partner to push the legs as close as possible to the chest. Called the stopperage in Burton's translation of The Perfumed Garden.
- The coital alignment technique, a position where a woman is vaginally penetrated by a man, and the penetrating partner moves upward along the woman's body until the penis is pointing down, the dorsal side of the penis now rubbing against the clitoris.
- The receiving partner crosses their feet behind their head (or at least puts their feet next to their ears), while lying on their back. The penetrating partner then holds the receiving partner tightly around each instep or ankle and lies on the receiving partner full-length. A variation is to have the receiving partner cross their ankles on their stomach, knees to shoulders, and then have the penetrating partner lie on the receiving partner's crossed ankles with their full weight. Called the Viennese oyster by The Joy of Sex.

=== Penetrating from behind ===
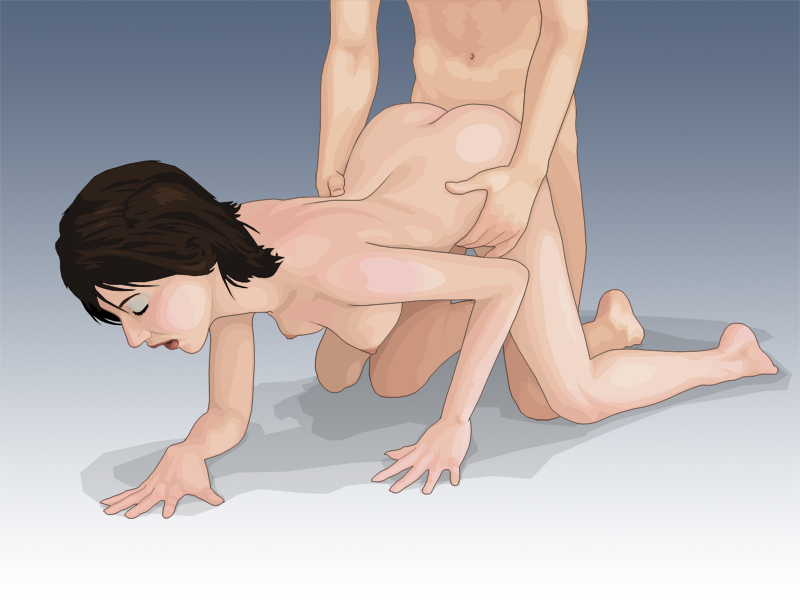
A rear-penetration position, commonly referred to as 'doggy style'

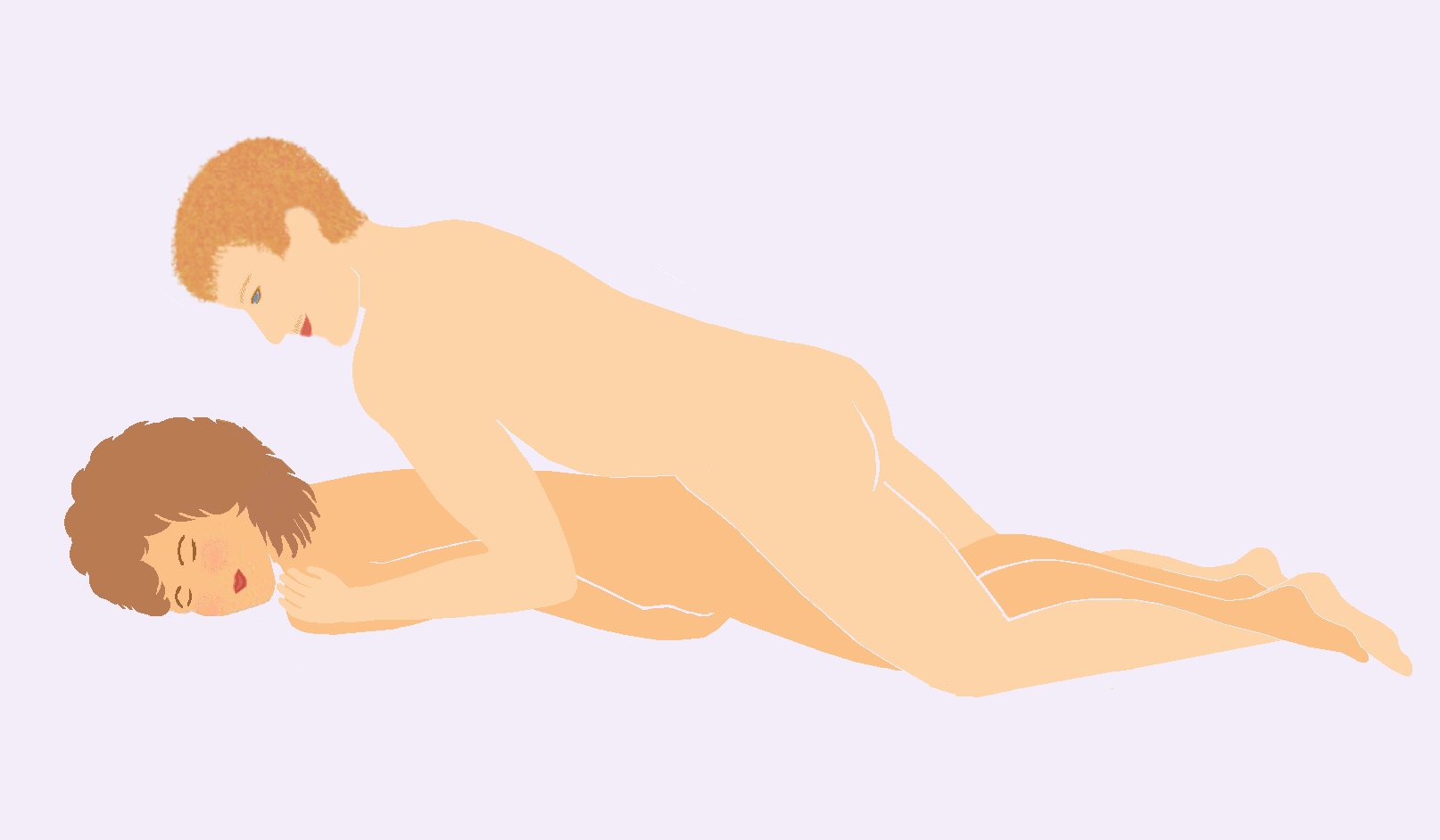
Doggy style in the lying position

Known as doggy style, most of these positions can be used for either vaginal or anal penetration. Variants include:

- The receiving partner is on all fours with their torso horizontal and the penetrating partner inserts either their penis or sex toy into either the vagina or anus from behind.
- The receiving partner's torso is angled downwards and the penetrating partner raises their own hips above those of the receiving partner for maximum penetration.
- The penetrating partner places their feet on each side of the receiving partner while keeping their knees bent and effectively raising up as high as possible while maintaining penetration. The penetrating partner's hands usually have to be placed on the receiving partner's back to keep from falling forward.
- The receiving partner kneels upright while the penetrating partner gently pulls the receiving partner's arms backwards at the wrists towards them.

In the spoons position both partners lie on their side, facing the same direction. Variants of this technique include the following:

- The receiving partner lies on their side. The penetrating partner kneels and penetrates from behind. Alternatively, the penetrating partner can stand if the receiving partner is on a raised surface.
- The receiving partner lies facing down in prone position, possibly with their legs spread. The penetrating partner lies on top of them. The placement of a pillow beneath the receiving partner's hips can help increase stimulation in this position.
- The receiving partner lies face down, knees together. The penetrating partner lies on top with spread legs.
- The receiving partner lies on their side with their uppermost leg forward. The penetrating partner kneels astride the receiver's lowermost leg.

=== Receiving partner on top ===
The 'cowgirl' position

Most of these positions can be used for either vaginal or anal penetration. When the receiving partner is a woman, these positions are sometimes called the woman on top, or cowgirl positions.

A feature of these positions is that the penetrating partner lies on their back with the receiving partner on top:

- The receiving partner can kneel while straddling the penetrating partner, with the participants facing each other.
- Alternatively, the receiving partner can face away from the penetrating partner. This position is sometimes called the reverse cowgirl position.
- The receiving partner can arch back with hands on the ground.
- The receiving partner can squat (instead of kneel) facing the penetrating partner.
- The receiving partner can bring forward their knees against the ground.
- The penetrating partner lies with their upper back on a low table, couch, chair or edge of bed, keeping their feet flat on the floor and back parallel to floor. The receiving partner straddles them, also keeping their feet on the floor. Receiving partner can assume any of various positions.
- The lateral coital position was recommended by Masters and Johnson, and was preferred by three quarters of their heterosexual study participants after having tried it. The position involves the male on his back, with the female rolled slightly to the side so that her pelvis is atop his, but her weight is beside his. This position can also be used for anal penetration, and is not limited to heterosexual partners.

=== Sitting and kneeling ===
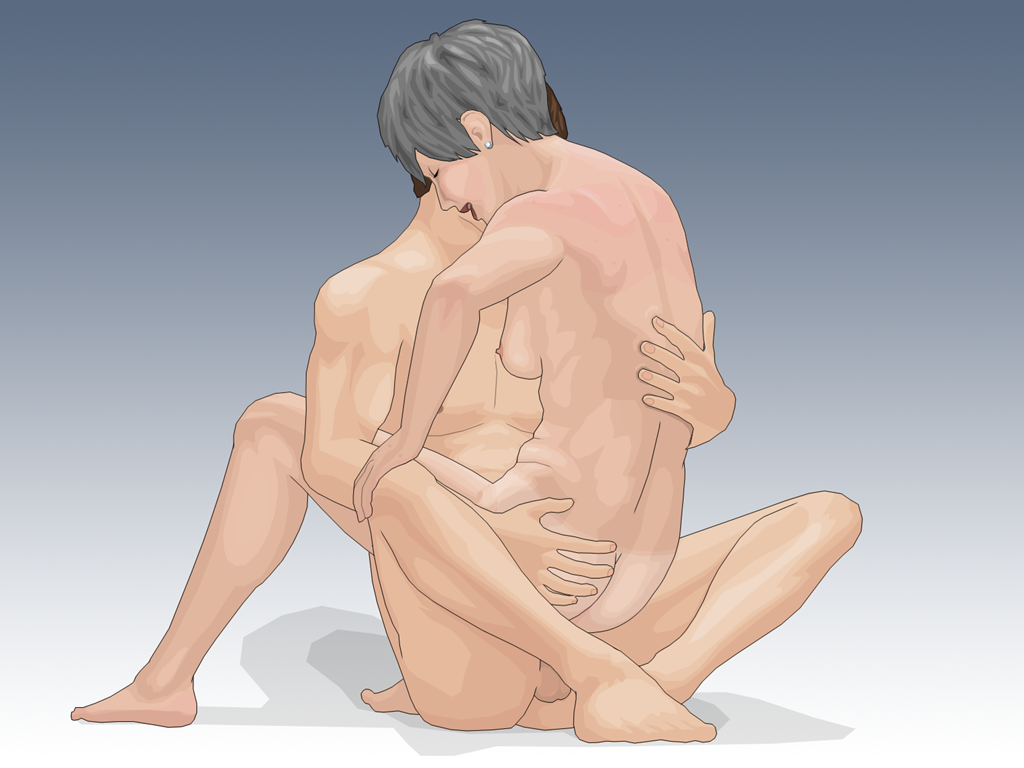
A couple performing sexual intercourse from a seated position, called the lotus position or lotus flower

Most of these positions can be used for either vaginal or anal penetration.

- The penetrating partner sits on an area surface, legs outstretched. The receiving partner sits on top and wraps their legs around the penetrating partner. Called pounding on the spot in the Burton translation of The Perfumed Garden. If the penetrating partner sits cross-legged, it is called the lotus position or lotus flower. The receiving partner may also sit in reverse, with their back to the penetrating partner. The position can be combined with fondling of erogenous zones.
- The penetrating partner sits in a chair. The receiving partner straddles penetrating partner and sits, facing the penetrating partner, feet on floor. This is sometimes called a lap dance, which is somewhat erroneous as a lap dance typically does not involve penetration. The receiving partner may also sit in reverse, with their back to the penetrating partner.
- The penetrating partner sits on a couch or in a chair that has armrests. The receiving partner sits in the penetrating partner's lap, perpendicular to penetrating partner, with their back against the armrest.
- The penetrating partner kneels while the receiving partner lies on their back, ankles on each side of penetrating partner's shoulders.

=== Standing ===
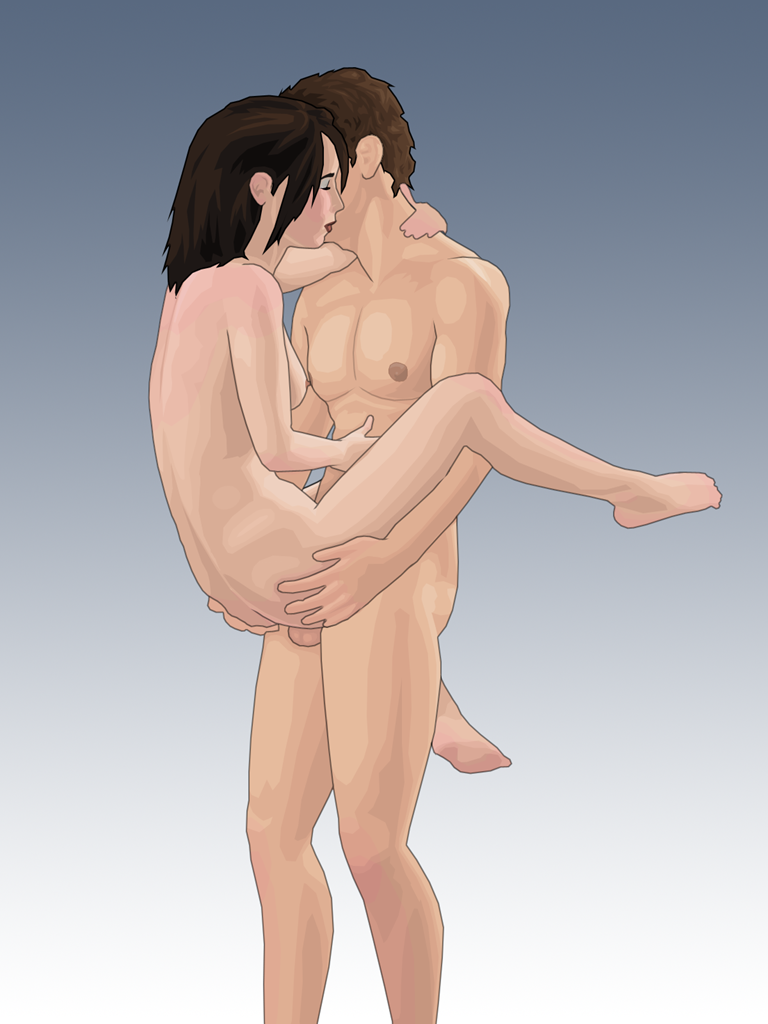
One partner stands while holding up the other without a support, called the Suspended Congress in the Kama Sutra and Ekiben in Japanese

Most of these positions can be used for either vaginal or anal penetration. In the basic standing position, both partners stand facing each other. The following variations are possible:

- In the basic standing position, both partners stand facing each other and engage in vaginal sex. In order to match heights, the shorter partner can, for instance, stand on a stair or wear high heels. It may be easier to maintain solid thrusts if the woman has her back to a wall. With such a support, the Kama Sutra calls this position the Suspended Congress. This position is most often used in upright places, such as a wall in a bedroom or a shower.
- The penetrating partner stands, and the receiving partner wraps their arms around his neck, and their legs around his waist, thereby exposing either the vagina or anus to the man's penis. This position is made easier with the use of a solid object behind the receiver, as above. To assume this position, it can be easier to start with the receiving partner laying on their back on the edge of a bed; the penetrating partner puts his elbows under their knees, enters them, and then lifts them as he rises to a standing position. In Japan, this is colloquially called the Ekiben position, after a specific bento lunch box sold at train stations.
- Alternatively, the receiving partner can face away from the penetrating partner which allows for anal sex. This position is varied by having the receiving partner assume different semi-standing positions. For instance, they may bend at the waist, resting their hands or elbows on a table.

=== Anal sex positions ===
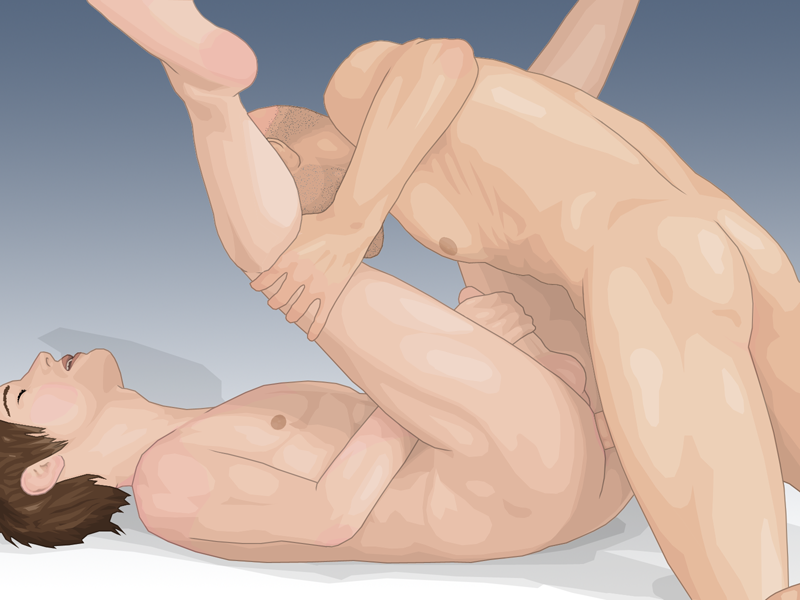
Anal sex between two men in the missionary position

Various positions can involve anal penetration:

- Doggy style penetration maximizes the depth of penetration, but can pose the risk of pushing against the sigmoid colon. If the receiving partner is male, this increases the chances of stimulating the prostate. The penetrating partner controls the thrusting rhythm. A variation is the leapfrog position, in which the receiving partner angles their torso downward. The receiving partner may also lie flat and face down, with the penetrating partner straddling their thighs.
- In the missionary positions, to achieve optimal alignment, the receiving partner's legs should be in the air with the knees drawn towards their chest. Some sort of support (such as a pillow) under the receiving partner's hips can also be useful. The penetrating partner positions themselves between the receiving partner's legs. The penetrating partner controls the thrusting rhythm. This position is often cited as good for beginners, because it allows them to relax more fully than is usual in the doggy style position.
- The spoons position allows the receiving partner to control initial penetration and the depth, speed and force of subsequent thrusting.
- The receiving partner on top positions allow the receiving partner more control over the depth, rhythm and speed of penetration. More specifically, the receiving partner can slowly push their anus down on the penetrating partner, allowing time for their muscles to relax.

=== Less common positions ===
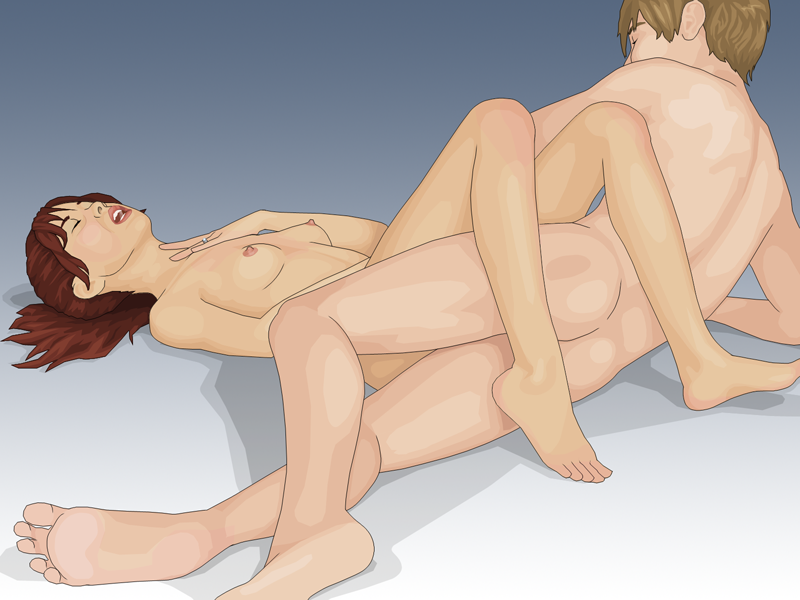
The T-square position

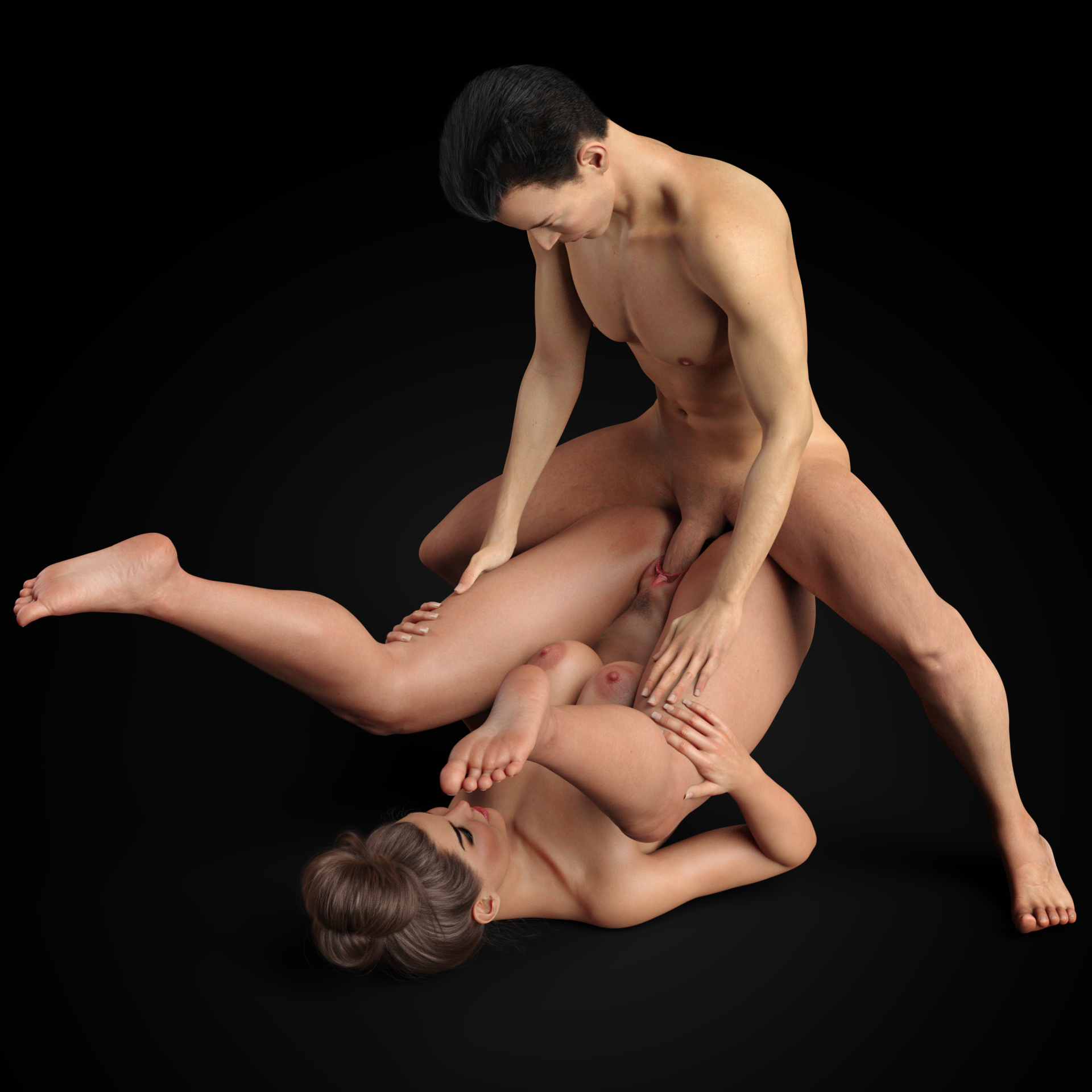
A man and a woman having sex in the piledriver position

These positions are more innovative, and perhaps not as widely known or practiced as the ones listed above.

- The receiving partner lies on their back with knees up and legs apart. The penetrating partner lies on their side perpendicular to the receiver, with the penetrating partner's hips under the arch formed by receiver's legs. This position is sometimes called the T-square.
- The receiving partner's legs are together turning to one side while looking up towards the penetrator, who has spread legs and is kneeling straight behind the other's hips. The penetrator's hands are on the other's hips. This position can be called the modified T-square.
- The Seventh Posture of Burton's translation of The Perfumed Garden is an unusual position not described in other classical sex manuals. The receiving partner lies on their side. The penetrating partner faces the receiver, straddling the receiver's lower leg, and lifts the receiver's upper leg on either side of the body onto the crook of penetrating partner's elbow or onto the shoulder. While some references describe this position as being "for acrobats and not to be taken seriously", others have found it very comfortable, especially during pregnancy.
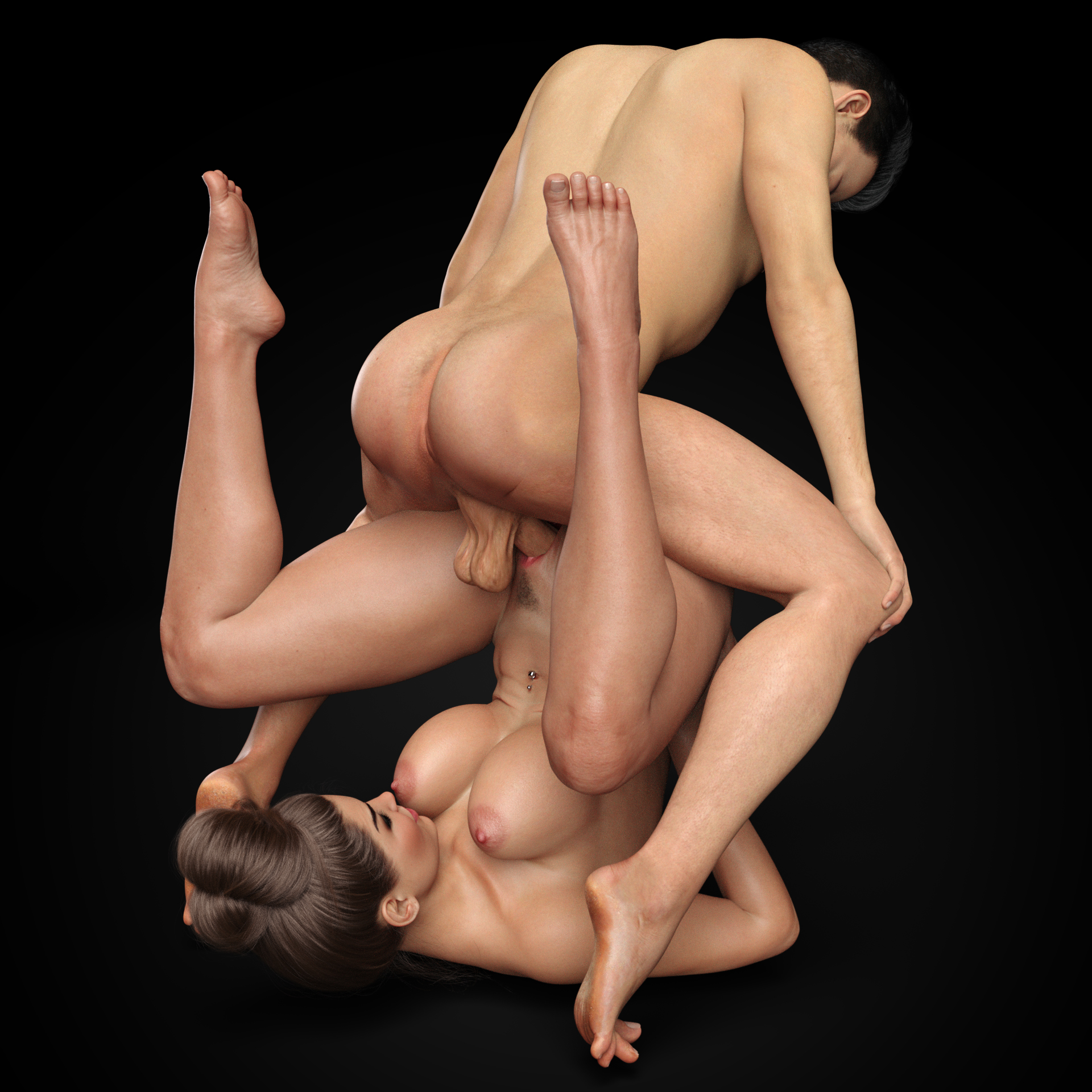
- A man and a woman having sex in the reverse piledriver position
  The piledriver is a difficult position sometimes seen in porn videos. It is described in many ways by different sources. In a heterosexual context, the woman lies on her back, then raises her hips as high as possible, so that her partner, standing, can enter her vaginally or anally. The position places considerable strain on the woman's neck, so firm cushions should be used to support her.
- The receiver lies face down legs spread on the edge of the bed and parallel to the floor, while the penetrator stands behind, holding both legs.
- The rusty bike pump is similar to a piledriver where penetration is achieved from above at a downward angle with the receiving partner bottom side up.

==== Others ====
- The receiving partner is on the bottom. The penetrating partner lies on top perpendicularly to them.
- The penetrating partner lies on their back, legs spread. The receiving partner is on their back on top of the penetrator, legs spread, facing the opposite direction.
- The penetrator and the receiver lie on their backs, heads pointed away from one another. Each places one leg on the other's shoulder (as a brace) and the other leg out somewhat to the side.
- The receiving partner lies on their back with the penetrating partner lying perpendicular. The receiving partner bends the knee closest to the penetrating partner's head enough so that there is room for the penetrating partner's waist to fit beneath it, while the penetrating partner's legs straddle the receiving partner's other leg. The in-and-out thrusting action will move more along a side-to-side rather than top-to-bottom axis. This position allows for breast stimulation during sex, for partners to maintain eye contact if they wish, and for a good view of both partners as they reach orgasm.
- The penetrating partner sits on edge of a bed or chair with feet spread wide on floor. The receiving partner lies on their back on the floor and drapes their legs and thighs over the legs of the penetrating partner. The penetrating partner holds the knees of the receiving partner and controls thrusts.

=== Using furniture or special apparatus ===
Most sex acts are typically performed on a bed or other simple platform. As the range of supports available increases, so does the range of positions that are possible. Ordinary furniture can be used for this purpose. Also, various forms of erotic furniture and other apparatus such as fisting slings and trapezes have been used to facilitate even more exotic sexual positions.

=== Positions to promote or prevent conception ===
Pregnancy is a potential result of any form of sexual activity where sperm comes in contact with the vagina; this is typically during vaginal sex, but pregnancy can result from anal sex, digital sex (fingering), oral sex, or by another body part, if sperm is transferred from one area to the vagina between a fertile female and a fertile male. Men and women typically reach fertility during puberty. Though certain sexual positions are believed to produce more favorable results than others, none of these are effective means of contraception.

=== Positions during pregnancy ===
The goal is to prevent excessive pressure on the belly and to restrict penetration as required by the particular partners. Some of the positions below are popular positions for sex during pregnancy.

- Woman on top: takes the pressure off the woman's abdomen and allows her to control the depth and frequency of thrusting.
- Woman on back: like the missionary, but with less pressure on abdomen or uterus. The woman lies on her back and raises her knees up towards her chest. The partner kneels between her legs and enters from the front. A pillow is placed under her bottom for added comfort.
- Sideways: also keeps pressure off her abdomen while supporting her uterus at the same time.
- Spooning: very popular positions to use during the late stages of pregnancy; allowing only shallow penetration and relieves the pressure on the abdomen.
- Sitting: she mounts the sitting partner, relieving her abdomen of pressure.
- From behind: allowing her to support abdomen and breasts.

== Non-exclusively penetrative ==
=== Oral sex positions ===
Oral sex is genital stimulation by the mouth. It may be penetrative or non-penetrative, and may take place before, during, or following intercourse. It may also be performed simultaneously (for example, when one partner performs cunnilingus, while the other partner performs fellatio), or only one partner may perform upon the other; this creates a multitude of variations.

==== Fellatio ====
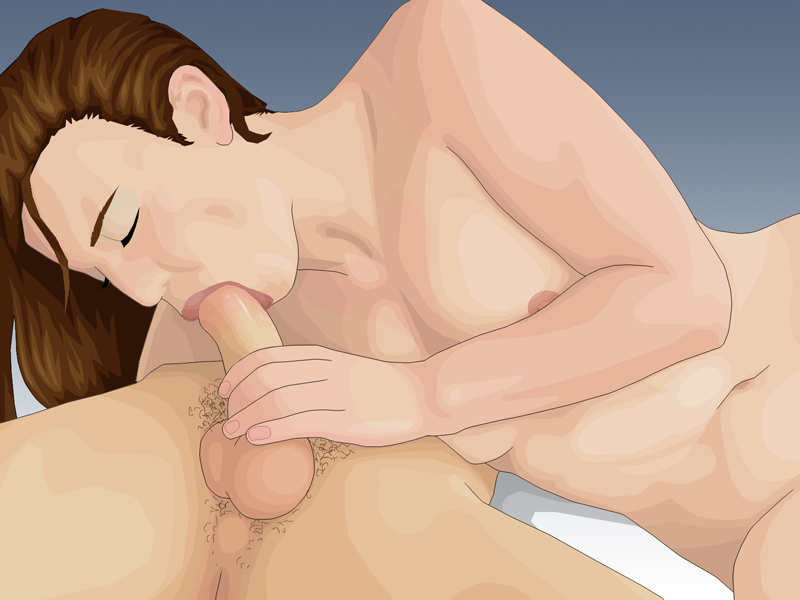
Modern drawing of fellatio

Fellatio is oral sex performed on the penis. Possible positions include:

- Sitting
  - The receiver lies on their back while the partner kneels between the receiver's legs.
  - The receiver lies on their back while the partner lies off to the side of their legs.
  - The receiver sits in a chair, the partner kneels in front of them between their legs.
- Standing
  - The receiver stands while the partner either kneels in front of them or sits (in a chair or on the edge of a bed, etc.) and bends forward.
  - The receiver stands while the partner, also standing, bends forward at the waist.
  - The receiver stands or crouches at the edge of the bed, facing the bed. The active partner lies on the bed with their head hanging over the edge of the bed backward. The receiver inserts their penis into the partner's mouth, usually to achieve deep throat penetration.
- Lying
  - While the active partner lies on their back, the receiver assumes the missionary position but adjusted forward.
  - The active partner (with breasts) lies on their back, and the receiver inserts their penis between the breasts, and into the mouth.

==== Cunnilingus ====
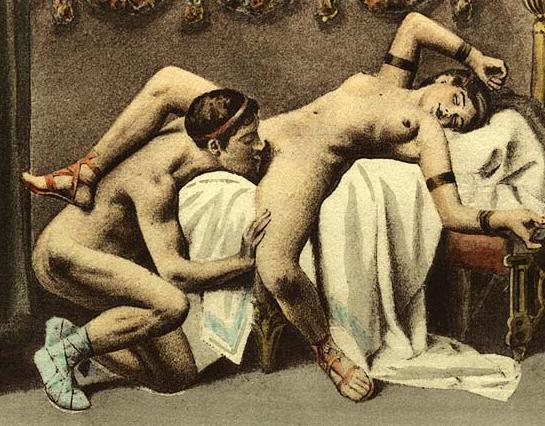
19th-century depiction of cunnilingus (detail) by Paul Avril

Cunnilingus is oral sex performed on the vulva. Possible positions include:

- The receiver lies on her back as in the missionary position. The active partner lies on their front between their legs.
- The active partner sits. The receiver stands facing away and bends at the hips.
- The active partner sits. The receiver stands or squats facing towards partner and may arch their back, to create further stimulation.
- The active partner lies on their back while the receiver kneels with their legs at their sides and their vulva on their mouth. In other words, the receiver sits on the partner's face.
- The receiver rests on all fours as in the doggy style position. The partner lies on their back with their head under their vulva. Their feet may commonly extend off the bed and rest on the floor.
- The receiver stands, possibly bracing themself against a wall. The active partner kneels in front of them.
- The receiver sits on the bed with their legs open, the active partner kneels in front of them.
- The receiver is upside-down (standing on hands, held by partner, or using support, such as bondage or furniture), with the active partner standing or kneeling (depending on elevation) in front or behind. Such a position may be difficult to achieve, or maintain for extended time periods, but the rush of blood to the brain can alter stimulation's effect.
- The receiver stands on hands, resting each leg on either side of the active partner's head, with the active partner standing or kneeling facing them. Depending on which way up the receiver is facing, different stimulation and levels of comfort may be available.

==== Sixty-nine ====
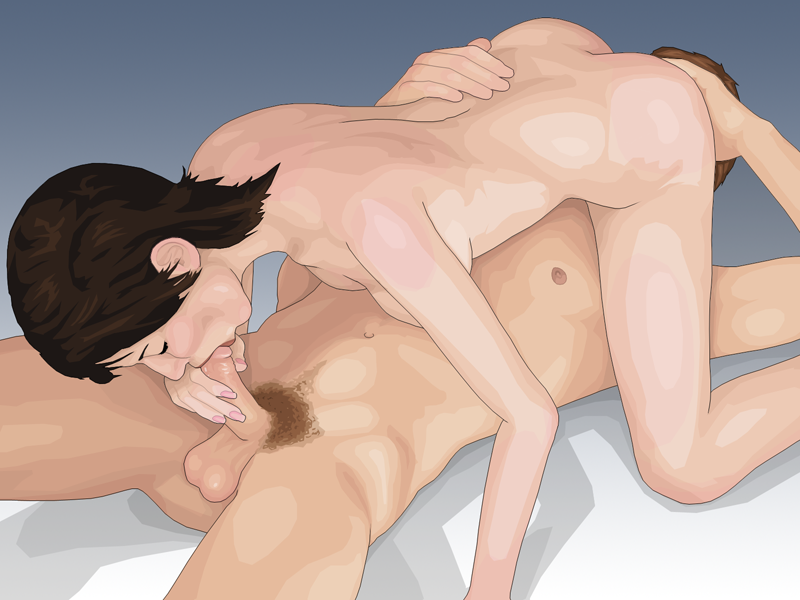
The 69 position

Simultaneous oral sex between two people is called 69. They can lie side-by-side, lie one on top of the other, or stand with one partner holding the other upside down.

==== Anilingus ====
Woman performing anilingus on another woman

Anilingus is oral sex performed on the anus. Positions for anilingus are often variants on those for genital-oral sex. Possible positions include:

- The passive partner is on all fours in the doggy position with the active partner behind.
- The passive partner is on their back in the missionary position with their legs up.
- The passive partner on top in the 69 position.
- The rusty trombone, in which a male stands while the active partner performs both anilingus from behind, generally from a kneeling position, and also manually stimulates the standing partner's penis, thus somewhat resembling someone playing the trombone.

=== Other positions ===
- Fingering of the vulva, vagina or anus.
- Fisting: inserting the entire hand into the vagina or rectum.

== Non-penetrative ==
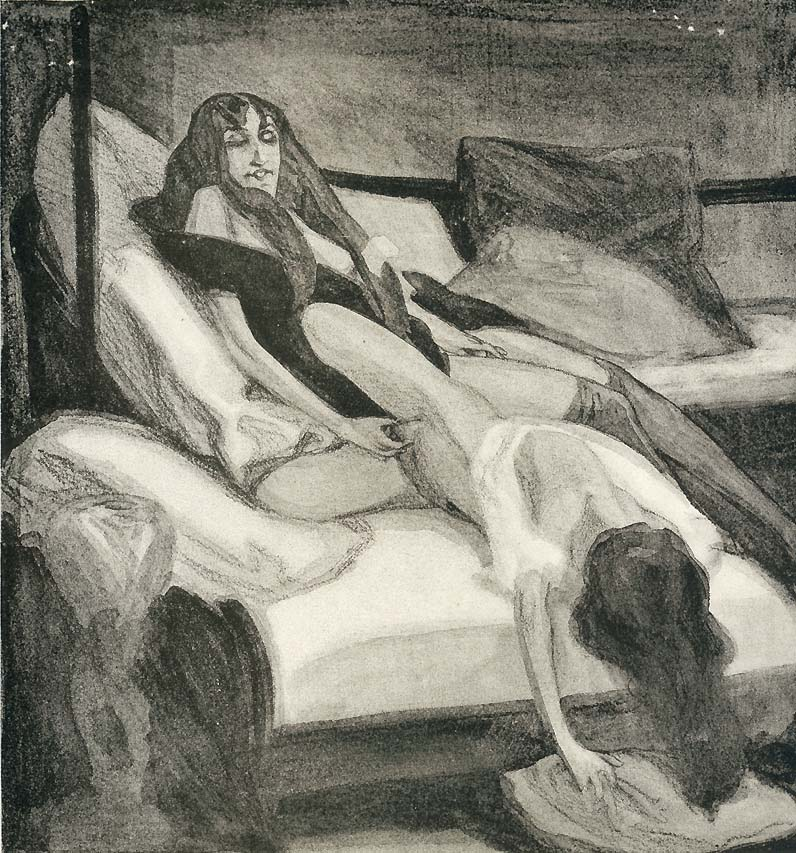
Drawing by Franz von Bayros showing an act of fingering

Non-penetrative sex or frottage generally refers to a sexual activity that excludes penetration, and often includes rubbing one's genitals on one's sexual partner. This may include the partner's genitals or buttocks, and can involve different sex positions. As part of foreplay or to avoid penetrative sex, people engage in a variety of non-penetrative sexual behavior, which may or may not lead to orgasm.

- Dry humping: frottage while clothed. This act is common, although not essential, in the dance style known as "grinding".
- Handjob: manual stimulation of a partner's penis.
- Fingering: manual stimulation of a partner's vulva.
- Footjob: using the feet to stimulate the genitals.
- Mammary intercourse: using the breasts together to stimulate the penis through the cleavage.
- Axillary intercourse: with the penis in the armpit. Commonly known as "bagpiping".
- Orgasm control: By self or by a partner managing the physical stimulation and sensation connected with the emotional and physiologic excitement levels. Through the practice of masturbation, an individual can learn to develop control of their own body's orgasmic response and timing. In partnered stimulation, either partner can control their own orgasmic response and timing. With mutual agreement, either partner can similarly learn to control or enhance their partner's orgasmic response and timing. Partnered stimulation orgasm techniques referred to as expanded orgasm, extended orgasm or orgasm control can be learned and practiced for either partner to refine their control of the orgasmic response of the other. Partners mutually choose which is in control or in response to the other.

The slang term humping may refer to masturbation—thrusting one's genitals against the surface of non-sexual objects, clothed or unclothed; or it may refer to penetrative sex.

=== Genital–genital rubbing ===
Genital–genital rubbing (often termed GG rubbing by primatologists to describe the ubiquitous behavior among female bonobos) is the sexual act of mutually rubbing genitals; it is commonly grouped with frottage, as well as other terms, such as non-penetrative sex or outercourse:

- Intercrural sex or interfemoral sex: the penis is placed between the partner's thighs, perhaps rubbing the vulva, scrotum or perineum.
- Frot: two males mutually rubbing penises together.
- Tribadism: two females mutually rubbing vulvae together.
- Docking: inserting the glans penis into the foreskin of another penis.

== Group sex ==
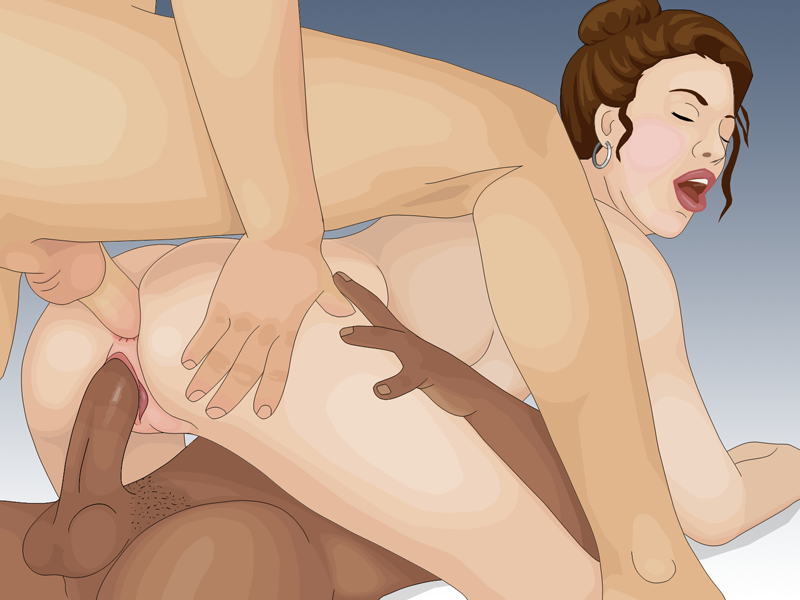
Double penetration

People may participate in group sex. While group sex does not imply that all participants must be in sexual contact with all others simultaneously, some positions are only possible with three or more people.

As with the positions listed above, more group sex positions become practical if erotic furniture is used.

=== Threesomes ===
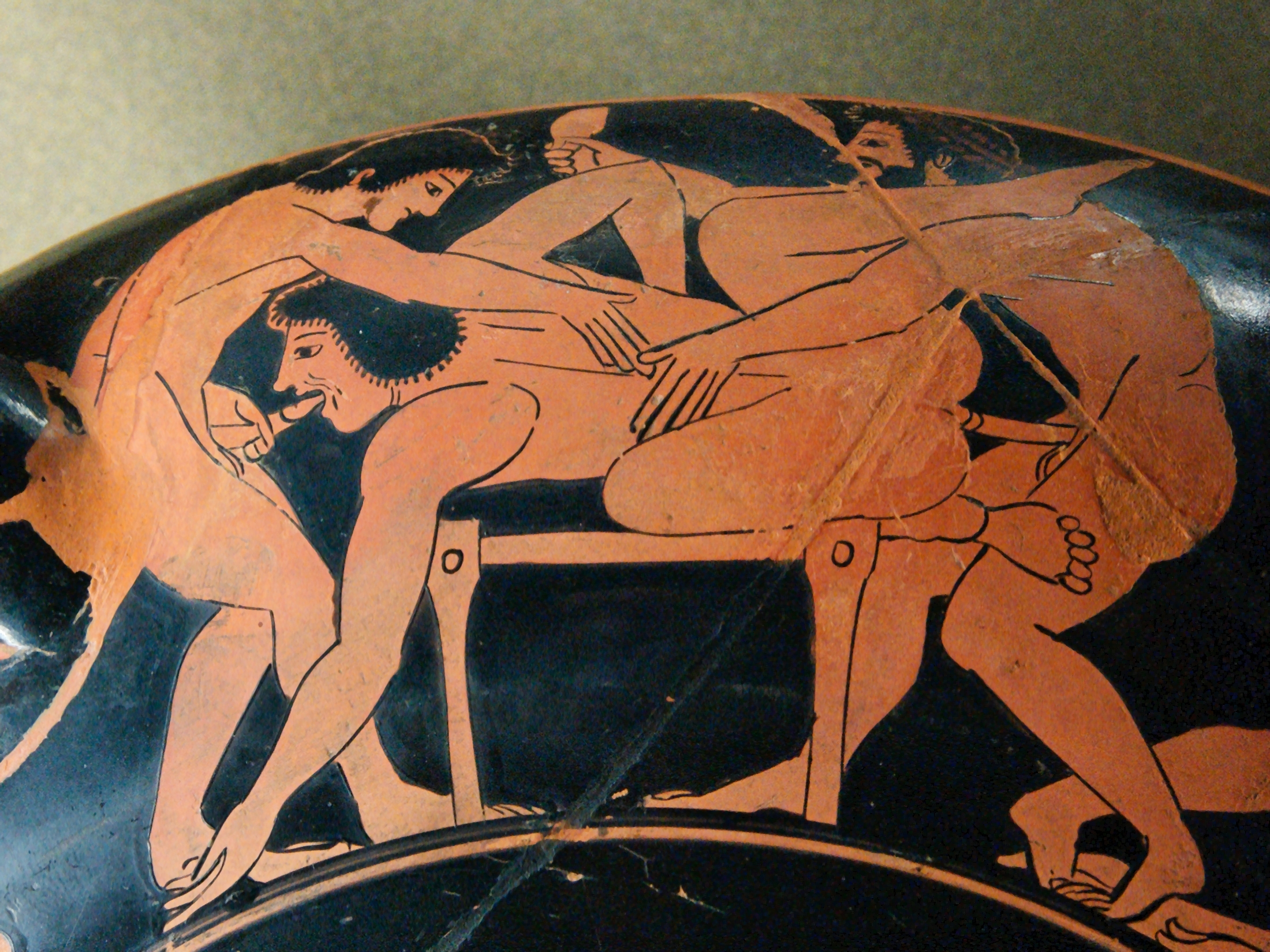
Threesome in Ancient Greece

When three people have sex with each other, it is called a threesome. Possible ways of having all partners in sexual contact with each include some of the following:

- One person performs oral sex on one partner while they engage in receptive anal or vaginal intercourse with the other partner. Sometimes called a spit roast.
- The 369 position is where two people engage in oral sex in the 69 position while a third person positions himself to penetrate one of the others; usually a man engaging in sex doggie-style with the woman on top in the 69 position.
- A man has vaginal or anal sex with one partner, while himself being anally penetrated by another (possibly with a strap-on dildo).
- Two participants engage in cowgirl position, a third straddles man's face allowing him to go down on them. Generally called a double cowgirl.
- Three partners lie or stand in parallel, with one between the other two. Sometimes called a sandwich. This term may specifically refer to the double penetration of a woman, with one penis in her anus, and the other in her vagina or of a male, with two penises in his anus.
- Two participants have vaginal/anal sex with each other, and one/both perform oral sex on a third.
- Three people perform oral/vaginal/anal sex on one another simultaneously, commonly called a daisy chain.
- The slang term lucky Pierre is sometimes used in reference to the person playing the middle role in a threesome, being anally penetrated while engaging in penetrative anal or vaginal sex.

=== Foursomes ===
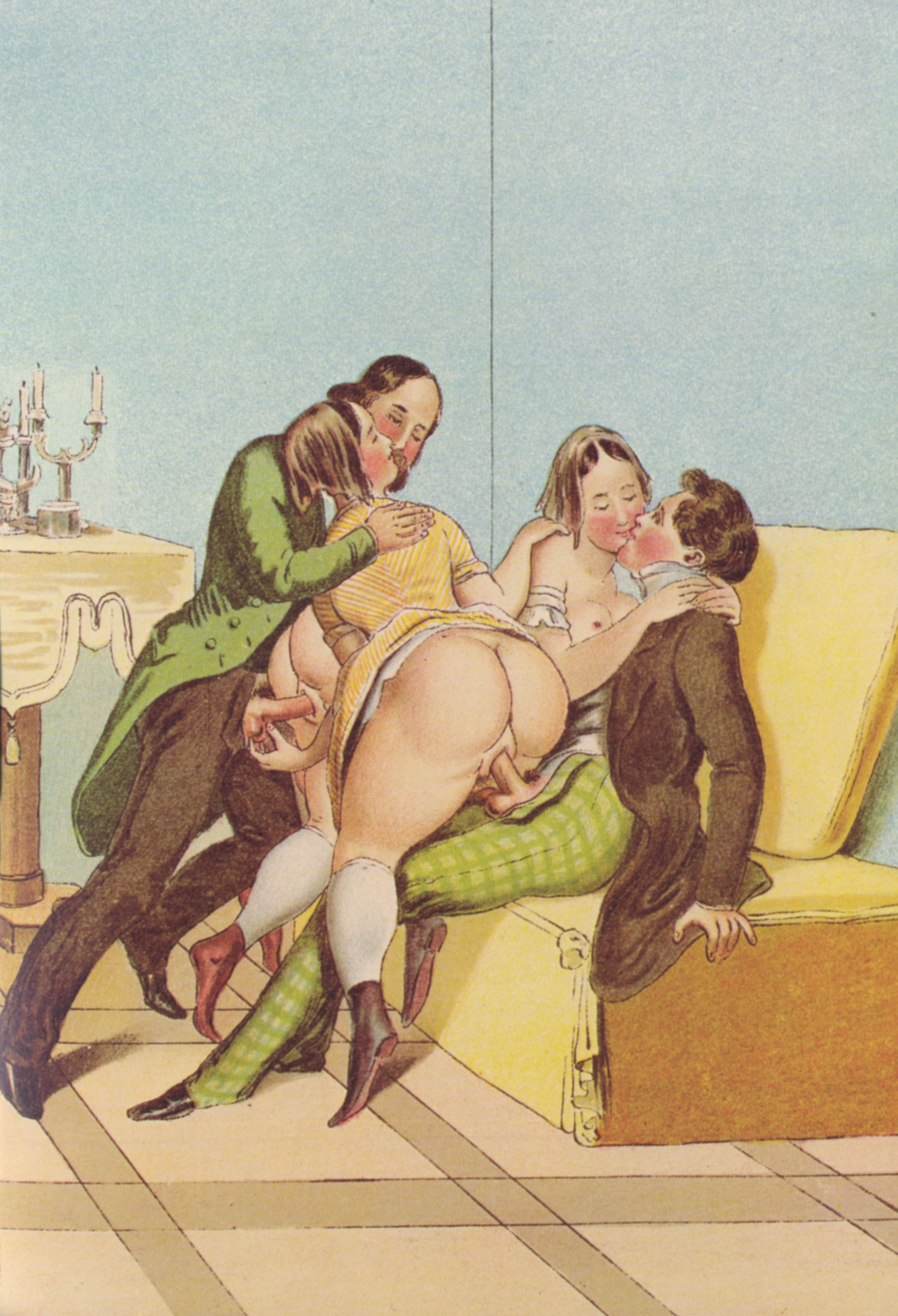
- Drawn by Peter Fendi showing an act of foursome
  A 469 is a four-person sexual position where two individuals engage in 69 oral sex while a third and a fourth person both position themselves on each end to penetrate the two engaged in simultaneous oral sex; similar to a 369, with the addition of a fourth person.

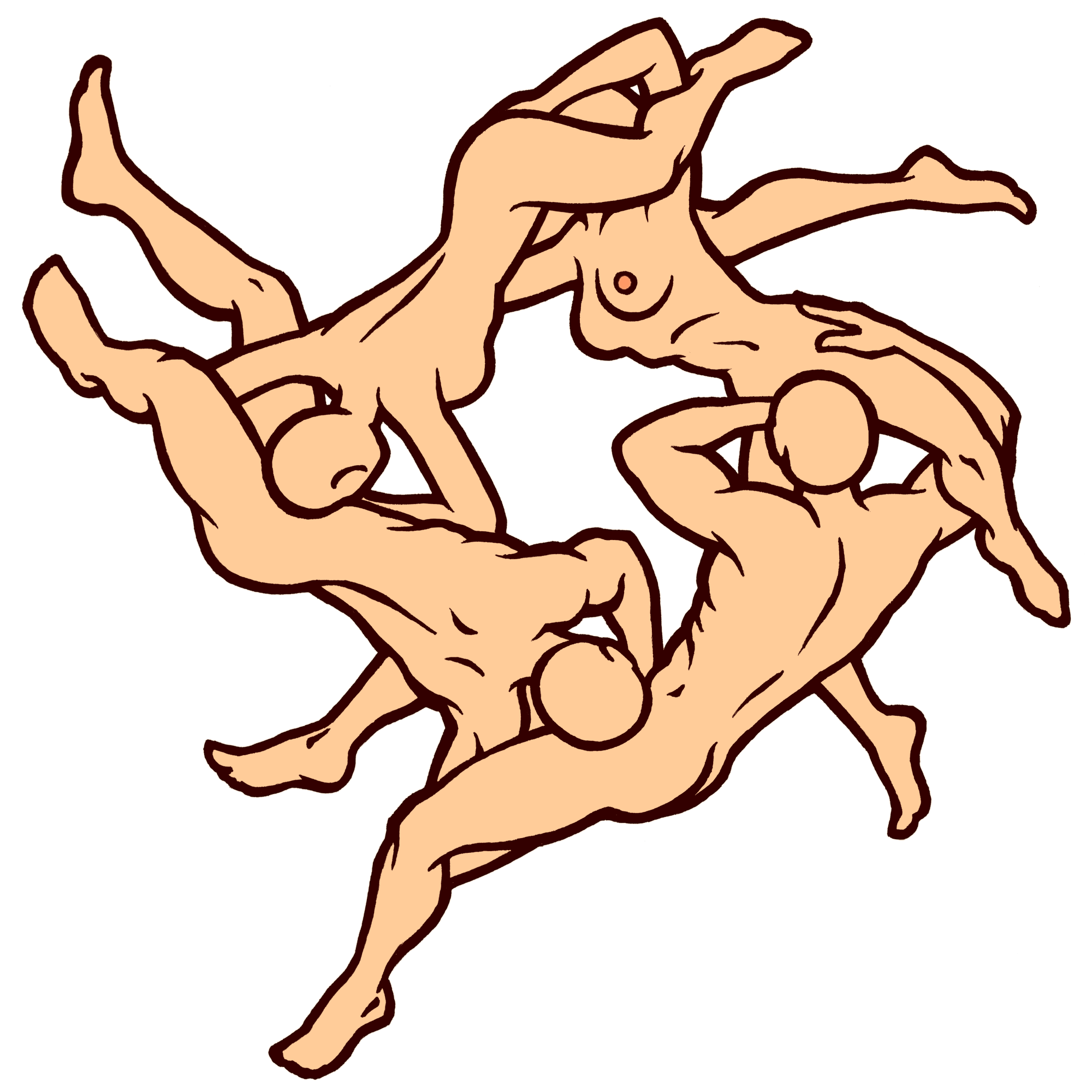
Two men and two women ringed in a circular foursome sex position performing four combinations of oral sex: M–F, F–F, F–M, M–M

=== With many participants ===
These positions can be expanded to accommodate any number of participants:

- A group of males masturbating is called a circle jerk.
- Sexual intercourse involving multiple women in which one man is the central focus is known as reverse gangbang.
- A group of males masturbating and ejaculating on one person's face is known as bukkake.
- A group of men, women, or both, each performing oral sex upon each other, in a circular arrangement, is a daisy chain.
- When one woman or man is given the serial or parallel attention of many, often involving a queue (pulling a train), it is often termed a gang bang.

=== Multiple penetration ===
A person may be sexually penetrated multiple times simultaneously. Penetration may involve use of fingers, toes, sex toys, or penises. Scenes of multiple penetration are common in pornography.

If one person is penetrated by two objects, it is generically called double penetration (DP). Double penetration of the vagina, anus, or mouth can involve:

- Simultaneous penetration of the anus by two penises or other objects. This is commonly called double anal penetration (DAP).
- Simultaneous penetration of the vagina by two penises or other objects. This is commonly called double vaginal penetration (DVP) or double stuffing.
- Simultaneous penetration of the vagina and anus. The shocker accomplishes this using several fingers of one hand.
- Simultaneous penetration of the mouth and either the vagina or anus. If the penetrating objects are penises, this is sometimes called the spit roast, the Chinese finger trap, or the Eiffel tower.

== Cultural differences and preferences ==
Sexual practices vary between cultures. Latin American couples that recorded their sexual activities do not practice the missionary position as much as couples from United States reported. The duration of sexual intercourse seems to be similar amongst European and Latin American couples.

== See also ==
- Bondage positions and methods
