= Cum shot =

Depiction of human ejaculation

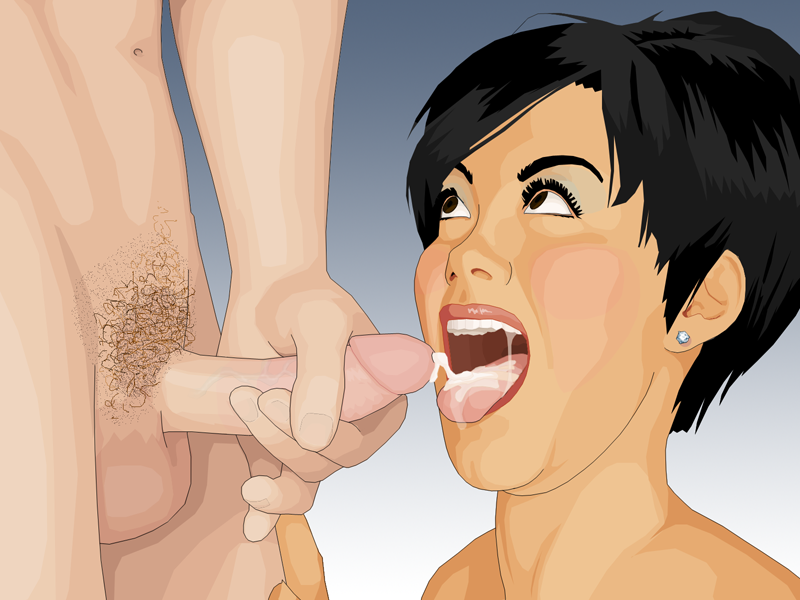
An illustration by Seedfeeder of an oral cum shot, in which a man ejaculates onto a woman's tongue

A cum shot is the depiction of human ejaculation, especially onto another person. The term is usually applied to depictions occurring in pornographic films, photographs, and magazines. Unlike ejaculation in non-pornographic sex, cum shots typically involve ejaculation outside the receiver's body, allowing the viewer to see the ejaculation in progress. Facial cum shots (or "facials") are regularly portrayed in pornographic films and videos, often as a way to close a scene. Cum shots may also depict ejaculation onto another part of the body, such as on the genitals, buttocks, chest or tongue.

The term is typically used by the cinematographer within the narrative framework of a pornographic film, and, since the 1970s, it has become a leitmotif of the hardcore genre. Two exceptions are softcore pornography, in which penetration is not explicitly shown, and "couples erotica", which may involve penetration but is typically filmed in a more discreet manner intended to be romantic or educational rather than graphic. Softcore pornography that does not contain ejaculation sequences is produced both to respond to a demand by some consumers for less-explicit pornographic material and to comply with government regulations or cable company rules that may disallow depictions of ejaculation. Cum shots typically do not appear in "girl–girl" scenes (female ejaculation scenes exist but are relatively uncommon); orgasm is instead implied by utterances, cinematic conventions, or body movement.

Cum shots have become the object of fetish genres like bukkake, in which the cum shot replaces the sex act completely.

== Terminology ==
A cum shot may also be called a cumshot, come shot, cum blast, pop shot or money shot.

Originally, in general film-making usage the term money shot was a reference to the scene that cost the most money to produce; in addition, the inclusion of this expensive special effect sequence is being counted on to become a selling point for the film. For example, in an action thriller, an expensive special effects sequence of an explosion might be called the "money shot" of the film. The use of money shot to denote the ejaculation scene in pornographic films is attributed to producers paying the male actors extra for it. The meaning of the term money shot has sometimes been borrowed back from pornography by the film and TV industry with a meaning closer to that used in pornographic films. For example, in TV talk shows, the term, borrowed from pornography, denotes a highly emotional scene, expressed in visible bodily terms.

== Origin and features ==
Ejaculation onto a woman's upper chest after mammary intercourse, also called a “pearl necklace”

Although earlier pornographic films occasionally contained footage of ejaculation, it was not until the advent of hardcore pornography in the 1970s that the stereotypical cum shot scene became a standard feature— displaying ejaculation with maximum visibility. The 1972 film Behind the Green Door featured a seven-minute-long sequence described by Linda Williams, professor of film studies, as "optically printed, psychedelically colored doublings of the ejaculating penis". Steven Ziplow's The Film Maker's Guide to Pornography (1977) states:

There are those who believe that the come shot, or, as some refer to it, the "money shot," is the most important element in the movie and that everything else (if necessary) should be sacrificed at its expense. Of course, this depends on the outlook of the producer, but the one thing is for sure: if you don't have the come shots, you don't have a porno picture.

Cum shot scenes may involve the female actor calling for the shot to be directed at some specific part of her body. Cultural analysis researcher Murat Aydemir considers this one of the three quintessential aspects of the cum shot scene, alongside the emphasis on visible ejaculation and the timing of the cum shot, which usually concludes a hardcore scene.

As a possible alternative explanation for the rise of the cum shot in hardcore pornography, Joseph Slade, professor at Ohio University and author of Pornography and sexual representation: a reference guide notes that pornography actresses in the 1960s and 1970s did not trust birth control methods, and that more than one actress of the period told him that ejaculation inside her body was deemed inconsiderate if not rude.

== Health risks ==
=== Transmission of disease ===
Any sexual activity that involves contact with the bodily fluids of another person contains the risk of transmission of sexually transmitted diseases. Semen is in itself generally harmless on the skin or if swallowed. However, semen can be the vehicle for many sexually transmitted infections, such as HIV and hepatitis. The California Occupational Safety and Health Administration categorizes semen as "other potentially infectious material" or OPIM.

Aside from other sexual activity that may have occurred prior to performing a facial, the risks incurred by the giving and receiving partner are drastically different. For the ejaculating partner, there is almost no risk of contracting an STD. For the receiving partner, the risk is higher. Since potentially infected semen could come into contact with broken skin or sensitive mucous membranes (e.g., eyes, lips, mouth), there is a risk of contracting an infectious disease.

=== Allergic reactions ===
In rare cases, people have been known to experience allergic reactions to seminal fluids, known as human seminal plasma hypersensitivity. Symptoms can be either localized or systemic, and may include itching, redness, swelling, or blisters within 30 minutes of contact. They may also include hives and even difficulty breathing.

Options for prevention of semen allergy include avoiding exposure to seminal fluid by use of condoms and attempting desensitization. Treatment options include diphenhydramine and/or an injection of epinephrine.

== Criticisms and responses ==
One critic of "cum shot" scenes in heterosexual pornography was the US porn star–turned–writer, director and producer Candida Royalle. She produced pornography films aimed at women and their partners that avoid the "misogynous predictability" and depiction of sex in "[...] as grotesque and graphic [a way] as possible." Royalle also criticizes the male-centredness of the typical pornography film, in which scenes end when the male actor ejaculates.

Women's activist Beatrice Faust argued, "since ejaculating into blank space is not much fun, ejaculating over a person who responds with enjoyment sustains a lighthearted mood as well as a degree of realism. This occurs in both homosexual and hetrosexual [sic] pornography so that ejaculation cannot be interpreted as an expression of contempt for women only." She goes on to say "Logically, if sex is natural and wholesome and semen is as healthy as sweat, there is no reason to interpret ejaculation as a hostile gesture."

Sexologist Peter Sándor Gardos argues that his research suggests that "[...] the men who get most turned on by watching cum shots are the ones who have positive attitudes toward women" (at the annual meeting of the Society for the Scientific Study of Sex in 1992). Later, at the World Pornography Conference in 1998, he reported a similar conclusion, namely that "no pornographic image is interpretable outside of its historical and social context. Harm or degradation does not reside in the image itself."

Cindy Patton, activist and scholar on human sexuality, argues that, in Western culture, male sexual fulfillment is synonymous with orgasm and that the male orgasm is an essential punctuation of the sexual narrative. According to Patton, sexual pleasure is inseparable from orgasm. Without a cum shot, there is no narrative closure. She likens the cum shot to the period at the end of a sentence.

In her essay "Visualizing Safe Sex: When Pedagogy and Pornography Collide", Patton reached the conclusion that critics have devoted too little space to discovering the meaning that viewers attach to specific acts such as cum shots.

== See also ==
- Cum tribute
- Creampie (sexual act)
- Erotic humiliation
- Facial (sexual act)
- Fellatio
- Gokkun
- Oral sex
- Pearl necklace
- Salirophilia
- Sexual slang
- Snowballing
- Turkey slap
