= Facial (sexual act) =

Sexual activity involving ejaculating on the face of another

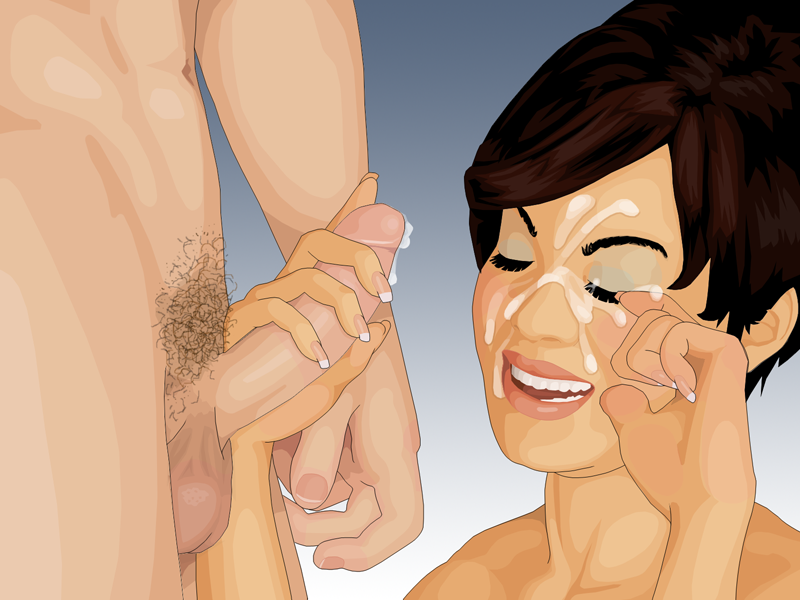
An illustration of a man ejaculating onto a woman's face

A facial is a sexual activity in which a man ejaculates semen onto the face of one or more sexual partners. A facial is a form of non-penetrative sex, though it is generally performed after some other means of sexual stimulation, such as vaginal sex, anal sex, oral sex, manual sex or masturbation. Facials are regularly portrayed in pornographic films and videos, often as a way to close a scene.

The performance of a facial is typically preceded by activities that result in the sexual arousal and stimulation of the ejaculating participant. After the prerequisite level of sexual stimulation has been achieved, and ejaculation becomes imminent, the male will position his penis in a way that allows the discharged semen to be deposited onto his partner's face.

== Cultural depictions ==
Predating the modern age of pornography, facials were described in literature. As an example, the French aristocrat Marquis de Sade wrote about performing facials in his work The 120 Days of Sodom, written in 1785. One passage of the novel reads "… I show them my prick, then what do you suppose I do? I squirt the fuck in their face… That's my passion my child, I have no other… and you're about to behold it."

=== In mainstream pornography ===
In the 1970s, the hardcore pornography genre introduced the stereotypical cumshot (also known as the money shot) scene as a central element of the hardcore film, in which the male actor ejaculates in a way ensuring maximum visibility of the act itself. These scenes may involve the female actor "calling for" the shot to be directed at some specific part of her body. Now facial cumshots are regularly portrayed in pornographic films, videos, magazines and internet web sites.

In addition to mainstream pornography, the popularity of facials has led to creation of its own niche market, like video series that specialize in showing the act. In 2010, psychologist Ana Bridges and colleagues conducted a content analysis of best-selling heterosexual pornographic videos showing that over 96% of all scenes concluded with a male performer ejaculating onto the body of his female partner. The mouth was the most common area to be ejaculated upon. When all regions of the face are included, facial cum shots occur in approximately 62% of scenes where external ejaculation occurs.

=== In feminist pornography ===
When feminist pornography emerged in 1980s, pioneer Candida Royalle always excluded facial cum shots, and with few exceptions all other male external ejaculations, from her sex scenes. Ms. Naughty's (since 2000) and Petra Joy's work (since 2004) has followed the same principle. In the early works of Tristan Taormino (starting in 1999), facials were also deliberately excluded, but after her thinking about feminist porn gradually changed, she sometimes included such acts in her later productions. Erika Lust has occasionally featured facials ever since her 2004 debut The Good Girl.

== Health risks ==
=== Pain in the eye ===
Getting semen in the eye can cause intense pain, sting and burn, because the semen contains components which irritate the ocular tissue. The reaction can be tearing, sensitivity to light, redness and blurry vision. The eye can be rinsed with clean water, the tears also help to flush out the semen, after which the discomfort will subside.

=== Transmission of disease ===
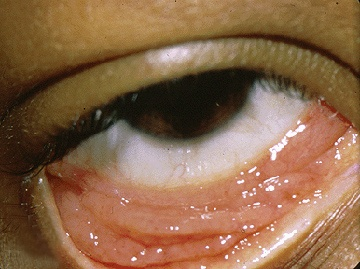
Eye infected with chlamydial conjunctivitis.

Any sexual activity that involves contact with the bodily fluids of another person contains the risk of transmission of sexually transmitted infections (STIs/STDs). Semen is in itself generally harmless on the skin or if swallowed, but not on the ocular tissue (Conjunctiva). However, semen can be the vehicle for many sexually transmitted infections, such as HIV and hepatitis. The California Occupational Safety and Health Administration categorizes semen as "other potentially infectious material" or OPIM.

If the man has chlamydia in his semen, the receiving partner may contract chlamydial conjunctivitis.

The risks incurred by the giving and receiving partner during the facial sexual act are drastically different. For the ejaculating partner there is almost no risk of contracting an STI. For the receiving partner, the risk is higher. Since potentially infected semen could come into contact with broken skin or sensitive mucous membranes (i.e., eyes, lips, mouth), there is a risk of contracting an infectious disease.

=== Allergic reactions ===
In rare cases, people have been known to experience allergic reactions to seminal fluids, known as human seminal plasma hypersensitivity. Symptoms can be either localized or systemic, and may include itching, redness, swelling, or blisters within 30 minutes of contact. They may also include hives and even difficulty breathing.

Treatment options for semen allergy include avoiding exposure to seminal fluid by use of condoms and attempting desensitization.

== Criticisms and responses ==
=== Criticisms ===
There are a variety of views ranging from facials being an act of degradation and elicit humiliation to being grounded in mutual respect and elicit pleasure. Feminist views of the depiction of male-on-female facials are primarily critical, even amongst some sex-positive feminists (including feminist pornographers), although other sex-positive feminists regard it as always acceptable, or only acceptable if certain conditions are met.

==== General ====
Sex therapist Ruth Westheimer believed facials are "humiliating and not sexy". She advised the average person contemplating oral sex to not think that a facial is a necessary part of the act. In response to an inquiry from a reader, sex columnist Dan Savage wrote: "Facials are degrading—and that's why they're so hot." Daily Nexus columnist Nina Love Anthony views the practice of facials in a non-threatening light, feeling that it adds variety to the sexual experience. In one of her weekly articles she wrote, "But let's give credit where credit is due: The money shot, by itself, is great for a number of reasons. Blowing it on someone's face is like a change-up pitch—if you've been throwing the heat for a while, maybe you should consider hooking the curve ball." She continues with, "Also, being on the receiving end of the shot can satisfy the secret porn star in everyone and it's minor kink for beginners."

==== Anti-porn feminists ====
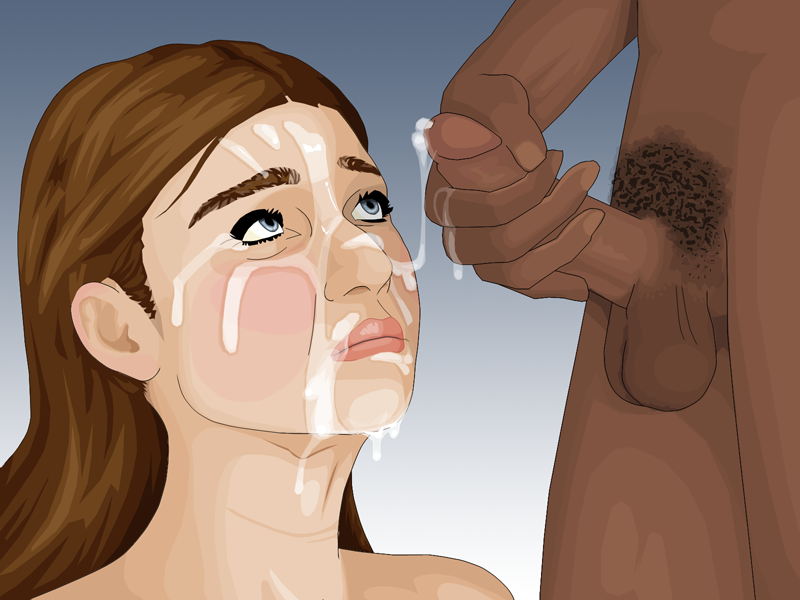
A woman receiving a facial

Sociologists Gail Dines, Robert Jensen and Russo echo these sentiments in the book Pornography: The Production and Consumption of Inequality. It asserts, "In pornography, ejaculating onto a woman is a primary method by which she is turned into a slut, something (not really someone) whose primary, if not only, purpose is to be sexual with men." Radical feminist and noted critic of pornography Andrea Dworkin said "it is a convention of pornography that the sperm is on her not in her. It marks the spot, what he owns and how he owns it. The ejaculation on her is a way of saying (through showing) that she is contaminated with his dirt; that she is dirty."

In Padraig McGrath's review of Laurence O'Toole's book Pornocopia – Porn, Sex, Technology and Desire, he rhetorically asks whether "…women enjoy having men ejaculate on their faces?" He suggests that the role of such a scene is to illustrate that "…it doesn't matter what the woman likes—she'll like whatever the man wants her to like because she has no inner life of her own, in turn because she's not a real person". McGrath argues that there is a "power-aspect" to depictions such as cum shots. He suggests that the "…central theme [of pornography] is power…[,] implicitly violent… eroticized hatred."

Gail Dines, writing in Pornland: How Porn Has Hijacked Our Sexuality, describes the money shot of a man ejaculating on the face or body of a woman as "one of the most degrading acts in porn". To Dines, the ejaculate on the female performer's body "marks the woman as used goods", conveying a sense of ownership, and she quotes veteran porn actor and producer Bill Margold as saying, "I'd like to really show what I believe the men want to see: violence against women. I firmly believe that we serve a purpose by showing that. The most violent we can get is the cum shot in the face. Men get off behind that because they get even with the women they can't have." She adds that at least for some posters on adult forums discussing such scenes, the pleasure is derived from watching a woman suffer. However, Dines also describes that "when you speak to pornographers, they tend themselves not to know" the origins of these sorts of things.

==== Feminist pornographers ====
"I liked porn but I really didn't like how most of it was marketed. (...) The scenes almost always ended with a facial "pop shot" and I didn't want to see that—I thought it was degrading and also kind of stupid. The woman would often kneel with a slightly pained expression on her face, trying to look adoringly up at a man while he squirted semen in her eye. The camera never showed the man's face during orgasm, which—to me–was a travesty. Men's faces are beautiful at that moment. (...) I wanted to change that. I wanted to make porn better."

— Ms. Naughty (2013)

Feminist pornographers disagree amongst themselves whether facials should be regarded as representing or having the effect of gender inequality, should therefore not be considered feminist and thus excluded from feminist pornography, or that such depictions can be feminist if many female viewers enjoy it, or depending on a number of factors such as consent, context, chemistry, and performer agency. It is widely recognised amongst sex-positive feminists that the fact that people see facials in porn can lead them to want to do it in real life with their partners as well, and that this could (but, according to some, does not necessarily have to) have a negative impact on real-life sexuality.

Pornography-actress-turned-filmmaker Candida Royalle was a critic of "cum shot" scenes in mainstream pornography. She produced pornographic films aimed at women and their partners that avoid the "misogynous predictability" and depiction of sex in "…as grotesque and graphic [a way] as possible." Royalle was also critical of the male-centredness of the typical pornography film, in which scenes end when the male actor ejaculates, and therefore decided to exclude all facial cum shots, and with few exceptions all other male external ejaculations, from her porn films.

Commenting on Erika Lust's work, feminist pornographer Petra Joy (2007) argued: 'Feminism is committed to equality of the sexes, so surely "feminist porn" should show women as equals to men rather than as subservient beings... If you want to show cum on a woman's face that's fine but don't call it feminist.' Lust (2007) retorted, mocking 'the Church of the Pure Feminist Porn Producers... declaring that certain sexual practices that me and other women across the world happen to like, are a sin.'

Separately, as some of her critics alleged, Tristan Taormino (2013) has admitted that she cannot control how certain portrayals such as facials may be received by some viewers, 'specifically that men's orgasms represent the apex of a scene (and of sex itself) and women's bodies are things to be used, controlled, and marked like territory'. When making her first film, Taormino 'embraced the notion that certain depictions were turn-offs to all women, like facial cum shots. But my thinking on this has changed over time. I believe viewers appreciate consent, context, chemistry, and performer agency more than the presence or absence of a specific act.'

=== Responses ===
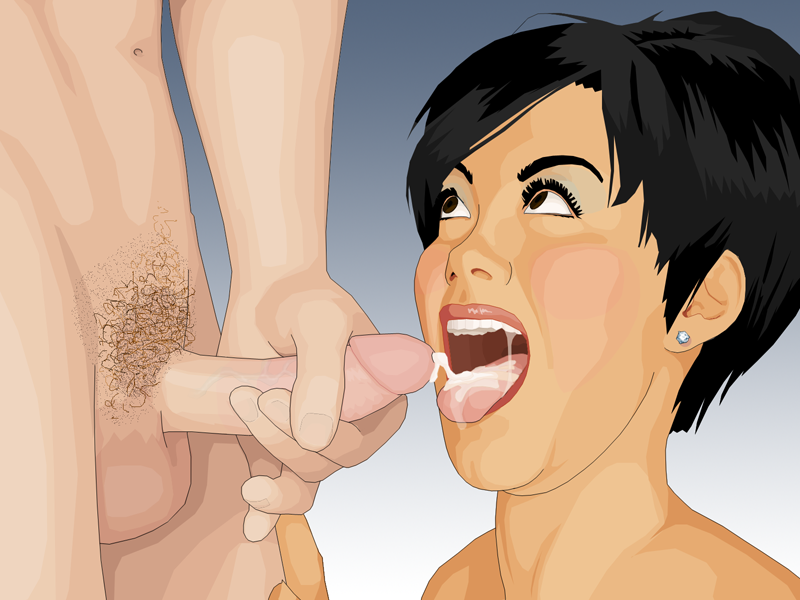
Illustration of an oral cum shot, in which a man ejaculates onto a woman's tongue

Sociologist Lisa Jean Moore suggests that Dworkin's explanation does not take into account that it is the pleasure the actresses exhibit that the male partners enjoy, and that it is more accurate to think men want their semen to be wanted. Correspondingly it is a porn industry standard for the actress to act eager and loving for the facial she receives, and not in displeasure. If displeasure was shown it was usually considered a failed shot.

Women's activist Beatrice Faust argued, "since ejaculating into blank space is not much fun, ejaculating over a person who responds with enjoyment sustains a lighthearted mood as well as a degree of realism." She goes on to say "Logically, if sex is natural and wholesome and semen is as healthy as sweat, there is no reason to interpret ejaculation as a hostile gesture." Joseph Slade, professor at Ohio University, notes in his book Pornography and sexual representation: a reference guide that adult industry actresses in the 1960s and 1970s did not trust birth control methods, and that more than one actress of the period told him that ejaculation inside her body was deemed inconsiderate if not rude.

Sexologist Peter Sándor Gardos argues that his research suggests that "… the men who get most turned on by watching cum shots are the ones who have positive attitudes toward women" (on the annual meeting of the Society for the Scientific Study of Sex in 1992). Later, on The World Pornography Conference in 1998, he reported a similar conclusion, namely that "no pornographic image is interpretable outside of its historical and social context. Harm or degradation does not reside in the image itself".

Cindy Patton, activist and scholar on human sexuality, claims that in western culture male sexual fulfillment is synonymous with orgasm and that the male orgasm is an essential punctuation of the sexual narrative. No orgasm, no sexual pleasure. No cum shot, no narrative closure. In other words, the cum shot is the period at the end of the sentence. In her essay "Speaking Out: Teaching In", Patton reached the conclusion that critics have devoted too little space to discovering the meaning that viewers attach to specific acts such as cum shots.

== See also ==
- Bukkake
- Creampie
- Cum shot
- Dirty Sanchez
- Erotic humiliation
- Fellatio
- Gokkun
- Money shot
- Pearl necklace
- Sexual slang
- Snowballing

== Bibliography ==
- Heck, Richard Kimberly (2021). "How Not to Watch Feminist Pornography". Feminist Philosophy Quarterly. 7 (1) 3. doi:10.5206/fpq/2021.1.10609.
- Taormino, Tristan; Shimizu, Celine Parreñas; Penley, Constance; Miller-Young, Mireille (2013). The Feminist Porn Book: The Politics of Producing Pleasure. New York: Feminist Press at the City University of New York. ISBN 9781558618190. OCLC 828140733.
