= Sexual slang =

Terms and phrases relating to sexual activities

Sexual slang is a set of linguistic terms and phrases used to refer to sexual organs, processes, and activities; they are generally considered colloquial rather than formal or medical, and some may be seen as impolite or improper.

Related to sexual slang is slang related to defecation and flatulence (toilet humor, scatolinguistics). References to the anal tract are often given a sexual connotation in the context of anal sex (in particular, in a context of male homosexuality).

While popular usage is extremely versatile in coining ever new short-lived synonyms, old terms with originally no pejorative colouring may come to be considered inappropriate over time. Thus, terms like arse/ass, cunt, cock and fuck should not be considered "slang," since they are the inherited common English terms for their referents, but they are often considered vulgarisms and are replaced by euphemisms or scientific terminology in "polite" language.

== Pejorative usage ==
Terms of disparagement are used to refer to members of a given sexual minority, gender, sex, or sexual orientation in a derogatory or pejorative manner. They are used as insults by persons who are not or do not wish to be associated with the group being disparaged. For example, queer can be used as an insult by those seeking to deprecate homosexual, bisexual, and transgender or transsexual people, but the word has also undergone reclaiming, such that it can be used positively within that community. Which terms are used as slurs is determined by a society's or subculture's set of values, especially its biases against genders (sexism). For example, words such as whore and slut or bimbo are typically used to refer to sexually promiscuous women.

Sexual slurs are common across many cultures and historical periods. The most common slurs directed against men historically include accusations of being a passive homosexual (Aristophanes notably enjoyed using such allusions) or of being effeminate; for example, in the Hittite military oath, oath-breakers are threatened with being made into women (a promise of either actual castration, or of divine revenge on the traitors' manhood). The pejorative term prick for a contemptible person is also usually used for men.

== Sexual slang and humor ==
In the popular jargon of many cultures, the use of sexual slang is a form of humor or euphemism that often creates controversy over its public use. Sexual humor has been seen in many circles as crude and unsophisticated, as well as insulting towards the subject it describes. Sexual slang has a long history in literature and comedy: examples from Shakespeare are well-known. The popularity of contemporary comedians who indulge in sexual humor, from George Carlin to Andrew Dice Clay, reflects the appeal of this form of speech. It is often seen as a form of taboo, in which much of the appeal lies in the shock value of daring to speak "forbidden" words in public.

== Examples ==
- Bareback – sexual penetration without a condom.
- Bukkake – a group of men masturbating and ejaculating onto a single person.
- Circle jerk – when a group of males masturbate in a circle.
- Creampie – when someone ejaculates inside their partner's vagina or anus, resulting in semen and vaginal fluids dripping from the orifice.
- Cum shot – depiction of a man ejaculating onto another person.
- Cybersex – sexual encounters through technology.
- Dry humping – frottage while clothed. This act is common, although not essential, in the dance style known as "grinding".
- Edging – deliberate delay of one's orgasm, either through masturbation or sexual intercourse.
- Felching – sucking semen out of the vagina or anus of one's partner.
- Gang bang – one person having sex with multiple people in rapid succession or simultaneously.
- Pompoir – use of vaginal muscles to stimulate the penis.
- Quickie – a short sexual encounter.
- Rimming – the oral stimulation of the anus.
- Snowballing – involves a person taking someone's semen into their mouth and passing it to another's mouth.
- Sounding – the penetration of the urethra with an object.
- Teabagging – involves someone placing their scrotum into another person's mouth.

== Sexual slang and social media ==
With the advancement of the internet and social media, it has gotten increasingly easier to communicate and share information rapidly and to a wide audience. As the generations progress they will have their own slangs for certain things and sex is no exception. With Gen Z growing up and creating lots of content on social media such as TikTok, Instagram, or X, they have also brought changes to sexual slang terms. Listed are some sexual slang terms that are commonly referenced, not all of which may have explicit sexual meaning, but are words under the sex umbrella:

- Big dick energy – People who have strong and confident sexual auras
- Body count – The number of people someone has slept with
- Easy – Someone who would do anything for someone else with ease
- FWB – Friends with benefits
- Player – Someone who flirts with many people
- Sneaky link – A person, usually a casual sexual partner, one meets secretively
- Seggs – an alternate word for sex originating from attempts to evade TikTok's moderation

Older examples used in other mediums include 437737, the numerical code for "herpes" on a telephone keypad. It is used especially on dating profiles to self-identify as having the infection

Not all sexual slang words mean only one thing; there can be multiple different meanings for the same word, depending on the context.

== See also ==
- Baseball metaphors for sex
- Glossary of BDSM
- Green's Dictionary of Slang
