= Fellatio =

Oral sex on the penis by a sexual partner

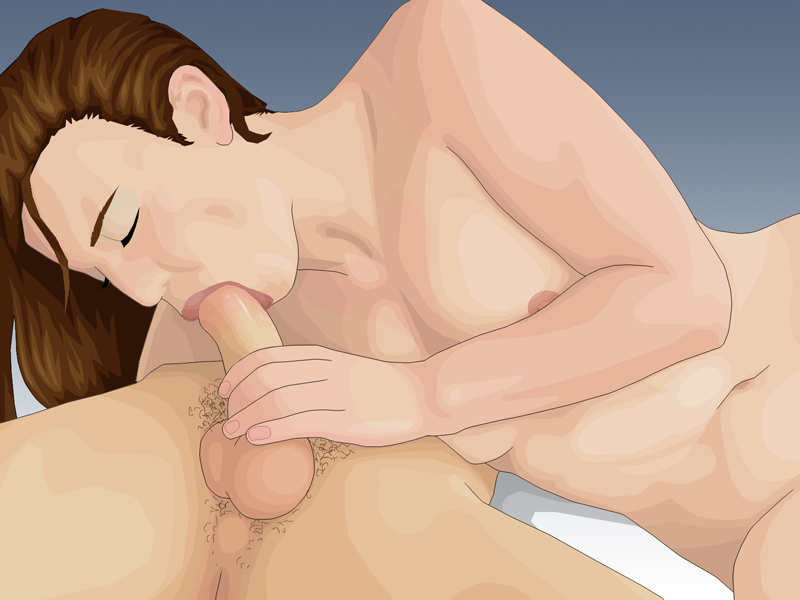
A woman performing fellatio on a man

Fellatio (/fəˈleɪ.ʃi.oʊ/) (also known as fellation, and in slang as blowjob, BJ, giving head, or sucking off) is an oral sex act consisting of the stimulation of a penis by using the mouth. Oral stimulation of the scrotum may also be termed fellatio, or colloquially as teabagging.

It may be performed by a sexual partner as foreplay before other sexual activities, such as vaginal or anal intercourse, or as an erotic and physically intimate act of its own. Fellatio creates a risk of contracting sexually transmitted infections (STIs), but the risk is significantly lower than that of vaginal or anal sex, especially for HIV transmission.

Most countries do not have laws banning the practice of fellatio, though some cultures may consider it taboo. People may also refrain from engaging in fellatio due to personal preference, negative feelings, or sexual inhibitions. Commonly, people do not view oral sex as affecting the virginity of either partner, though opinions on the matter vary.

== Etymology ==
The English noun fellatio comes from the Latin fellātus, the past participle of the verb fellāre, meaning "to suck".

== Practice ==
=== General ===
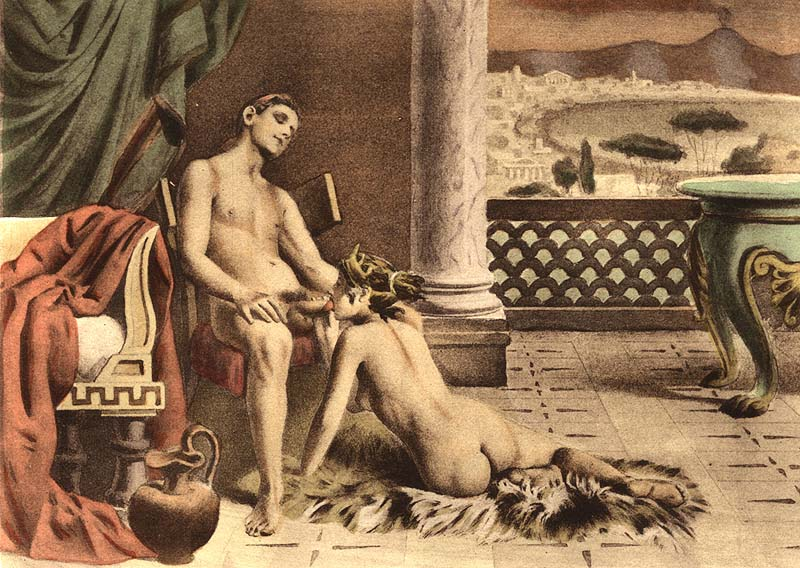
Illustration by Édouard-Henri Avril (1849–1928) depicting fellatio

The essential aspect of fellatio is oral stimulation of the penis (including the shaft and glans) through sucking with the mouth, use of the tongue for licking, using the lips, or some combination. One method is the sex partner taking the penis into the mouth and moving smoothly up and down to a rhythm while being careful to avoid contact with the teeth. Fellatio also includes oral stimulation of the scrotum, whether licking, sucking or taking the entire scrotum into the mouth. During the act, orgasm may be achieved and semen may be ejaculated into the partner's mouth. When the penis is thrust into someone's mouth, it is called irrumatio, though the term is rarely used; "face-fucking" is a more prevalent colloquial term.

Performing fellatio can trigger the gag reflex.

It is physically possible for men with sufficient flexibility, penis size, or both, to perform fellatio on themselves as a form of masturbation, in an act called autofellatio. However, few men possess the flexibility and penis length to safely perform the necessary frontbend.

=== Deposition of semen ===
During fellatio, a partner may ingest semen from the penis. As late as 1976, some doctors were advising women in the eighth and ninth months of pregnancy not to swallow semen lest it induce premature labor, but it was later determined to be safe.

The receiver of fellatio typically becomes sexually aroused. Once the prerequisite level of sexual stimulation has been achieved and ejaculation becomes imminent, the semen may be discharged onto his partner. The male may position his penis prior to ejaculation so that semen will be deposited onto his partner's face (known as a "facial"), or other body part such as their neck, chest or breast.

=== Deep-throating ===
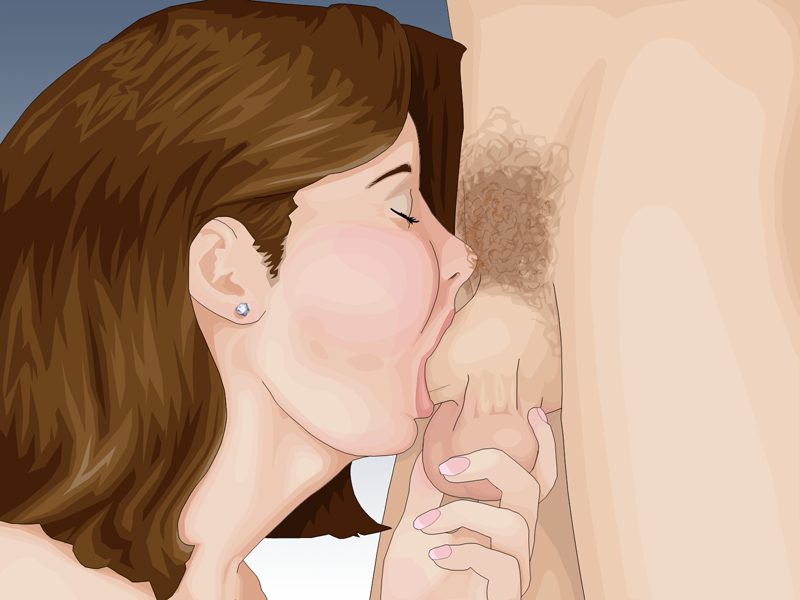
An illustration of a woman deep-throating a man

Deep-throating is a sexual act in which a person takes a partner's entire erect penis into the mouth and throat. The technique and term became popularized by the 1972 pornographic film Deep Throat. For deep-throating, the penis must be long enough so that it can reach the back of the receiver's throat.

Deep-throating can be difficult because of the natural gag reflex that is triggered when the soft palate is touched. People have different sensitivities to this reflex. With practice, some learn to suppress it. Deep-throating leads to a different kind of sexual stimulation of the penis than regular fellatio: the tongue's movement is restricted during deep-throating and sucking becomes impossible; the tightness of the pharynx can intensely stimulate the glans of the penis.

=== Other aspects ===
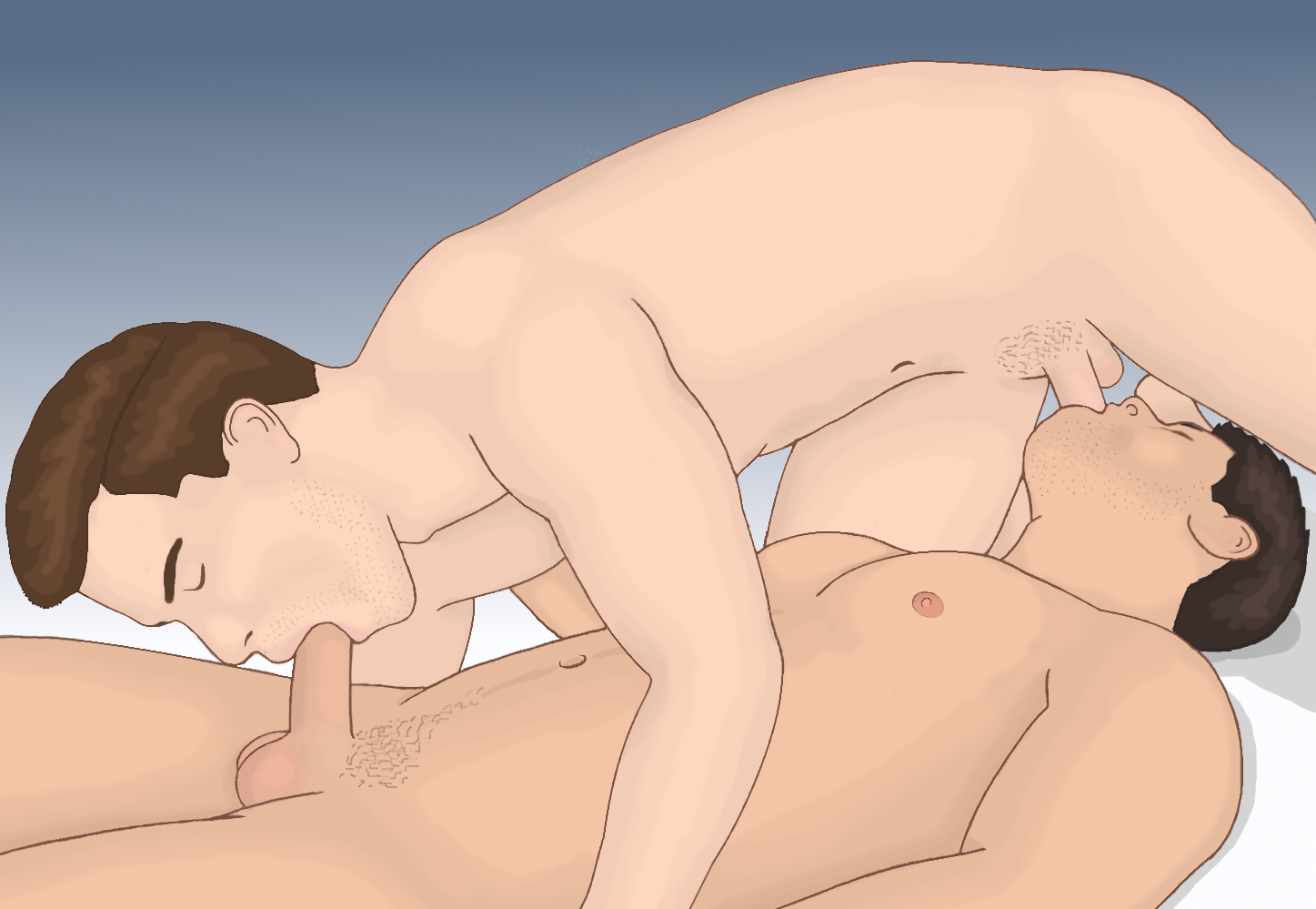
An illustration of two men performing fellatio on each other in the 69 position

The male receiving fellatio receives direct sexual stimulation, while his partner may derive satisfaction from giving him pleasure. Giving and receiving fellatio may happen simultaneously in sex positions like 69 and daisy chain.

Fellatio is sometimes practiced when vaginal or anal penetration would create a physical difficulty for a sex partner. For example, it may be practiced during pregnancy instead of vaginal intercourse by couples wishing to engage in intimate sexual activity while avoiding the difficulty of vaginal intercourse during later stages of pregnancy.

Other reasons why a woman may not wish to have vaginal intercourse include apprehension of losing her virginity or of becoming pregnant, conditions such as endometriosis, vulvodynia/vestibulodynia, or vaginismus that make vaginal penetration painful or impossible, or because she may be menstruating.

== Health aspects ==
=== Sexually transmitted infections ===
Chlamydia, human papillomavirus (HPV), gonorrhea, herpes, hepatitis (multiple strains), and other sexually transmitted infections (STIs) can be transmitted through oral sex. Any sexual exchange of bodily fluids with a person infected with HIV, the virus that causes AIDS, poses a risk of infection. Risk of STI infection, however, is generally considered significantly lower for oral sex than for vaginal or anal sex, with HIV transmission considered the lowest risk with regard to oral sex.

There is an increased risk of STI transmission if the receiving partner has wounds on their genitals, or if the giving partner has wounds or open sores on or in their mouth, or bleeding gums. Brushing the teeth, flossing, or undergoing dental work soon before or after giving fellatio can also increase the risk of transmission, because all of these activities can cause small scratches in the lining of the mouth. These wounds, even when they are microscopic, increase the chances of contracting STIs that can be transmitted orally under these conditions. Such contact can also lead to more mundane infections from common bacteria and viruses found in, around and secreted from the genital regions. Because of the aforementioned factors, medical sources advise the use of condoms or other effective barrier methods when performing or receiving fellatio with a partner whose STI status is unknown.

A 2010 study of HIV-serodiscordant couples found that uninfected partners whose only unprotected sexual contact was oral sex developed systemic HIV-specific CD4+ and CD8+ T-cell immune responses, suggesting that oral exposure to HIV may be sufficient to prime the immune system, although whether these responses confer any protective effect against infection remains unclear. A related 2009 study by Hasselrot et al. at the Karolinska Institutet detected IgA1-mediated HIV-neutralizing antibodies in the saliva of HIV-negative men in long-term serodiscordant relationships who engaged in unprotected oral sex, indicating a mucosal immune response to repeated oral HIV exposure.

=== HPV and oral cancer link ===
Links have been reported between oral sex and oral cancer with HPV-infected people.

A 2007 study suggested a correlation between oral sex and throat cancer. It is believed that this is due to the transmission of HPV, a virus that has been implicated in the majority of cervical cancers and which has been detected in throat cancer tissue in numerous studies. The study concludes that people who had one to five oral sex partners in their lifetime had approximately a doubled risk of throat cancer compared with those who never engaged in this activity and those with more than five oral sex partners had a 250 percent increased risk.

=== Pregnancy and semen exposure ===
Fellatio cannot result in pregnancy, as there is no way for ingested sperm to reach the uterus and fallopian tubes to fertilize an egg cell. At any rate, acids in the stomach and digestive enzymes in the gastrointestinal tract break down and kill spermatozoa.

Clinical research has tentatively linked fellatio with immune modulation, indicating it may reduce the chance of complications during pregnancy. The potentially fatal complication pre-eclampsia was observed to occur less in women who regularly engaged in fellatio, with those who also ingested their partner's semen being at the least risk. The results were consistent with the fact that semen contains TGF-β1, the exchange of which between partners has a causal reduction in risk of pre-eclampsia caused by an immunological reaction. However, fellatio is not the only viable mechanism for the transmission of TGF-β1.

=== Pelvic inflammatory disease ===
A 2012 secondary analysis of the PID Evaluation and Clinical Health (PEACH) data found that among women presenting with signs and symptoms of pelvic inflammatory disease (PID), those who reported oral sex were significantly less likely to have endometritis (adjusted odds ratio 0.5), even after adjusting for confounding factors such as race, number of partners, smoking, and drug use. The authors hypothesized that oral exposure to genital antigens may prime an immune response in the oropharyngeal lymphatic tissue, which could confer a protective effect in the genital tract.

== Cultural views ==
=== Virginity ===
Oral sex is commonly used as a means of preserving virginity, especially among heterosexual pairings; this is sometimes termed technical virginity (which additionally includes anal sex, manual sex and other non-penetrative sex acts, but excludes penile-vaginal sex). The concept of "technical virginity" or sexual abstinence through oral sex is particularly popular among teenagers in the United States, including with regard to teenage girls who not only fellate their boyfriends to preserve their virginities, but also to create and maintain intimacy or to avoid pregnancy. Other reasons given for the practice among teenage girls are peer-group pressure and as their introduction to sexual activity. Additionally, gay males may regard fellatio as a way of maintaining their virginities, with penile-anal penetration defined as resulting in virginity loss, while other gay males may define fellatio as their main form of sexual activity.

=== Legality ===
Fellatio is legal in most countries. Laws of some jurisdictions regard fellatio as penetrative sex for the purposes of sexual offenses with regard to the act, but most countries do not have laws which ban the practice, in contrast to anal sex or extramarital sex. In Islamic literature, the only forms of sexual activity that are consistently explicitly prohibited within marriage are anal sex and sexual activity during menstruation. However, the exact attitude towards oral sex is a subject of disagreements between modern scholars of Islam. Authorities considering it "objectionable" do so because of the penis' supposedly impure fluids coming in contact with the mouth. Others emphasize that there is no decisive evidence to forbid oral sex.

In Malaysia, fellatio is illegal, but the law is seldom enforced. Under Malaysia's Section 377A of the Penal Code, the introduction of the penis into the anus or mouth of another person is considered a "carnal intercourse against the order of nature" and is punishable with imprisonment of 20 years maximum and whipping.

=== Tradition ===
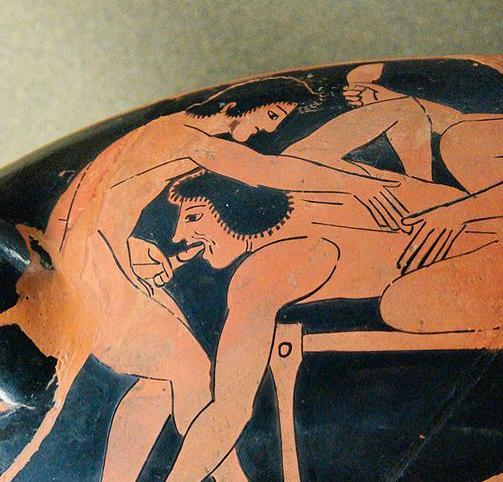
Depiction of fellatio on Attic red-figure kylix, c. 510 BC

Galienus called fellatio lesbiari since women of the island of Lesbos were supposed to have introduced the practice of using one's lips to give sexual pleasure.

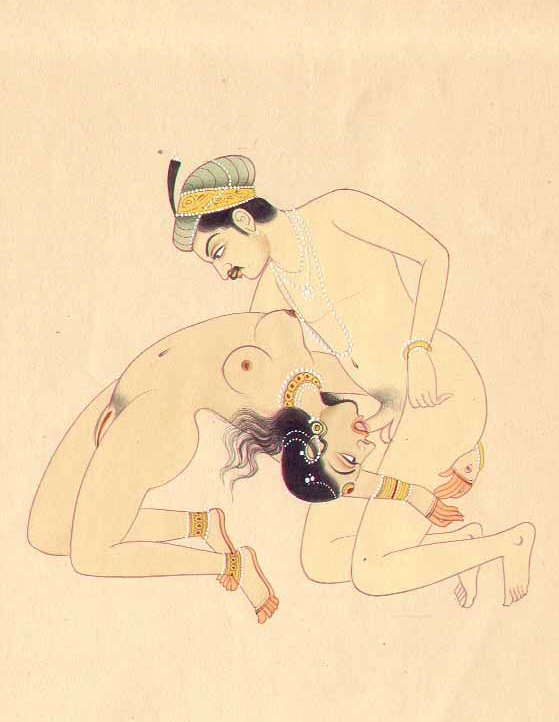
Oral sex depicted in the Kama Sutra

The Ancient Indian Kama Sutra, dating from the first century AD, describes oral sex, discussing fellatio in great detail (the Kama Sutra has a chapter on auparishtaka (or oparishtaka), "mouth congress") and only briefly mentioning cunnilingus. However, according to the Kama Sutra, fellatio is above all a characteristic of eunuchs (or, according to other translations, of effeminate homosexuals or trans women similar to the modern Hijra of India), who use their mouths as a substitute for female genitalia.

Vātsyāyana, the author of the Kama Sutra, states that it is also practiced by "unchaste women", but mentions that there are widespread traditional concerns about this being a degrading or unclean practice, with known practitioners being evaded as love partners in large parts of the country. The author appears to somewhat agree with these attitudes, claiming that "a wise man" should not engage in that form of intercourse while acknowledging that it can be appropriate in some unspecified cases.

The Moche culture of ancient Peru depicted fellatio in their ceramics.

In some cultures, such as Cambodia, Chinese in Southeast Asia, northern Manchu tribes along Amur River, Sambians in Papua New Guinea, Thailand, Telugus of India, Native Hawaiians and other Pacific Islanders, briefly taking the penis of a male infant or toddler into one's mouth was considered a nonsexual form of affection or even a form of ritual, greeting, respect, parenting love, or lifesaving. According to some sources, it was an ancient Chinese custom for grandmothers, mothers, and elder sisters to calm their baby boys with fellatio. It has also been reported that some modern Chinese mothers have performed fellatio to their moribund sons as affection and means for lifesaving, because they culturally believe that when the penis is completely retracted into the abdomen, the boy or man will die.

== Other animals ==
Female bats perform fellatio to increase copulation time. This species is the only non-primate known to exhibit this behaviour.

Flying foxes (a type of bat) have been observed engaging in oral sex. Indian flying fox males will lick a female's vulva both before and after copulation, with the length of pre-copulation cunnilingus positively correlated with length of copulation. The fruit bat Cynopterus sphinx, has been observed to engage in fellatio during mating. Pairs spend more time copulating if the female licks the male than if she does not. Male Livingstone's fruit bats have been observed engaging in homosexual fellatio, although it is unknown if this is an example of sexual behavior or social grooming. Bonin flying foxes also engage in homosexual fellatio, but the behavior has been observed independently of social grooming.

== See also ==
- Bukkake
- Cum shot
- Cunnilingus – oral stimulation of the vulva
- Facial (sexual act)
- Fellatio in Halacha
- Gokkun
- Handjob
- Pearl necklace (sexuality)
- Steak and Blowjob Day
