= Pearl necklace (sexual act) =

Sexual act

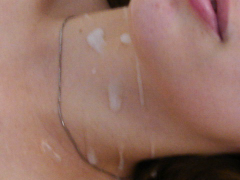
Drops of semen on the neck of a woman

A "pearl necklace" is slang for a sexual act in which a man ejaculates semen on or near the neck or chest of another person. The term originates from the way the deposited semen resembles a necklace of translucent white pearls.

A pearl necklace can be used as a form of erotic humiliation or degradation of the person receiving the semen. Receiving a pearl necklace is an activity that sex workers use as a safe sex alternative for people who prefer not to wear condoms.

== In popular culture ==
- George Carlin used the term in his "Incomplete List of Impolite Words" joke as early as 1984, on the album Carlin on Campus.
- The ZZ Top song "Pearl Necklace" drew attention for its lyrics which were alleged to objectify women.
- The term appears in season 5 episode 3, "Luck Be an Old Lady", of the HBO sex comedy Sex and the City, first broadcast in 2002.
- The term "pearl necklace" is mentioned in the 2014 musical Heathers in the song "I Love My Dead Gay Son".

== See also ==
- Bukkake
- Cum shot
- Erotic humiliation
- Facial
- Snowballing
- Fetish
