= Creampie (sexual act) =

Sexual act involving internal ejaculation

A creampie (also known as internal ejaculation, and often in same-sex contexts as breeding) is a sexual act featured in hardcore pornography in which a man ejaculates inside his partner's vagina (or anus) without the use of a condom, resulting in visible seeping or dripping of semen from the orifice.

== Use in pornography ==
Internal ejaculation shots are a comparatively recent development in pornography; they are not found in early pornographic films. The use of the word creampie to describe such scenes originated in U.S. pornography in the early 2000s and is found in usage as early as the beginning of 1999. The term stems from a comparison to a cream pie, which is filled with "cream" (custard), similar to how an orifice is filled with semen.

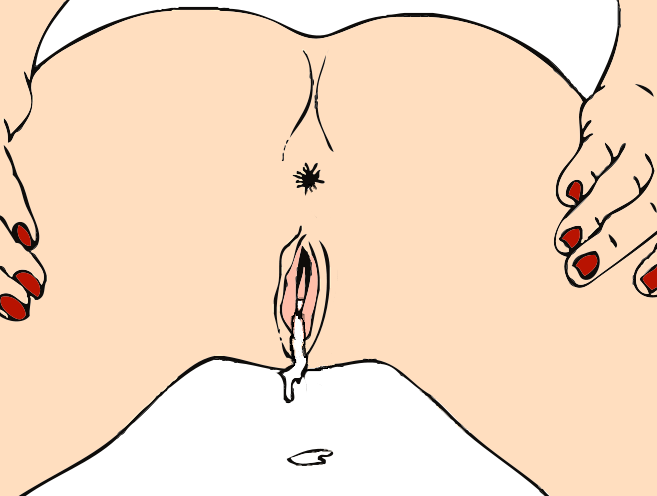
Semen flowing out of a woman's vagina after sexual intercourse without a condom

In straight pornography, sexual activity is often followed by a facial, pearl necklace or other visible ejaculation. Creampie scenes depart from heterosexual pornographic convention in favor of a depiction that more closely mimics sexual activity as performed in ordinary life; they have been called the "counterimage" of facials. Depiction of creampie scenes has become a popular subgenre within heterosexual pornography since the turn of the 21st century, and feature both vaginal and anal ejaculations. In some creampie films, sexual activity, including internal ejaculation, are followed by performers licking up the semen that has dripped from their bodies. Some pornographic films use an artificial semen substitute to simulate or enhance creampie shots.

Internal ejaculations, followed by images of semen dripping from the anus, are sometimes depicted in bareback gay pornography, where they are referred to by the term breeding or the reverse money shot. Breeding is sometimes followed by felching, which involves sucking the semen from the partner's anus.

== Health risks ==
The production of pornography featuring internal ejaculations involves unprotected sex, increasing the risk of pregnancy in women and sexually transmitted infections (STIs) such as HIV. The risk of STIs is markedly increased in anal ejaculations.

In 2004, in a much publicized case, novice pornographic actress Lara Roxx contracted multiple infections, including HIV, from Darren James while filming a scene featuring an anal creampie. James had contracted HIV from having unprotected anal sex with a woman while on a trip to Brazil. He had tested negative for HIV after his return from the trip and infected three out of 13 actresses he worked with before testing positive in a subsequent test and ceasing to perform.
