= Kazuhiko Matsumoto =

Japanese pornographic film director

- 松本和彦
- Born: Japan
- Occupations: Adult video director; producer
- Years active: 1995–present
- Employers: M's Video Group (founder); Moodyz; Soft On Demand; Dogma; S1 No. 1 Style
- Known for: Creating the bukkake genre of Japanese pornography; developing the "M-Vision" filming technique

Kazuhiko Matsumoto (松本和彦) is a Japanese adult video (AV) director who is widely credited with originating the bukkake genre of pornography in 1998. He developed the format as a workaround to Japanese obscenity laws that prohibit graphic depiction of genitalia, allowing visible evidence of male climax without violating the country's mosaic censorship rules.

Matsumoto founded M's Video Group (MVG) in 1995 and has since directed for several major studios, including Moodyz, Soft On Demand, Dogma and S1 No. 1 Style, working with AV idols such as An Nanba, Bunko Kanazawa, Nana Natsume, Yuma Asami, Akiho Yoshizawa and Tina Yuzuki. He competed in Dogma's D-1 Climax Awards in 2005 and 2007, placing fifth in the latter.

For his 2007 D-1 entry Matsumoto introduced "M-Vision", a filming technique that keeps an actress's face and genitals simultaneously in focus. Weekly Playboy named the technique the top innovation expected to change the adult industry in 2008.

== Life and career ==
=== MVG ===
Matsumoto was the founder and first director of M's Video Group (MVG) in 1995. In December 2005, the present company (re-formed in 2005) issued a series of 14 DVDs of Matsumoto's early work to celebrate their 10th anniversary.

Matsumoto is credited with creating the term bukakke and the pornographic genre in 1998 as a response to Japanese censorship of AV. Because any graphic depiction of the pubic hair and genitals were banned in Japanese pornography, directors had to find less direct ways of portraying sexual activity. Matsumoto developed the bukkake genre as a way of following these censorship laws literally while still giving his audience visual evidence of male sexual climax.

Matsumoto has also directed videos in the bukkake genre and other styles for Moodyz and Soft On Demand (SOD). An Nanba and Bunko Kanazawa are two of the prominent AV idols Matsumoto directed while working for the Moodyz company. At SOD he directed Nana Natsume in her first bukakke movie Nana Natsume Showered by Semen.

=== Dogma ===
Matsumoto directed for Dogma in 2003 including a bukkake-gokkun genre video with Kurumi Morishita in March 2003. He was one of nine directors invited to compete in Dogma's D-1 Climax Awards contest in 2005 but his entry Party R [Dogma D1-001] with Rina Yuuki finished last. Matsumoto didn't compete in the 2006 D-1 Climax Awards but his video at the 2007 D-1 Climax Awards, 60 Pussies, Ugly Men, Black Men, Pussy Bukkake, Nakadashi And Fuck! [Dogma D1-301] took 5th place. It was for this video that Matsumoto developed "M-Vision" ("M" for Matsumoto), which allows adult video directors to focus their cameras simultaneously on an actress's face and her genitals. This was named by Weekly Playboy as the number one innovation likely to change the sex industry in 2008.

=== S1 ===
From mid-2007, Matsumoto also directed non-bukkake style videos for S1 No. 1 Style featuring such top AV idols as Yuma Asami, Akiho Yoshizawa, Minori Hatsune and Tina Yuzuki (Rio) which featured his "M-Vision" technique.

== Bibliography ==
- Botting, Geoff (2008-01-13). "SEX-INDUSTRY INNOVATIONS: 2008: A pink revolution". The Japan Times. Archived from the original on 2008-02-15.
