= Salirophilia =

Sexual fetish

Salirophilia (from French salir, lit. "soiling") is a sexual fetish or paraphilia that involves deriving erotic pleasure from soiling or dishevelling the object of one's desire, or viewing them in this state. It may involve tearing or damaging their clothing, covering them in mud or filth, or messing their hair or makeup. The fetish does not necessarily involve harming or injuring the subject.

The fetish can manifest as defacing statues or pictures of people, especially celebrities or fictional characters. It is common to refer to the practice involving ejaculating on a photo as "facepainting". This may be done with a physical photograph or the screen of a phone, tablet, or computer. Fetishists sometimes form collections of defaced images either created by themselves or in collaboration with others. A video or photo of someone ejaculating on a picture of someone is known as a tribute.

== See also ==
- Bukkake
- Mysophilia
- Wet and messy fetishism
- Urolagnia
