= Shuttle Japan =

Japanese adult video production company

- Industry: Pornography
- Headquarters: Shinjuku, Tokyo, Japan
- Key people: Michio Ōtsuka - CEO
- Products: Pornographic films
- Website: http://shuttle-japan.com/

Shuttle Japan (シャトルジャパン, Shatoru Japan) is a Japanese adult video (AV) production company based in Tokyo's Shinjuku ward.

== Company information ==
Shuttle Japan specializes in videos featuring outdoor exhibitionism, bukkake and gokkun as well as other fetish genres. The company registered the term "ぶっかけ/BUKKAKE" as a trademark (No. 4545137) in January 2001. The company director is Michio Ōtsuka (大塚未知雄).

The company operates a website, www.shuttle-japan.com, which distributes its videos. The site, in Japanese and English, has been registered to the company since October 1996. As of mid-2009, the company website listed more than 1300 available Shuttle Japan titles.
