= Mating press =

Sex position

Mating press is a sex position that usually consists of one participant performing downwards sexual penetration into the receiving partner, often holding their legs down or around the head. It is often seen as a more aggressive version of the missionary position, pushing the legs even further, and often associated with aspects of dominance and submission. While the act has been practiced in many countries, it is most often associated with Japanese sex culture, where the term was created, and the act was popularized.

== Etymology ==
The name is derived from the Japanese word 種付けプレス, which is made up of tanetsuke (種付け), which means "mating", and puresu (プレス) which is the English word "press" in katakana. The word was first coined by mangaka Takatsu Keita.

== Practice ==
The act has been performed in some shape and form in various countries throughout history, although without a name. Since then, the act and name have been associated with Japan and credited with popularizing the act. The name and term have become popular outside of Japan thanks in part to the popularity of hentai and Japanese pornography. The term was originally mainly used in pornographic manga, but eventually expanded to real pornography. The term was mainly used as an online meme outside of Japan, but eventually came to be used more often in outside pornographic industries too.

== See also ==
- Woman on top
- Bukkake
- Ekiben (sexual act)
- Gokkun
- Pornography in Japan
