= Facial (disambiguation) =

Facial is a personal care treatment which involves cleaning and moisturizing of the human face.

Facial may also refer to:

- Facial (sexual act), a sexual act where an individual ejaculates semen onto another person's face
- Facial challenge, in American law, a challenge to a statute on grounds that it is unconstitutional
