= Soggy biscuit =

Sex game

Soggy biscuit, ookie cookie:, or limp biscuit is a male group masturbation activity, in which the participants stand around a biscuit (UK) or cookie (US) masturbating and ejaculating onto it; the last person to do so must eat the biscuit. Additionally, a participant who fails to hit the biscuit when he ejaculates must then eat it. The game is reportedly played by adolescents. In Australia, it is also known as soggy SAO after the SAO brand of biscuits that are popular there. In Poland soggy biscuit is known as gra w chlebek (the bread game; in this variant players use a slice of bread instead of a biscuit/cookie) or gra w ciasteczko (the cookie game).

Soggy biscuit is associated with homosexuality, despite the fact that the majority of participants are heterosexual (or at least claim to be); the idea and practice of the game is in keeping with the spirit of adolescent sexual exploration associated by many in the UK with public schools or in Australia with private schools.

According to the book Law of the Playground, 1,866 men were asked: "How close have you got to the game of soggy biscuit, in which you race to wank onto a cracker?" Of the respondents, 6.2% reportedly admitted to having played the game.

In November 2011, The Eagle-Tribune reported that police were investigating claims that two Andover High School basketball players were hazed by older team members into playing the game. In January 2012, it was reported that two students had been expelled over the incident and a further five were suspended. A grand jury was convened to determine whether any of the students should be charged criminally.

== See also ==
- Bukkake
- Cake of Light
- Circle jerk
- Hazing
- Not Gay
- Semen ingestion
