= Hazing =

Abusive, dangerous initiation rituals

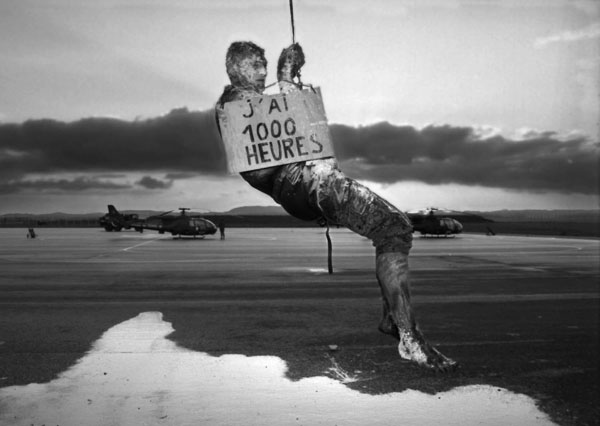
Hazing of a French Army pilot in 1997 after he completed 1,000 flight hours

Hazing (American English), initiation, beasting (British English), bastardisation (Australian English), ragging (South Asian English), or deposition, is an act that humiliates, degrades, abuses, or endangers a person, regardless of their willingness to participate, the enduring of which is expected of them when joining or participating in a group.

Hazing is seen in many different types of social groups, including gangs, sports teams, schools, cliques, universities, fire departments, law enforcement, military units, prisons, fraternities and sororities, and even workplaces in some cases. The initiation rites can range from relatively benign pranks to protracted patterns of behavior that rise to the level of abuse or criminal misconduct.

Hazing is often prohibited by law or institutions such as colleges and universities because it may include either physical or psychological abuse, such as humiliation, nudity, or sexual abuse. Hazing activities have sometimes caused injuries or deaths.

While one explanation for hazing is that it increases group cohesion or solidarity, laboratory and observational evidence on its impacts on solidarity are inconclusive. Other explanations include displaying dominance, eliminating less committed members, and protecting groups that provide large automatic benefits for membership from exploitation by new members.

== Terms ==
In some languages, terms with a religious theme or etymology are preferred, such as baptism or purgatory (e.g. baptême in Belgian French, doop in Belgian Dutch, chrzest in Polish) or variations on a theme of naïveté and the rite of passage such as a derivation from a term for freshman, for example bizutage in European French, ontgroening ('de-green[horn]ing') in Dutch and Afrikaans (South Africa and Namibia), novatada in Spanish, from novato, meaning newcomer or rookie or a combination of both, such as in the Finnish mopokaste (literally 'moped baptism'). In Latvian, the word iesvētības, which means 'in-blessings', is used, also standing for religious rites of passage, especially confirmation. In Swedish, the term used is nollning, literally 'zeroing', as the first-year hazees still are 'zeroes' before attending their first year. In Portugal, the term praxe, which means 'practice' or 'habit', is used for initiation. At education establishments in India, Pakistan, Bangladesh, and Sri Lanka, this practice involves existing students baiting new students and is called ragging.

Hazings are sometimes concentrated in a single session, which may be called a hell night, prolonged to a hell week, or over a long period, resembling fagging. In the Italian military, the term used was nonnismo, from nonno (literally 'grandfather'), a jargon term used for the soldiers who had already served for most of their draft period. A similar equivalent term exists in the Russian military, where a hazing phenomenon known as dedovshchina (дедовщи́на) exists, meaning roughly 'grandfather' or the slang term 'gramps' (referring to the senior corps of soldiers in their final year of conscription).

== Methods of hazing ==
One way of initiating a new member into a street gang is for multiple other members of the gang to assault the new member with a beating.

Hazing activities can involve ridicule and humiliation within the group or in public, while other hazing incidents are akin to pranks. A snipe hunt is such a prank when a newcomer or credulous person is given an impossible task. Examples of snipe hunts include being sent to find a tin of Tartan paint or a "dough repair kit" in a bakery. In the early 1900s, rookies in the Canadian military were ordered to obtain a "brass magnet" when brass is not magnetic.

Spanking is done mainly in the form of paddling among fraternities, sororities, and similar clubs. This practice is also used in the military.

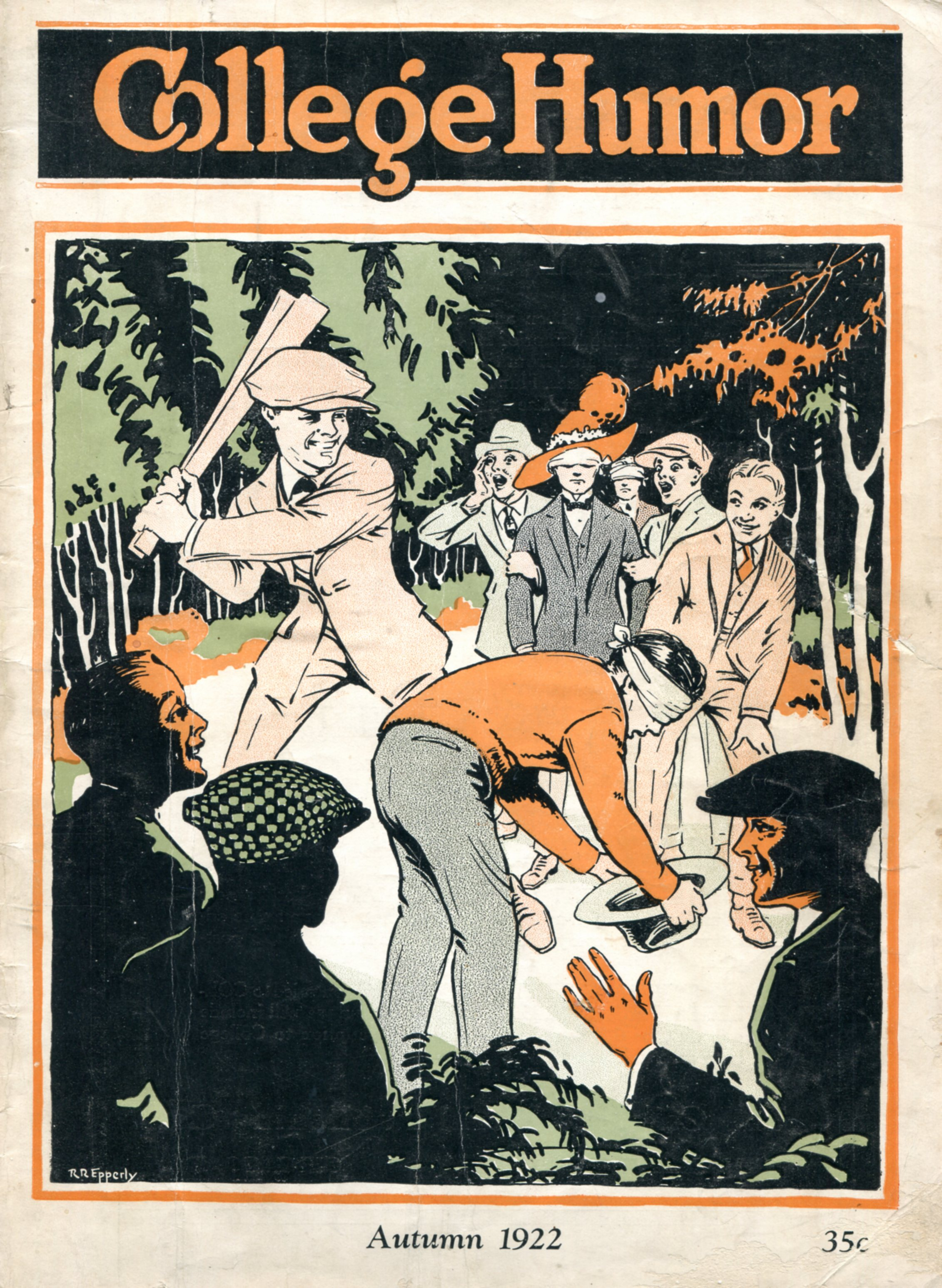
Paddling depicted on 1922 cover of College Humor magazine.

The hazee may be humiliated by being hosed or by sprinklers or buckets, covered with dirt or with (sometimes rotten) food, or even urinated upon. Olive or baby oil may be used to "show off" the bare skin, for wrestling, or just for slipperiness (e.g., to complicate pole climbing). Cleaning may be limited to a dive into the water, hosing down, or even paddling the worst off. They may have to do tedious cleaning, including swabbing the decks or cleaning the toilets with a toothbrush. In fraternities, pledges often must clean up a mess intentionally made by brothers, including fecal matter, urine, and dead animals.

Servitude such as waiting on others (as at fraternity parties) or other forms of housework may be involved, often with obedience tests. Sometimes, the hazee may be made to eat raw eggs, peppers, hot sauce, or drink too much alcohol. Some hazings include eating or drinking things such as bugs or rotting food.

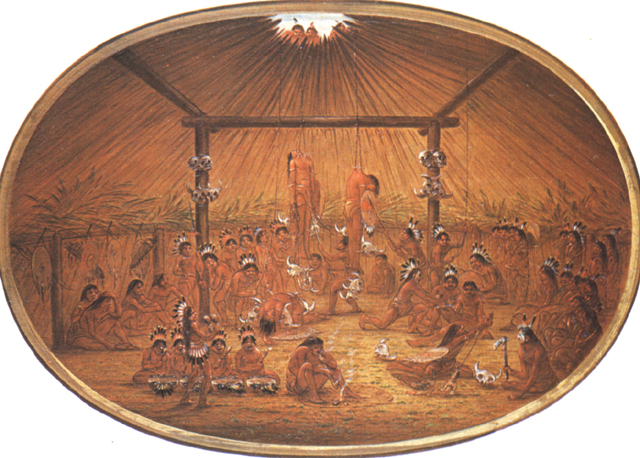
The Okipa ceremony of the Mandan people as witnessed by George Catlin, c. 1832

The hazee may have to wear an imposed piece of clothing, outfit, item, or something else worn by the victim in a way that would bring negative attention to the wearer. Examples include a uniform (e.g., toga), a leash or collar (also associated with bondage), infantile clothing such as bibs or diapers, and other humiliating dress and attire.

Markings may also be made on clothing or bare skin. They are painted, written, tattooed, or shaved on, sometimes collectively forming a message (one letter, syllable, or word on each pledge) or may receive tarring and feathering (or rather a mock version using some glue) or branding.

Submission to senior members of the group is common. Abject "etiquette" required of pledges or subordinates may include prostration, kneeling, groveling, and kissing body parts.

Other physical feats may be required, such as calisthenics and other physical tests, such as mud wrestling, forming a human pyramid, or climbing a greased pole. Exposure to the elements may be required, such as swimming or diving in cold water or snow. A pledge auction is a variation on the slave auction, where people bid on the paraded pledges. Orientation tests may be held, such as abandoning pledges without transport. Dares include jumping from some height, stealing items, and obedience.

Blood pinning among military aviators (and many other elite groups) to celebrate becoming new pilots is done by piercing their chests with the sharp pins of aviator wings. On a pilot's first solo flight, they are often drenched with water and have the back of their shirt cut off to celebrate the achievement. Cutting off the back of the shirt originates from the days of tandem trainers, where the instructor sat behind the students and tugged on the back of their shirts to get their attention; cutting off the back of the shirt symbolizes that the instructor does not need to do that anymore. On their first crossing the equator in military and commercial navigation, each "pollywog" is subjected to a series of tests, usually including running or crawling a gauntlet of abuse and various scenes supposedly situated at King Neptune's court.

Hazing also occurs for apprentices in some trades, often involving beatings, shaving the heads, physical and sexual assault, or smearing the genitals with grease or wax.

== Psychology, sociology, purpose and effects ==
=== Solidarity and group cohesion ===
One theory proposed to explain hazing behaviors is that it increases solidarity among a group's inductees, between the inductees and existing members, or between new members and the group.

==== Laboratory studies ====
Attempts at replicating hazing in laboratory studies have yielded inconclusive results concerning group solidarity. A 1959 study by Aronson and Mills found that students made to read embarrassing material to join a discussion group reported liking the group more. On the other hand, a 1991 experiment by Hautaluoma et al. found that severe initiations could sometimes lead to lower liking for a group. Laboratory-based recreations of hazing may be limited in informativeness because they are only able to impose brief unpleasant experiences whose severity is limited by ethical restrictions on laboratory research. Real-world hazing may last months, may be far more severe, and may involve a confluence of different feelings, in contrast to the relatively simple distress induced in laboratory experiments. Researcher Aldo Cimino also points out that laboratory groups are "ephemeral", whereas real-world organizations that engage in hazing are "serious and enduring coalitions".

==== Naturalistic surveys and studies ====
Surveys and studies examining real-world hazing have also yielded inconclusive results about its impacts on group solidarity.

A 2022 study of new members of an American social fraternity that engaged in hazing found that hazing was "not substantially related to feelings of solidarity".

A 2016 survey of members of sororities and fraternities in the Netherlands found that mentally severe, but not physically severe, initiation rituals were linked to lower affiliation with fellow inductees and that the humiliation experienced by inductees explained this relationship.

A 2007 survey of student-athletes conducted by Van Raalte et al. found that hazing was associated with lower task cohesion and had no apparent relation to social cohesion; by contrast, appropriate team building activities had a positive impact on social cohesion but had little impact on task cohesion. The study, which included activities like "tattooing" and "engaging in or simulating sex acts" as "acceptable team building" activities because respondents categorized them as appropriate, has been criticized for using an improper definition for hazing.

==== Views and theories ====
Citing the 1959 study by Aronson and Mills, Psychologist Robert Cialdini uses the framework of consistency and commitment to explain the phenomenon of hazing and the vigor and zeal to which practitioners of hazing persist in and defend these activities even when they are made illegal. The 1959 study shaped the development of cognitive dissonance theory by Leon Festinger.

Many people view hazing as an effective way to teach respect and develop discipline and loyalty within the group and believe that hazing is a necessary component of initiation rites. Hazing can be used as a way to engender conformity within a social group, something that can be seen in many sociological studies. Moreover, initiation rituals when managed effectively can serve to build team cohesion and improve team performance, while negative and detrimental forms of hazing alienate and disparage individuals.

Dissonance can produce feelings of group attraction or social identity among initiates after the hazing experience because they want to justify the effort used. Rewards during initiations or hazing rituals matter in that initiates who feel more rewarded express a stronger group identity. As well as increasing group attraction, hazing can produce conformity among new members. Hazing could also increase feelings of affiliation because of the stressful nature of the hazing experience. Also, hazing has a hard time of being extinguished by those who saw it to be potentially dangerous like administration in education or law enforcement.

A 2014 paper by Harvey Whitehouse discusses theories that hazing can cause social cohesion though group identification and identity fusion. A 2017 study published in Scientific Reports found that groups that share painful or strong negative experiences can cause visceral (i.e., gut level, or ingrained) bonding and pro-group behavior.

=== Dominance over new members ===
Another theory that seeks to explain hazing is that hazing activities allow senior members to exercise dominance and establish power over newer members.

Anthropologist Aldo Cimino notes that some elements of hazing are not entirely consistent with the theory that it is a pure display of dominance. Hazing occurs in a "ceremonial or ritualistic" context that creates a distinction between hazing activities and everyday life, which is inconsistent with a desire to set up a lasting dominance hierarchy. Newcomers also gain a far more egalitarian standing after hazing ends, showing that the dynamics that occur during hazing are "profoundly exaggerated relative to the actual social hierarchy".

=== Selection ===
The theory of hazing as a selection mechanism posits that hazing seeks to eliminate prospective members who are not sufficiently committed to a group or who would otherwise be free riders.

Anthropologist Aldo Cimino notes that hazing ordeals can sometimes provide information about how a prospective member values a group by demonstrating the costs they are willing to endure. Cimino also notes, however, those common elements of hazing, such as disorientation and intimidation, may cause people to endure hazing rituals regardless of how much they value a group, and that hazing occurs even in situations in which less committed inductees are not free to leave, suggesting that selection may not fully explain hazing activities.

=== Protection from exploitation of automatic benefits ===
Aldo Cimino proposes that hazing is an evolutionarily-acquired behavior that specifically seeks to protect groups from the exploitation of "automatic benefits"—benefits that are automatically gained by being a member of the group—by newcomers.

== Prevention ==
=== Anti-hazing messaging ===
In the United States, universities and hazing-prevention organizations have published messages directed at students that seek to deter students from engaging in hazing activities. This includes messaging focused on the potential harms of hazing, the ineffectiveness of hazing for group bonding, and social norms statistics that show large majorities in opposition to hazing.

Hazing researcher Aldo Cimino has noted that the anti-hazing messaging released by institutions is sometimes inaccurate and that the ambiguous state of current research on hazing makes it difficult to accurately make strong claims about the effects of hazing activities of differing severities.

== Scope ==
=== China ===
In June 27, 2012 in the China Fire Services Wuhai Fire Department's Wuda District 2nd Company, eight older firefighters continuously beat and verbally abused five new firefighters as part of a hazing ritual. The footage was leaked onto Weibo on December 9, 2013, sparking public outrage. Since the China Fire Services was part of the Ministry of Public Security Active Service Forces, it is often considered a military hazing incident.

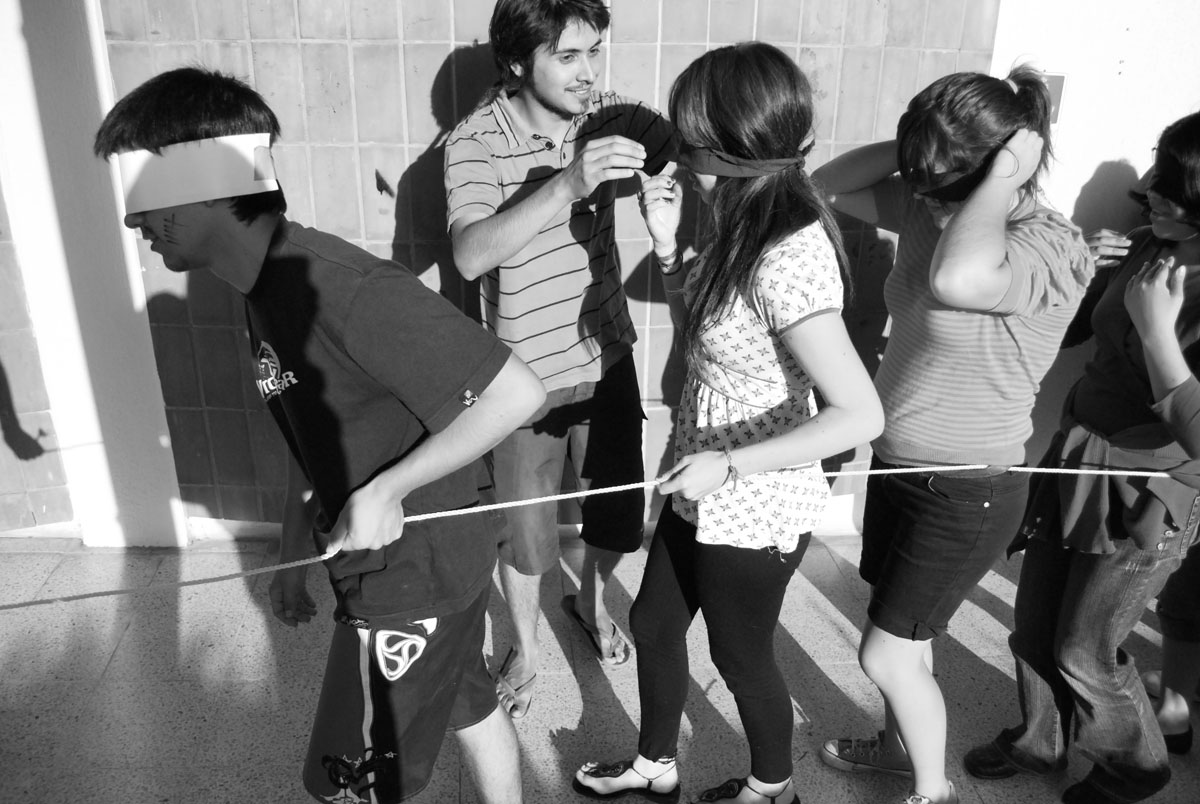
Tied and blindfolded first-year students from Universidad de Talca, Chile

=== United States ===
According to one of the largest US National Surveys regarding hazing including over 60,000 student-athletes from 2,400 colleges and universities:

Over 325,000 athletes at more than 1,000 National Collegiate Athletic Association schools in the US participated in intercollegiate sports during 1998–99. Of these athletes:

- More than a quarter of a million experienced some form of hazing to join a college athletic team.
- One in five was subjected to unacceptable and potentially illegal hazing. They were kidnapped, beaten, tied up, and abandoned. They were also forced to commit crimes – destroying property, making prank phone calls, or harassing others.
- Half were required to participate in drinking contests or alcohol-related hazing.
- Two in five consumed alcohol on recruitment visits, even before enrolling.
- Two-thirds were subjected to humiliating hazing, such as being yelled at or sworn at, forced to wear embarrassing clothing (if any clothing at all), or forced to deprive themselves of sleep, food, or personal hygiene.
- One in five participated exclusively in positive initiations, such as team trips or ropes courses.

The survey found that 79% of college athletes experienced some form of hazing to join their team, yet 60% of the student-athlete respondents indicated that they would not report hazing incidents.

A 2007 survey at American colleges found that 55% of students in "clubs, teams, and organizations" experienced behavior the survey defined as hazing, including in varsity athletics and Greek-letter organizations. This survey found that 47% of respondents experienced hazing before college; in 25% of hazing cases, school staff were aware of the activity. 90% of students who experienced behavior the researchers defined as hazing did not consider themselves to have been hazed, and 95% of those who experienced what they defined as hazing did not report it. The most common hazing-related activities reported in student groups included alcohol consumption, humiliation, isolation, sleep deprivation, and sex acts.

Police forces, especially those with a paramilitary tradition or sub-units of police forces such as tactical teams, may also have hazing rituals. Rescue services, such as lifeguards or air-sea rescue teams may have hazing rituals.

=== Belgium ===
In Belgium, hazing rituals are a common practice in student clubs (fraternities and sororities, called studentenclubs in Dutch and cercles étudiants in French) and student societies (called studentenverenigingen, studentenkringen or faculteitskringen in Dutch and associations étudiantes or associations facultaires in French). The latter are typically attached to the faculty of the university. In contrast, the first ones are privately operated by hazing committees (Dutch: doopcommissies, French: comités de baptême), which are usually led by older students who have previously been hazed themselves. Hazing rituals in student societies have generally been safer than those in student clubs, precisely because they are to some extent regulated by universities.

For example, KU Leuven drew up a hazing charter in 2013 following an animal cruelty incident in the hazing ritual of student club Reuzegom. The charter was to be signed by student societies, fraternities, and sororities. Signing the charter would have been a pledge to notify the city of the place and time of the hazing ceremony and to abstain from violence, racism, extortion, bullying, sexual assault, discrimination, and the use of vertebrate animals. Reuzegom, as well as the other fraternities and sororities of the Antwerp Guild, refused. In 2018, twenty-year-old student Sanda Dia died from multiple organ failure in the Reuzegom hazing ritual as a result of abuse by fellow Reuzegom members. The killing of a black student in a mostly-white fraternity, some of whose members are alleged to have engaged in racist behaviour, led to controversy. As of 2019, a few sororities have signed the charter, as well as all student societies. In April 2019, the 28 remaining fraternities in Leuven signed the charter.

=== Netherlands ===
In the Netherlands, the 'traditional fraternities' have an introduction time, including hazing rituals. The pledges go to a camp for a few days, during which they undergo hazing rituals. Meanwhile, they are introduced to the traditions of the fraternity. After camp, there are usually evenings or whole days when the pledges must be present at the fraternity. However, the pressure is released slowly, and the relations become somewhat more equal. Often, pledges collect or perform chores to raise funds for charity. At the end of the hazing period, the new members' inauguration occurs. Hazing ritual often include alcohol abuse, mental and physical abuse, and violence. Incidents have occurred, resulting in injuries and death.

In 1965, a student at Utrecht University choked to death during a hazing ritual (Roetkapaffaire). There was public outrage when the perpetrators were convicted to light conditional sentences while left-wing Provo demonstrators were given unconditional prison sentences for order disturbances. The fact that the magistrates handling the case were all alumni of the same fraternity gave rise to accusations of nepotism and class justice. Two incidents in 1997, leading to one heavy injury and one death, led to sharpened scrutiny over hazing. Hazing incidents have nevertheless occurred since, but justice is becoming keener in persecuting perpetrators.

The Netherlands has no anti-hazing legislation. Hazing incidents can be handled by internal resolution by the fraternity itself (in the lightest cases) or via the criminal justice system as assault or, in case of death, negligent homicide or manslaughter. Universities generally support student unions (financially and by granting board members a discount on the required number of ECTS credits). Still, in the most extreme case, they can suspend or withdraw recognition and support for such unions.

=== Philippines ===
There is a long history of fraternity and school hazing in the Philippines. The first recorded death due to hazing in the Philippines was recorded in 1954, with the death of Gonzalo Mariano Albert. Hazing was regulated under the Anti-Hazing Act of 1995 after the death of Leonardo Villa in 1991. Still, many cases, usually causing severe injury or death, continued even after it was enacted, the including the death of Darwin Dormitorio, a 20-year-old Cadet 4th Class from the Philippine Military Academy. In 2018, the Philippines updated its Anti-Hazing Act to include all forms of hazing with organizations both in and outside of schools, including businesses and the military.

=== Republic of Ireland ===
Hazing incidents are relatively rare in the Republic of Ireland but are known at certain elite educational institutions.

At Trinity College Dublin, an all-male society, Knights of the Campanile, was implicated in a hazing incident in 2019, where initiates were taunted, jeered at, told to get in a shower, insulted each other, and required to eat large amounts of butter. Campus newspaper The University Times was criticised for using secret recording devices to record the event. Dublin University Boat Club is also known for hazing, with rituals including consumption of alcohol, stripping to one's underwear, caning with bamboo rods, push-ups, being shouted at, standing in the rain, being tied together by shoelaces and crawling a maze while being hit with pillows. Hazing is common at Trinity sports societies and teams. Zeta Psi fraternity has a presence at Trinity as well, and some hazing has been reported.

Hazing also took place at Dublin City University's Accounting & Finance Society in 2018, where first-years standing for committee positions had to complete a variety of sexualized games. The club was suspended for a year as a result.

A report on Gaelic games county players noted that 6% of players reported were aware of forced binge drinking as a form of hazing.

=== Ragging in South Asia ===
Ragging is similar to hazing in educational institutions in the Indian subcontinent. The word is mainly used in India, Pakistan, Bangladesh and Sri Lanka. Ragging involves existing students baiting or bullying new students. It often takes a malignant form wherein the newcomers may be subjected to psychological or physical torture. In 2009, the University Grants Commission of India imposed regulations upon Indian universities to help curb ragging. It launched a toll-free 'anti-ragging helpline'. The effectiveness of these measures are unknown; many accused of ragging first-year students are either let out with a warning or saved from legal action by political or caste lobbyists.

Although ragging is a criminal offense in Sri Lanka under the Prohibition of Ragging and Other Forms of Violence in Educational Institutions Act, No. 20 of 1998, and carries a severe punishment, several variations of ragging can be observed in universities around the country. Through the years, this practice has worsened all types of violence, including sexual violence and harassment, and has also claimed the lives of several students. The university grants commission of Sri Lanka, have set up several pathways to report ragging incidents, including a special office, helpline and a mobile app where students can make a complaint anonymously or seek help.

== Controversy ==
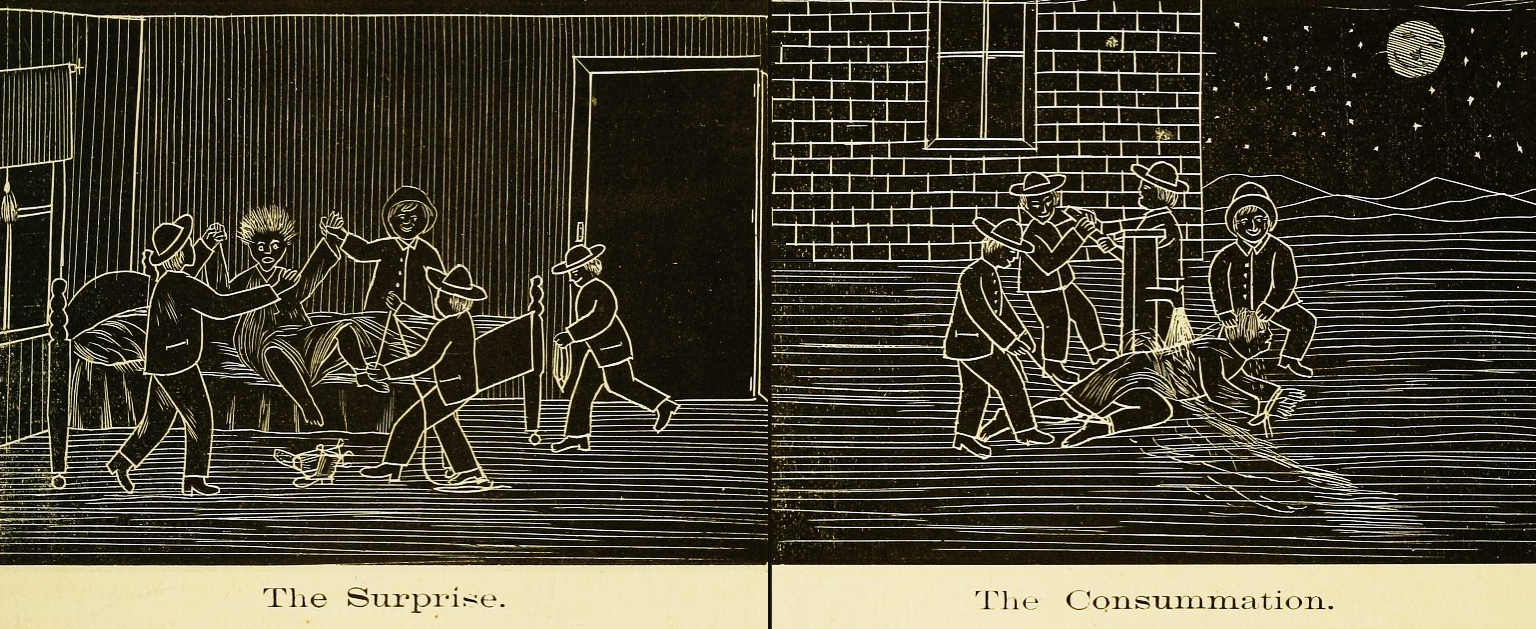
The "Scenes of Hazing", as portrayed in an early student yearbook of the Massachusetts Agricultural College. c. 1879.

Because of its long-term acceptance and secretive nature of the ritual abuse among social groups the practice of hazing is not clearly understood. In military circles, hazing is sometimes assumed to test recruits under situations of stress and hostility. According to opponents, the problem with this approach is that the stress and hostility come from inside the group and not from outside as in actual combat situations, creating suspicion and distrust towards the superiors and comrades-in-arms. Willing participants may be motivated by a desire to prove to senior soldiers their stability in future combat situations, making the unit more secure. Still, blatantly brutal hazing can produce negative results, making the units more prone to break, desert, or mutiny than those without hazing traditions, as observed in the Russian army in Chechnya, where units with the strongest traditions of dedovshchina were the first to break and desert under enemy fire. At worst, hazing may lead into fragging incidents. Colleges and universities sometimes avoid publicizing hazing incidents for fear of damaging institutional reputations or incurring financial liability to victims.

In a 1999 study, a survey of 3,293 collegiate athletes, coaches, athletic directors, and deans found a variety of approaches to prevent hazing, including strong disciplinary and corrective measures for known cases, implementation of athletic, behavioral, and academic standards guiding recruitment; provisions for alternative bonding and recognition events for teams to prevent hazing; and law enforcement involvement in monitoring, investigating, and prosecuting hazing incidents. Hoover's research suggested half of all college athletes are involved in alcohol-related hazing incidents, while one in five is involved in potentially illegal hazing incidents. Only another one in five was involved in what Hoover described as positive initiation events, such as taking team trips or running obstacle courses.

Hoover wrote: "Athletes most at risk for any kind of hazing for college sports were men, non-Greek members, and either swimmers, divers, soccer players, or lacrosse players. The campuses where hazing was most likely to occur were primarily in eastern or southern states with no anti-hazing laws. The campuses were rural, residential, and had Greek systems." (Hoover uses the term "Greek" to refer to U.S.-style fraternities and sororities.) Hoover found that non-fraternity members were most at risk of hazing and that football players were most at risk of potentially dangerous or illegal hazing. In the May issue of the American Journal of Emergency Medicine, Michelle Finkel reported that hazing injuries are often not recognized for their actual cause in emergency medical centers. The doctor said hazing victims sometimes hide the real cause of injuries out of shame or to protect those who caused the harm. In protecting their abusers, hazing victims can be compared with victims of domestic violence, Finkel wrote.

Finkel cites hazing incidents including "beating or kicking to the point of traumatic injury or death, burning or branding, excessive calisthenics, being forced to eat unpleasant substances and psychological or sexual abuse of both males and females". Reported coerced sexual activity is sometimes considered "horseplay" rather than rape, she wrote. Finkel quoted from Hank Nuwer's book Wrongs of Passage, which counted 56 hazing deaths between 1970 and 1999.

In November 2005, controversy arose over a video showing Royal Marines fighting naked and intoxicated as part of a hazing ritual. The fight culminated with one soldier receiving a kick to the face, rendering him unconscious. The victim, according to the BBC, said "It's just Marine humour". The Marine who leaked the video said "The guy laid out was inches from being dead."

In 2008, Elizabeth Allan and Mary Madden from the University of Maine conducted a national hazing study. This investigation is the most comprehensive study of hazing to date. It includes responses from more than 11,000 undergraduate students at 53 colleges and universities in different regions of the United States and interviews with more than 300 students and staff at 18 of these campuses. Through the vision and efforts of many, this study fills a significant gap in the research and extends the breadth and depth of knowledge and understanding about hazing. Ten initial findings are described in the report, "Hazing in View: College Students at Risk". These include:

1. More than half of college students in clubs, teams, and organizations experience hazing.
2. Nearly half (47%) of students have experienced hazing before coming to college.
3. Alcohol consumption, humiliation, isolation, sleep deprivation, and sex acts are hazing practices common across student groups.

== Hazing incidents at European universities ==
- 1495: Leipzig University banned the hazing of freshmen by other students: "Statute Forbidding Any One to Annoy or Unduly Injure the Freshmen. Each and every one attached to this university is forbidden to offend with insult, torment, harass, drench with water or urine, throw on or defile with dust or any filth, mock by whistling, cry at them with a terrifying voice, or dare to molest in any way whatsoever physically or severely, any, who are called freshmen, in the market, streets, courts, colleges and living houses, or any place whatsoever, and particularly in the present college, when they have entered to matriculate or are leaving after matriculation."
- 1997: During the hazing period of a Dutch fraternity, a pledge was run over by members when he was sleeping drunk in the grass. A few weeks later, a pledge, Reinout Pfeiffer, died after drinking a large quantity of jenever as part of an initiation ritual for his student house attached to the same fraternity. These incidents prompted Dutch fraternities to regulate their hazing rituals more strictly.
- 2005: in May 2005, a Dutch student almost died from water intoxication after participating in a hazing drinking game in which the liquor was replaced by water.
- 2005: The victim of a high-profile hazing attack in Russia, Andrey Sychyov, required the amputation of his legs and genitalia after he was forced to squat for four hours whilst being beaten and tortured by a military group on New Year's Eve, 2005. President Vladimir Putin spoke out about the incident and ordered Defense Minister Sergei Ivanov "to submit proposals on legal and organizational matters to improve educational work in the army and navy".
- 2010: In a hazing incident in the Netherlands, pledges were asked to 'baffle the members' with a stunt. They decided to do so by dressing one of them in a Sinterklaas costume, dousing the suit in lamp oil, and setting it on fire. The victim jumped in the water in his burning costume and suffered second-degree burns, needing medical treatment. The student who set the victim's costume on fire was sentenced to 50 hours of unpaid work.
- 2016: In August 2016, a student in a Dutch fraternity suffered serious head injuries after a member forced him to lie on the floor, placed his foot on his head, and exercised pressure on the skull. The perpetrator was convicted to a prison sentence of 31 days (of which 30 days were conditional), 240 hours of unpaid labor, and €5,066.80 damage compensation to the victim. The perpetrator appealed against this verdict, after which it was reduced in appeal to a fine of €1,000.
- 2016: In December 2016, Newcastle University student Ed Farmer, 20, died from a cardiac arrest and immense brain damage after an initiation ceremony into the Agricultural Society. Events included head shaving, being sprayed with paint used to mark stock, drinking vodka from a pig's head, and bobbing for apples in a mixture of urine and alcohol. Farmer was known to have drunk 27 vodka shots in three hours. Initiation ceremonies have been strictly banned by the university.
- 2018: Three Flemish Belgian students, from the KU Leuven were hospitalized after consuming a large amount of fish sauce as part of a hazing ritual. One slipped into a coma and died, likely due to a combination of the high concentration of salt in the sauce and hypothermia.

== Hazing deaths at Asian universities ==
- 1993–2007: In Indonesia, 35 people died as a result of hazing initiation rites in the Institute of Public Service (IPDN). The most recent was in April 2007 when Cliff Muntu died after being beaten by the seniors.
- 1997: Selvanayagam Varapragash, a first-year engineering student at University of Peradeniya, was murdered on the campus due to hazing. He was subjected to sadistic ragging, and in a post-mortem examination, a large quantity of toothpaste was found in his rectum.
- 2002: Rupa Rathnaseeli, a 22-year-old student of the Faculty of Agriculture, University of Peradeniya, Sri Lanka, became paralyzed in 1975 as a result of jumping from the second floor of the hostel "Ramanathan Hall" to escape the physical ragging carried out by older students. It was reported that she was about to have a candle inserted into her vagina just before she jumped out of the hostel building. She died by suicide in 2002.
- 2007: On June 26 at the Tokitsukaze stable, 17-year-old sumo wrestler Takashi Saito was beaten to death by his fellow rikishi with a beer bottle and metal baseball bat at the direction of his trainer, Jun'ichi Yamamoto. Though Saito's cause of death was originally reported as heart failure, his father demanded an autopsy, which uncovered evidence of the beating. Both Yamamoto and the other rikishi were charged with manslaughter.
- 2022: A student from the University of Cebu, named Ronnel Baguio, died in December, due to fraternity hazing.

== Notable examples in the U.S. ==
These examples are limited to incidents in the U.S. which did not lead to death.

- 1864: Cambridge, Massachusetts, a Harvard University Student, Joseph Webb, was expelled for hazing.
- 1873: A New York Times headline read: "West Point. 'Hazing' at the Academy – An Evil That Should be Entirely Rooted Out"
- 1900: Oscar Booz began at West Point in June 1898 in good physical health. Four months later, he resigned due to health problems. He died in December 1900 of tuberculosis. During his long struggle with the illness, he blamed the illness on hazing he received at West Point in 1898, claiming he had hot sauce poured down his throat on three occasions as well as several other grueling hazing practices, such as brutal beatings and having hot wax poured on him in the night. His family claimed that scarring from the hot sauce made him more susceptible to the infection, causing his death. Among other things, Booz claimed that his devotion to Christianity made him a target and that he was tormented for reading his Bible.

The practice of hazing at West Point entered the national spotlight following his death. Congressional hearings investigated his death and the pattern of systemic hazing of first-year students, and serious efforts were made to reform the system and end hazing at West Point.

- 1903: Three young boys in Vermont, aged 11, 10, and 7, read about hazing practices in college and decided to try it themselves. They built a fire in a pasture behind the schoolhouse, leading 9-year-old Ralph Canning to the spot. They heated several stones until they were red hot. The boys forced Canning to both sit and stand on the hot stones and held him there despite his screams. The boys then either walked or jumped on him (depending on the source). He was finally allowed to leave, and he crawled home, where he died two weeks later.
- 1967: Delta Kappa Epsilon, Yale University. Future US president George W. Bush (who at the time was president of the fraternity) was implicated in a scandal where members of the DKE fraternity were accused of branding triangles onto the lower back of pledges. Bush is quoted as dismissing the injuries as "only a cigarette burn". The fraternity received a fine for their behavior.
- 2004: In Sandwich, Massachusetts, nine high school football players faced felony charges after a freshman teammate lost his spleen in a hazing ritual.
- 2011: Two Andover High School basketball players were expelled and five were suspended for pressuring first- and second-year students to play "wet biscuit", where the loser was forced to eat a semen-soaked cookie.
- 2011: Thirteen students from Florida Agricultural and Mechanical University attacked drum major Robert Champion on a bus after a marching band performance, beating him to death. Since then, a series of reports of abuse and hazing within the band have been documented. In May 2012, two faculty members resigned in connection with a hazing investigation, and 13 people were charged with felony or misdemeanor hazing crimes. Eleven of those individuals faced one count of third-degree felony hazing resulting in death, which is punishable by up to six years in prison. The FAMU incident prompted Florida Governor Rick Scott to order all state universities to examine their hazing and harassment policies in December. Scott also asked all university presidents to remind their students, faculty and staff "how detrimental hazing can be".
- 2013: Tyler Lawrence, a student at Wilmington College (Ohio), lost a testicle as a result of hazing involving lying down nude on a basement floor in three inches of water, being stuffed with Limburger cheese, simulating intercourse with a ball of stuffing, and finally being hit in his scrotum with towels and shirts that were tied into balled ends or had items tied inside of them. Despite being painfully injured, he was then forced to sit up and swallow vinegar-soaked bananas.
- 2014: Seven members of the Sayreville War Memorial High School football team in Sayreville, New Jersey, were arrested and charged with sexual assaults on younger players. "In the darkness, a freshman football player would be pinned to the locker-room floor, his arms and feet held down by multiple upperclassmen. Then, the victim would be lifted to his feet" and sexually abused. Six of the team members were sentenced for lesser crimes, and the seventh case was still pending in 2016.
- 2015: Western Kentucky University swim team hazing scandal – After investigations revealed several incidents of hazing within the swimming and diving program at Western Kentucky University, the university placed the entire program on a five-year suspension. As of 2026, the program has yet to be revived.
- 2021: Danny Santulli was made to drink 1.75 liters (59 US fl oz) of vodka at a University of Missouri fraternity. He was 18 at the time. The incident left him with severe brain damage, complete loss of eyesight, and unable to walk or communicate in any way.
- 2023: The coach of the Northwestern University football team was fired after allegations surfaced of physically and sexually abusive hazing on the team.
- 2024: At the University of Iowa, a fire alarm went off in a fraternity house, and police found a group of shirtless pledges that were blindfolded and had various items thrown at them. The fraternity was suspended until 2029.
- 2025: Two fraternity pledges were hospitalized for burns after being set on fire as part of hazing at University of Tennessee at Chattanooga. Victims were also subjected to water torture, laid on beds of mouse traps, and had lemon juice squeezed into their eyes. No charges were filed, leading to allegations of corruption.

== See also ==
- Bullying
- Dedovshchina
- Effort justification
- Groupthink
- Hazing in Greek letter organizations
- Identity formation
- No pain, no gain
- Organizational culture
- Redemptive suffering
- Schadenfreude
- Sconcing
- Self-abasement
- Stanford prison experiment
- Stockholm syndrome
- Stress exposure training
