= Cliff Muntu =

Indonesian student killed by hazing

- Born: June 8, 1987; Manado, Indonesia
- Died: September 18, 2019 (aged 20); Jatinangor, Sumedang Regency, Indonesia
- Cause of death: Death by hazing
- Resting place: TPU Kairagi I, Manado
- Education: Institute of Home Affairs Governance
- Occupation: Cadet student

Cliff Muntu (8 June 1987 in Manado, North Sulawesi – 3 April 2007 in Sumedang, West Java) was a sophomore student of Institute of Home Affairs Governance (Institut Pemerintahan Dalam Negeri, abbreviated as IPDN), who died as a result of being beaten by his seniors during hazing. He was a member of the North Sulawesi contingent. His death has invoked critics from the public as the institute has allowed seniority in the form of violence towards the junior students to happen under the pretext of discipline.

An autopsy and investigation found Muntu had bruises on several of his organs from a beating by five senior students. Four have since been expelled.

The case has attracted nationwide attention of the Indonesian media as well as high-level officials in the Indonesian government, particularly because this is the 35th death in the school since 1993, as revealed by the whistleblower: a suspended IPDN professor Inu Kencana. President Susilo Bambang Yudhoyono has appealed to totally demilitarise the school in order to break the cycle of violence.
