= Cunnilingus in Halacha =

Rabbinic views on cunnilingus

Within the guidelines of Halacha, as presented by Chazal and early Rabbinic authorities, the discussion revolves around oral-vulvar stimulation in Halacha (also known as נשיקת אותו מקום, lit. "kissing of that place"). It explores whether or not a man may orally stimulate his wife's vulva (cunnilingus) independent of whether this stimulation does or does not result in her achieving orgasm.

The discussion is within the exclusive framework of a halachically permitted marital relationship and only during the time that one's wife is not in her Niddah state.

== Chazalic views ==
Talmud Bavli (Nedarim p. 20b) quotes the majority of rabbis (who disagree with the fringe view of Yohanan Ben Dahabai) who are lenient by stating that "all that man desires to do with his wife he may" (provided she agrees). The Talmud goes on to bring a parable of a man who makes a meat or fish purchase, that he may cook his purchase in any way he desires.

In a varying text of kallah rabthi as printed in "battei medrashoth" Rabbi Werthheimer notes the significance of the Talmud quoting both meat and fish in its parable;

Since the Torah forbids cooking one's meat in milk, a parable quoting just meat would not suffice as meat has this restrictive element whereas fish has a lesser restrictive element, thus implying that man has an enhanced level of (sexual) freedom with his wife.

The Rambam takes a somewhat lenient approach that permits oral-vulvar stimulation but at the same time discourages its actual practice.

=== During ovulation ===
A stringent view of oral-vulvar stimulation when a woman may conceive is presented in Kallah Rabthi, one of the minor tractates in the name of Rabbah:

Rabbah said...he let go of his mouth that talks that within it was given the power to kiss and kissed the closed (i.e. the vagina that cannot kiss or talk) therefore the mouth of his offspring will have closed mouths..this applies only if she conceives from that (specific) sexual-relation

— Kallah Rabthi, ch. 1

== Regarding the Kohen ==
The Sifthei Kohen (vol. 2 p. 244) commentary to the Torah points out that the kohen personality is to be extra-scrupulous with oral-vulvar stimulation of his wife when producing offspring, as per Rabbi Yochanan's ben Dhabai's warning that it may cause a physical blemish were his wife to conceive; as a kohen is bounded by the Torah rules of kohanic disqualifications, and may be disqualified from specific Bet HaMikdash services if he has a physical blemish.

== Views of the Achronim ==
Shulchan Aruch (Orach Hayyim ch. 240) takes a stringent view of oral-vulvar stimulation by stating that the transgressor violates the spirit of the Torah verses of והצנע לכת ("Thou shalt walk humbly" -Micah 6:8) and בעבור תהיה יראתו על פניכם לבלתי תחטאו ("So that fear (of God) should be on your faces so that you should not sin" -Exodus 9:16) and of בל תשקצו את נפשותיכם ("Thou should not make your soul despicable" -Leviticus 20:25).

== Leniencies ==
The Remah's glosses to Shulchan Aruch (Even HaEzer ch. 25) adopt a more lenient view on oral-vulvar stimulation, as does Rabbi Yoel Sirkus (the "Bach") who permits it in accordance with halacha, but nonetheless discourages its practice.

Rabbi A. Arbel in his work "Ba'athi Legani" points out that the Rambam disagrees that oral-vulvar stimulation violates the spirit of the verse of בל תשקצו, as the average person – during sexual excitement – is not disgusted at the notion of orally stimulating the vulva.

A similar point of view is written by Rabbi Shlomo Blumenkrantz who states that the Remah, Chelkath Mechokek and the Aruch HaShulchan all agree that one may do with his wife as one desires – including oral-vulvar stimulation – as this is not punishable according to bare-basic halacha. However, his brother, Rabbi Avrohom Blumenkrantz, author of Gefen Porioh, explicitly forbids oral sex.

== See also ==
- Fellatio in Halacha
- Foreplay
- Islamic views on oral sex
- Oral sex
