= Fellatio in Halacha =

Rabbinic views on fellatio

Within the guidelines of halacha, as presented by chazal and early rabbinic authorities, fellatio is classified as ביאה דרך איברים (penetration by way of the limbs) or מעשה חידודים בעלמא (general acts of sharpening).

Peripheral halachic discussion of the topic revolves upon whether a husband may engage in varying sexually-gratifying acts with his wife – including fellatio – performed up to ejaculation. The opinions below use the term biyah sheloh kedarka in their original Hebrew text, which refers to anal sex, not any form of extra-vaginal ejaculation. This distinction is very important, as these same authorities do in fact prohibit ejaculation through other forms of extra-vaginal sex, such as oral sex, etc. Oral sex, up until ejaculation, is entirely permitted according to most Talmudic and halachic authorities although ejaculation should only take place within the vagina.

The discussion includes the opinion of the permitting authorities limiting their permit to specific frequencies and timings, the consensus being that any halachic-permit ("hetter") is solely applicable within the exclusive framework of a Torah-permitted marital relationship and strictly during the time that one's wife is not in her niddah state.

== Maimonides ==
In the original Hebrew text of the Mishneh Torah of Maimonides, he takes a lenient approach that permits all that a man desires to do with his wife. The presentation omits the customary prohibition on extracting semen in vain, which HaRav Yossef Qafih quarantines as an addition by a subsequent unknown editor. Maimonides' commentary to the Mishnah likewise hints at a lenient stance.

== On occasion ==
Chazal have in certain instances permitted intentional extra-vaginal ejaculation in tandem with one's wife. Tosefot cites the opinion of Rabbi Yitzchak (Isaac ben Samuel) who permits an occasional complete anal ejaculation with one's wife on condition that one does not accustom himself to always doing so (Tosfoth, Yebamoth 34b; Tosfoth, Sanhedrin 58b). The Bayit Chadash (Yoel Sirkis) commentary to the Rabbeinu Asher (ibid.) explicitly permits this foreign ejaculation with Rabbeinu Asher siding with the Tosafist opinion. This opinion is likewise quoted in Tur Shulchan Aruch, Even Ha'ezer ch. 25.

The Bayis Chodosh sourced his views based on the Talmudic tract of Yebamoth;

It isn't comparable to the action of Er and Onan only if one is accustomed to doing so all the time, but if it is performed on occasion when he desire his wife for non-vaginal relations—it is permitted ...as whatever a man desires to do with his wife he may as per the (chazalic) parable of meat that is acquired from the butcher and fish from the fisherman (Tractate Nedarim, 20b)

— Hagahot HaBach to Tractate Yebamoth 34b

Thus Rabbenu Asher, followed by Rabbi Elijah Spira, commented that an occasional anal ejaculation in tandem with one's wife is not considered "extracting semen in vain" (and not banned by the Talmud) as long as the intention is not to avoid impregnating one's wife and it is done on occasion, as this is not likened to the desire of Onan who wished to avoid impregnating Tamar entirely. The Aguddah work also sides with the lenient opinion permitting an occasional extra-vaginal ejaculation with one's wife, whilst Rabbi Samuel Eidels (the Maharsha) likewise taking a lenient view.

== Parable of meat and fish ==
In a varying text of Kallah Rabthi as printed by Rabbi Solomon Aaron Wertheimer in "Battei Medrashoth", Rabbi Werthheimer notes the significance of the Talmud quoting both meat and fish in its parable depicting the enhanced permissiveness of sexually gratifying activities that one may perform with his wife.

Since the Torah forbids cooking one's meat in milk, a parable quoting just meat would not suffice as meat has this restrictive element whereas fish has a lesser restrictive element, thus implying that man has an enhanced level of (sexual) freedom with his wife.

== As often as needed ==
A more explicit permissive stance is that of the tosafist rabbi Isaiah di Trani the Elder who hints that a complete extra-vaginal ejaculation is permitted whenever needed to "seat" one's desire with the stark exclusion being to avoid pregnancy;

What was the (forbidden) action of Er and Onan that the torah prohibits? that committed with the intent of not diminishing her beauty (due to pregnancy) and he doesn't desire to fulfill the mitzvah of procreation (פרו ורבו) with her. But if his intent.. is for his inclination and to satisfy his desire and his intent is not to avoid impregnating her, it is permitted, ..he whose intent is to fulfill the desire of his inclination does not transgress as "all that a man wants to do with his wife he may do" (Tractate Nedarim, 20b) -and this isn't called "wasting his seed"

— Tosfoth Ri"d to Tractate Yebamoth, p. 12b (Yad HaRav Herzog, Jerusalem)

Rabbi Isaiah the Elder's view is likewise echoed by his descendant, Rabbi Isaiah di Trani the Younger.

Rabbi Eleazar of Worms, in his recently published Torah commentary to the verse "Adam and his wife, and were not embarrassed" (Genesis) permits any activity with one's wife necessary to "quiet (lit. seat)" his desire.

=== Active participation ===
Later rabbinic authorities differentiated between masturbation (self-extracting semen in vain) and an extra-vaginal ejaculation achieved with the active participation of one's Torah-permitted partner—with the former being forbidden under most if not all circumstances. Apparently, any halachic permit for an extra-vaginal ejaculation must be accompanied by the active participation of one's wife.

== See also ==
- Cunnilingus in Halacha
- Fellatio in Islam
- Judaism and masturbation
- Oral sex
- Oral suction
