= Circle jerk =

Group male masturbation

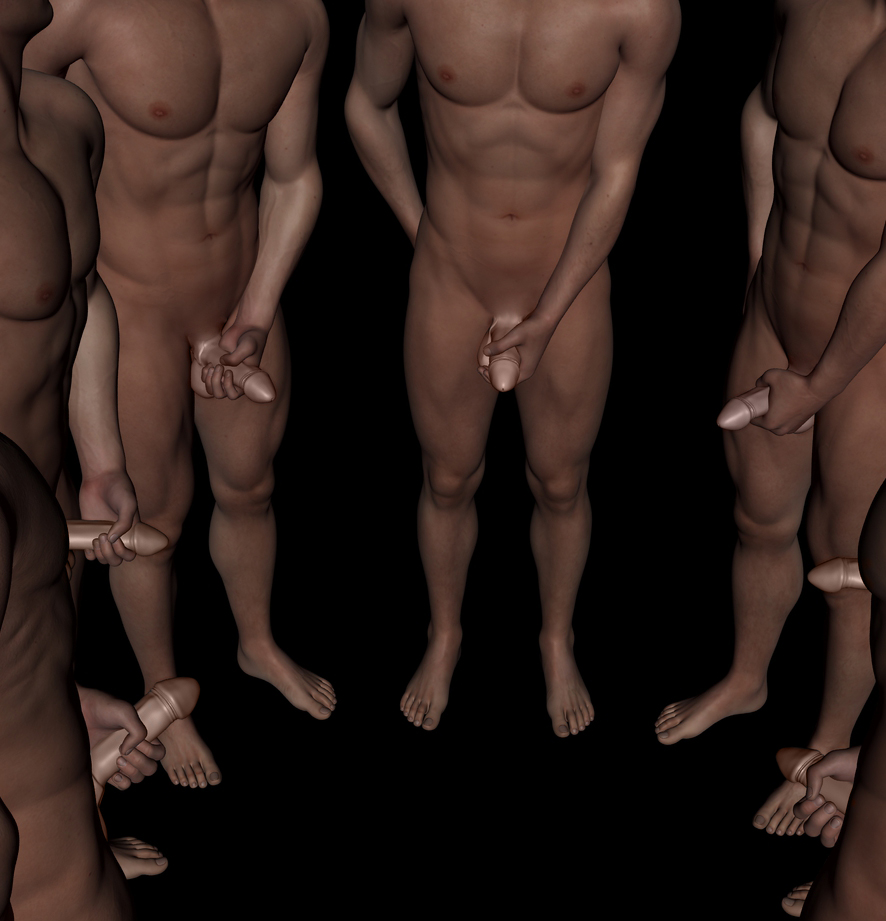
Simulated representation of a circle jerk involving adult males

A circle jerk, also sometimes spelled circlejerk, is a sexual practice in which a group of men form a circle and masturbate or touch each other's genitals. The term circle jerk is also used to refer to self-congratulatory behavior.

Circle jerks often feature a competitive element, with the "winner" being the participant able to ejaculate first, last, or farthest depending on the pre-established rules. They can serve as an introduction to sexual relations with other males, or as a sexual outlet at an age or situation when regular sexual activity with another person is not possible.

While circle jerks feature a homoerotic element, some analysts interpret adolescent boys' group activities such as circle jerks as an effort to establish heterosexual, masculine dominance within the group. American sociologist Bernard Lefkowitz states that what actually motivates participation is the desire for friends to witness and acknowledge one's sexual prowess, helping to counter teenage feelings of inadequacy related to sexual activity.

== Non-literal meaning ==
In a figurative sense, the term is used to refer to self-congratulatory behavior or discussion among a group of people, usually in reference to a "boring or time-wasting meeting or other event". On Reddit, the term is used to mock self-congratulatory behavior and circular discussions. BuzzFeed News described /r/circlejerk as a "subreddit devoted to the mockery of all of Reddit's various vanities, sanctimonies, and canards," and New York magazine reported that "any sufficiently popular subreddit eventually spawns a 'circlejerk' counterpart in which users mock the host subreddit".

== See also ==
- Bukkake
- Echo chamber (media)
- Group sex
- Soggy biscuit
