= Fetish =

Fetish or fetishism most often refers to:

- Fetishism, the attribution of religious or mystical qualities to inanimate objects, known as fetishes
- Sexual fetishism, a sexual attraction to objects or body parts

Fetish or fetishism may also refer to:

== Religion and mysticism ==
- Fetishism, the attribution of religious or mystical qualities to inanimate objects, known as fetishes
  - Zuni fetishes, small carvings from various stones made by the Zuni Indians
  - Imiut fetish, in ancient Egypt, a stuffed, headless animal skin tied by the tail to a pole
  - Fetish priest, in countries of West Africa, a person who serves as a mediator between the spirit and the living

== Sexuality ==
- Sexual fetishism, a sexual attraction to objects or body parts
  - Fetish subculture, a social movement constructed around sexual fetishism
  - Fetish art, depiction of sexual fetishes

== Arts and media ==
- Fetish (Joan Jett and the Blackhearts album), 1999
- Fetish (Lolita Milyavskaya album), 2008
- "Fetish" (song), 2017, by Selena Gomez
- Fetish, a superheroine in the Bomb Queen series
- Fetish (Devil May Cry), a low-class demon in the video game Devil May Cry
- The Great Fetish, a science fiction novel by L. Sprague de Camp
- Growth Fetish, a 2003 book by Clive Hamilton advocating a zero-growth economy among "developed" nations

== Other uses ==
- Commodity fetishism, a Marxist concept of valuation in capitalist markets
- Venturi Fétish, an electric sports car produced by Venturi

== See also ==
- Fétiche, French artist
