= Tribute (sexual act) =

Ejaculation on images of someone

A tribute, or cum tribute, is a sexual activity that involves masturbating and/or ejaculating on the picture of a person. Originating as an online sex game, this act has gained recent coverage for its use in cyberbullying as a way to spite, intimidate a victim or achieve sexual satisfaction over them with impunity.

== Definition ==
A tribute consists of ejaculating on a portrait, and then recording the portrait and the semen together. Tributes often circulate in dedicated online communities composed mostly of men. Sometimes, they take the form of a video, which are known as hatewank or tribute videos depending on the context. Some tributes can feature men or random objects as targets. More commonly, the targets are women, either real or fictional. Tributed individuals can range from celebrities, to semi-public individuals like journalists, to low-profile individuals like the tributer's partner. It can be considered as a form of fetish activity.

== Origins ==
A 2022 Vice article frames tributes as a form of bukkake-by-proxy, as both portray multiple men ejaculating on one woman. The sexual practice of bukkake originates in 1980s Japan as an alternative sex act that developed due to censorship of genitals in Japanese pornography.

Around 2006, the term was slang among porn actors. At the time, it was considered a form of online sex game. As with the general definition of tribute, the act involves the target, usually a woman, soliciting tribute images online and aims to get the most replies from men browsing.

== Use in cyberbullying ==
Starting with the Gamergate controversy, tributes have gained notoriety as a way for male communities to spite female targets. In those contexts, the images are taken from the target's social media. Victims have described feeling guilt after being subject to tributes. Cyberbullying through tributes seeks to shame the victim into leaving social media and can be combined with other forms of harassment like doxing. Such tributes often occur in group settings with internal discussion involving mockery of the victim. The superficial homage given to such tributes conflicts with their knowingly non-consensual production. Target pictures are often taken from casual settings and casting them in an explicit way serves to cause further torment to the victim. Such media of the victims in a sexual setting often cannot practically be removed from circulation.

=== Motive and sociological explanation ===
British law professor Clare McGlynn suggests that the search for social status and the need for bonding motivates men to participate in tribute communities. Non-consensual tributes are sometimes fueled by a desire to silence or degrade women that are in public life, or to express an anti-feminist stance. Alternatively, non-consensual tributes are described as a tool to satisfy sexual or fetishistic desires with impunity.

=== Legal challenges ===
As with deepfake pornography, non-consensual tributes are considered challenging to address legally since they are often created using publicly available social media images. Some false communications offense legislation exists in the United Kingdom to address tributes. Harassment or cyberbullying often co-occurring with non-consensual tributes are easier to pursue legally. The creators of tributes often remain anonymous due to the ease of creating them. Tributes targeting minors are also difficult to track and prosecute, with local police departments declining such cases due to a lack of resources. In the United States, there is no federal legislation regulating tributes or revenge pornography, hindering enforcement of local laws across state lines.

== See also ==
- Phone sex
