= Money shot =

Particularly expensive or valuable cinematic sequence

A money shot is a moving or stationary visual element of a film, video, television broadcast, or print publication that is disproportionately expensive to produce or is perceived as essential to the overall importance or revenue-generating potential of the work.

== Origin and cinematographic senses ==
William Safire identifies the use of the word "money as a modifier meaning 'powerful, decisive'" as far back as 1949 ("money hits" in baseball), and possibly to 1890 (a "money player" in billiards). By 1977 the phrase had entered American usage as slang for the cum shot in a pornographic film: that is, a shot of the male actor ejaculating outside his partner. This is the filmed moment that the audience has paid money to see.

According to Steven Ziplow, author of The Film Maker's Guide to Pornography (1977), "There are those who believe that the come shot, or, as some refer to it, 'the money shot', is the most important element in the movie and that everything else (if necessary) should be sacrificed at its expense." In her book Hard Core, Linda Williams argues that the money shot is not simply desired in and of itself, but proves to the audience that the sex is real.

In contrast, film critic Jane Mills (2001) contends that money shot was "originally mainstream filmmakers' slang for the image that cost the most money to produce," and only later transitioned to mean the image desired by the audience, the image that makes the money (and thus, finally, to its pornographic connotation).

In its broader cinematographic sense, a money shot (also called a money-making shot) is a provocative, sensational, or memorable sequence in a film, on which the film's commercial performance is perceived to depend. The scene may or may not be a special-effects sequence, but may be counted on to become a selling point for the film. For example, in an action thriller, an expensive special-effects sequence of a dam bursting might be considered the money shot of the film. Many filmmakers read a script and look for the most dramatic or climactic moment—the money shot—in the proposed film. Even though the costs or technical challenges of filming such an impressive scene may be huge, producers and directors will do whatever it takes to get that shot completed.

== Extended senses ==
More broadly, the term money shot can refer to any notably dramatic or emotional footage.

- On a television talk show, the money shot may be a visibly emotional scene, such as a guest's tearful confession of a previously well-kept secret or their dramatic retelling of a traumatic experience.
- In broadcast journalism, the money shot which grabs or holds viewers' attention may be a photograph of a person in an unusual, noteworthy, tragic, embarrassing, or incriminating situation, or thrilling footage of a disaster such as a tsunami rolling into a city. A money shot is typically one that would be difficult to set up or anticipate in advance; therefore amateur footage is disproportionately represented among money shots.
- In surveillance, the phrase money shot often refers to the specific image or footage in which the perpetrator commits the act; that is, in which the perpetrator is caught in flagrante delicto. Compare smoking gun.
- In broadcast or print journalism, the money shot may be a photograph that in itself drives an important percentage of the sales of the publication. The pursuit of titillating photographs of celebrities in unusual or embarrassing situations is known as paparazzo journalism. In print journalism, the Pulitzer Prize for Breaking News Photography rewards the production of unique and iconic photographs.
- In an even broader metaphorical sense, the money shot in a basketball three-pointer shooting competition is the fifth and last ball in the rack, which is worth twice as many points as any other ball.
