= Cindy Patton =

American sociologist and historian (born 1956)

Cindy Patton (born February 12, 1956) is an American sociologist and historian specializing in the history of the AIDS epidemic. A former faculty member at Temple University and Emory University, she currently teaches at Simon Fraser University, where she held the Canada Research Chair in Community, Culture, and Health from 2003 to 2014. Her work has appeared in Criticism, the Feminist Review, and the International Review of Qualitative Research, and she co-edited a special edition of Cultural Studies on French sociologist Pierre Bourdieu.

Patton is a graduate of Appalachian State University, Harvard University, and the University of Massachusetts. She received the Stonewall Book Award in 1986 for her book Sex and Germs: The Politics of AIDS, and was nominated for a Lambda Literary Award in 1991 for Inventing AIDS.

== Bibliography ==
- Sex and Germs: The Politics of AIDS (1985)
- Making It: A Woman's Guide to Sex in the Age of AIDS (1987) (with Janis Kelly)
- Inventing AIDS (1990)
- Women and AIDS (1993)
- Last Served?: Gendering the HIV Pandemic (1994)
- Fatal Advice: How Safe-Sex Education Went Wrong (1996)
- Cinematic Identity: Anatomy of a Problem Film (1997)
- Queer Diasporas (2000) (as editor with Benigno Sánchez-Eppler)
- Globalizing AIDS (2002)
- Cinematic Identity: Anatomy of a Problem Film (2007)
- Global Science/Women's Health (2008) (as editor with Helen Loshny)
- Rebirth of the Clinic: Places and Agents in Contemporary Health Care (2010) (as editor)
- L.A. Plays Itself / Boys In The Sand : A Queer Film Classic (Queer Film Classics) (2014)

== See also ==
- Joshua Gamson
