= Bukkake =

Sex act and pornography genre

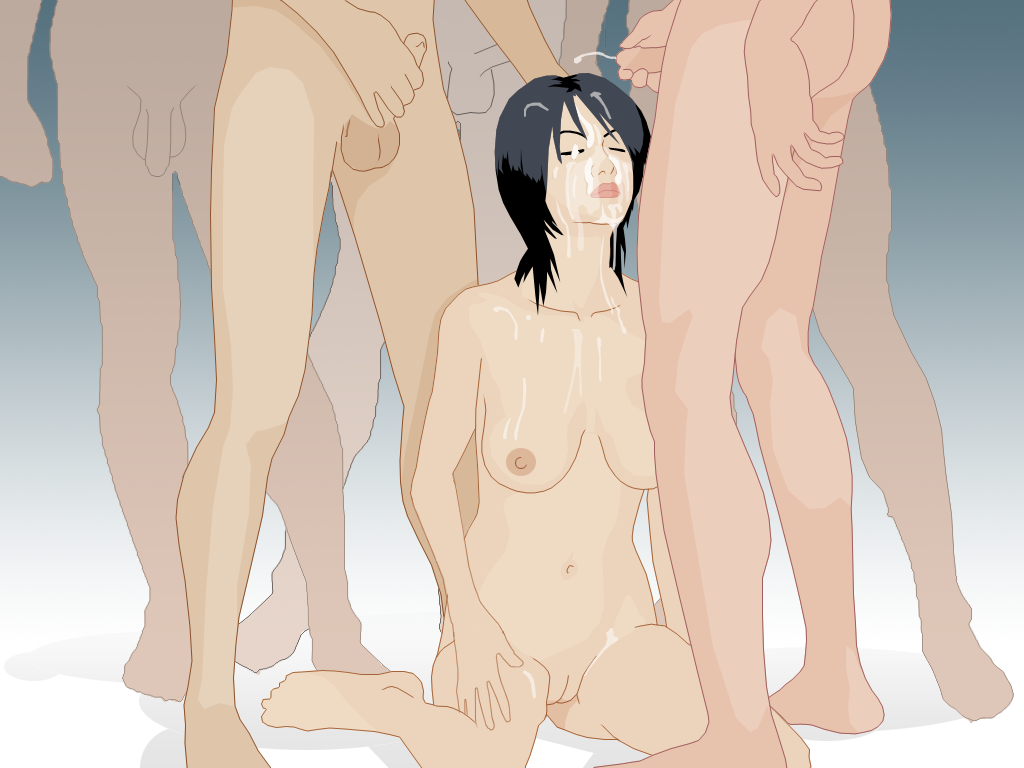
An illustration depicting bukkake

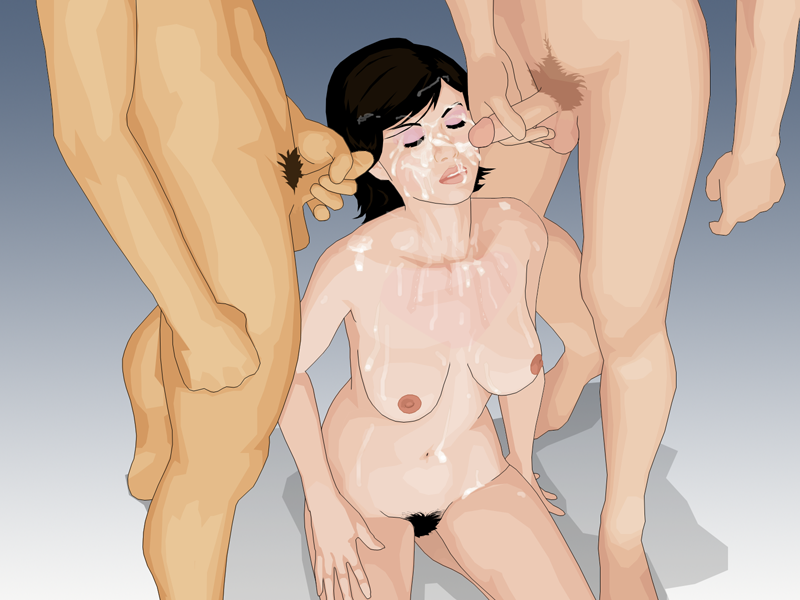
A pair of men ejaculating on a single woman's face.

Bukkake (Japanese: ぶっかけ; [bɯkkake]; English: /bʊˈkɑːkeɪ, bʊˈkɑːki/ buu-KAH-kay, buu-KAH-key or English: /bʊˈkækeɪ/ buu-KAK-ay) is a sex act in which multiple males ejaculate on one person. It is often portrayed in pornographic films. (Note: Attributed to multiple sources:)

Originating in Japan in the 1980s, the genre subsequently spread to North America and Europe, and crossed over into gay pornography.

== Etymology ==
Bukkake is the noun form of the Japanese verb bukkakeru (ぶっ掛ける, to dash or sprinkle water), and means "to dash", "splash", or "heavy splash". The compound verb can be decomposed into a prefix and a verb: butsu (ぶつ) and kakeru (掛ける). Butsu is a prefix derived from the verb "buchi", which literally means "to hit", but the usage of the prefix is a verb-intensifier.

Kakeru in this context means to shower or pour. The word bukkake is often used in Japanese to describe pouring out a liquid with sufficient momentum to cause splashing or spilling. Bukkake is used in Japan to describe a type of dish where hot broth is poured over noodles, as in bukkake udon and bukkake soba.

== History ==
Bukkake was first represented in pornographic films in the mid-to-late 1980s in Japan. One source named Jesus Clits Superstar part 1 released in 1987 and directed by Saki Goto as the first Japanese pornographic movie with 10 facials. According to one commentator, a significant factor in the development of bukkake as a pornographic form was the mandatory censorship in Japan where genitals must be pixelated by a "mosaic". One consequence of this is that Japanese pornography tends to focus more on the face and body of actresses rather than on their genitals. Since film producers could not show penetration, they sought other ways to depict sex acts without violating Japanese law, and since semen did not need to be censored, a loophole existed for harder sex scenes.

The first usage of the word bukkake in a pornographic film title was Bukkake Milky Showers 01 by Shuttle Japan, released in 1995. According to Shiruou, an early Shuttle Japan employee, actor, and owner of the bukkake label Milky Cat, the term crossed over into Western usage when the English language site bukkakebath.com appeared in 1998 using stolen content from Shuttle Japan. However, the popularization of the act and the term for it have been credited to the director Kazuhiko Matsumoto in 1998. The Japanese adult video studio Shuttle Japan registered the term "ぶっかけ/BUKKAKE" as a trademark (No. 4545137) in January 2001.

The practice spread from Japan to the United States and Europe in the late 1990s. The first US bukkake-themed film was American Bukkake 1, by JM Productions released in 1999. The appearance of bukkake videos was part of a trend towards "harder" pornography in the 1990s, preceded by a fashion for double penetration videos in the mid-1990s and occurring in parallel to the appearance of gang bang videos towards the end of that decade. There was an economic advantage for Western pornographers to produce bukkake films since they only require one actress, and often amateur male performers whose pay rates are low. However, Western-style bukkake videos differ in some aspects from those in Japan; in Japanese bukkake videos, female performers are frequently dressed as office ladies or in school uniforms. They are being humiliated, whereas women in Western-style bukkake videos are portrayed as enjoying the scene. Another Japanese variant of bukkake is gokkun, in which several men ejaculate into a container for the receiver to drink. Bukkake is less popular than some other porn niches in the West, possibly because the implicit subordination of the woman does not appeal to many consumers, and because cum shots are normally the climax of a scene, rather than the main events.

The genre has also spread to gay pornography, featuring scenes in which several men ejaculate on another man. "Lesbian bukkake" videos are also produced. The 17th World Congress of Sexology in Montreal in July 2005 included a presentation on bukkake.

More recently, cum tributes have been compared to bukkake since both involve multiple men ejaculating towards a single woman.

== Dangers ==
Getting semen in the eyes can cause sting, burn and intense pain, because the semen contains components which irritate the ocular tissue. The reaction can be tearing, sensitivity to light, redness and blurry vision. The eye can be rinsed with clean water, the tears also help to flush out the semen, after which the discomfort will subside.

Bukkake is one of the sexual practices with the highest risk of infection with sexually transmitted diseases (STDs), as spraying the receiving partner with semen is only possible without a condom, and any pathogens present in the ejaculate of those participating in the same event could then enter the recipient's body via the mucous membranes of the mouth and eyes.

If the person ejaculating has chlamydia in their semen, the receiving partner may contract chlamydial conjunctivitis.

== Reception ==
American editor and publisher Russ Kick, quoting a sexologist, states that men enjoy a "sense of closure and finality about sex", something that watching other men ejaculate provides. The viewer identifies with the ejaculating men, experiencing a sense of vicarious pleasure.

A number of authors have described bukkake as premised on humiliation. Forensic psychologist Karen Franklin has described bukkake as symbolic group rape, characterising its primary purpose as the humiliation, degradation and objectification of women. Lisa Jean Moore and Juliana Weissbein view the use of ejaculation in bukkake as part of a humiliation ritual, noting that it generally does not involve any of the female participants experiencing orgasm. Gail Dines describes the money shot of a man ejaculating on the face or body of a woman, taken to a new extreme in bukkake through the involvement of multiple men, as "one of the most degrading acts in porn".

Tristan Taormino, feminist author and sex educator, has likened bukkake to a "gay circle jerk", noting the inconsistency between its billing as a heterosexual practice and the fact that it features a group of naked men standing in close proximity to each other, masturbating together.

Phillip Vannini, associate professor in the School of Communication and Culture at Royal Roads University, quotes "self-proclaimed net sex commentator" George Kranz, who views recent American interpretations of bukkake as a "significant advance in human behaviour", emphasising the lively, almost party-like atmosphere of American bukkake videos compared to the more subdued Japanese style.

== See also ==
- Facial
- Mating press
- Pornography in Japan
