= Ingestion of semen in humans =

Spoon containing 3.5 mL of human semen, a typical quantity of ejaculate.

Ingestion of semen (semen ingestion or spermatophagy) is the act of orally consuming semen, most commonly occurring in sexual contexts but also documented in certain cultural, ritual, and historical settings.

The practice has been described across a range of societies and belief systems, where it may carry symbolic, social, or erotic significance. Modernly, semen ingestion most frequently is associated with the oral sex act of fellatio, and is discussed in relation to sexual behavior and preferences.

Anthropological and historical accounts describe instances in which semen consumption has been imbued with spiritual or developmental meaning, particularly in initiation rites or esoteric religious traditions. Contemporary discussions may situate the practice within the broader study of human sexuality, including its prevalence, motivations, and highly prevalent depiction in pornography.

== Nutrition and taste ==
Semen is of nominal nutritional value, with a typical ejaculation producing relatively little benefit relative to normal food consumption; nutritionally beneficial substances are found at such low levels that ingestion of a large amount would be required to obtain any health benefit. The most nutritious aspect of semen is that it contains an estimated 7% of the daily recommended supply of zinc.

The taste of semen is commonly described as mild and variable, with reports ranging from slightly salty or bitter to faintly sweet. The taste and nutrition profile can be affected by individual diet. For example, one long held belief has been that eating pineapple improves the taste of semen; this belief reportedly has some basis in science due to the acidity of pineapple balancing the naturally alkaline pH of the semen.

Cookbooks have been written containing recipes for cooking with semen, and lauding its culinary properties.

== Sexual practices ==
Swallowing semen is a relatively common conclusion to the act of fellatio.

According to some surveys and anecdotal accounts, many people who perform fellatio choose to swallow the semen after ejaculation. One informal survey reported approximately 79% of women swallowing semen after oral sex, with the remaining portion including those who spit for reasons including disliking the taste or texture, or finding the act of spitting erotic. Reasons for swallowing include liking the taste or texture of semen; wanting to pleasure or give a sense of intimacy to the partner; avoiding mess associated with external ejaculation; and eliminating any risk of pregnancy.

=== In pornography ===
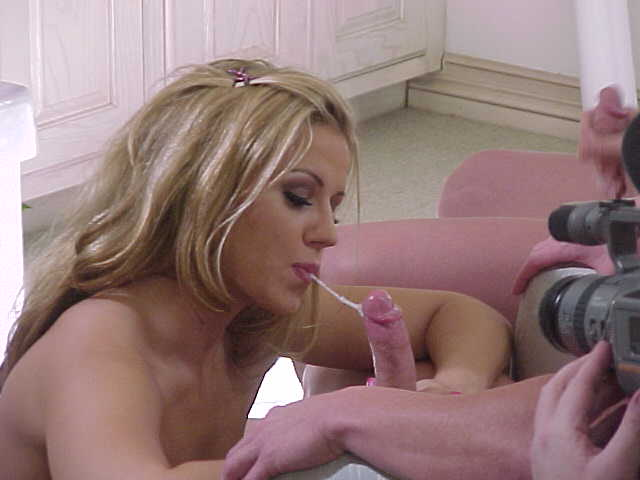
Pornographic film scene with a string of semen from one performer's mouth to another performer's penis

Swallowing semen is a frequent pornography trope, though viewer preferences vary and some content analyses show higher prevalence of oral/external ejaculation in videos compared to actual viewer reported preferences for such acts. A common practice in pornography is for the giving partner to open their mouth in order to display the semen inside it, and then to close their mouth and swallow, and open their mouth again to show that it has been swallowed. Visible displays of semen in this way are elemental to what researchers have identified as the fetishization of semen in pornography as a proof of legitimate male pleasure, with one study observing: "even when male performers ejaculate within the female performer’s mouth… the pornographic script often demands that the female performer make the semen visible, letting it spill out of her mouth… as evidence that the male climax indeed occurred".

Although commonly depicted, some research suggests that viewers, particularly female viewers, do not prefer such displays, and further that "Some, particularly ones who found male semen unattractive, even saw mouth ejaculations as a relatively elegant way (when the female performer swallows the semen) to avoid watching the semen altogether". Some viewers indicated feeling that the act of swallowing semen indicated acceptance or affection on the part of the swallowing performer towards the other.

=== Less common practices ===
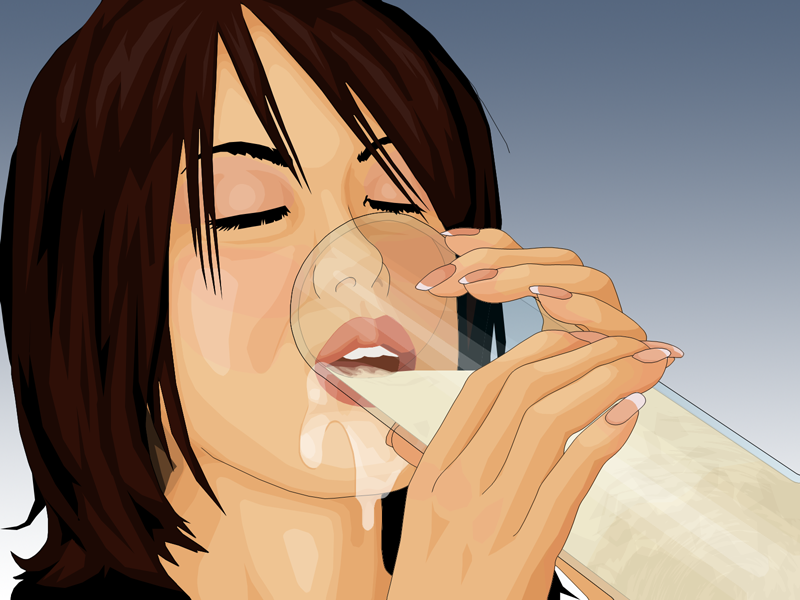
An illustration of gokkun

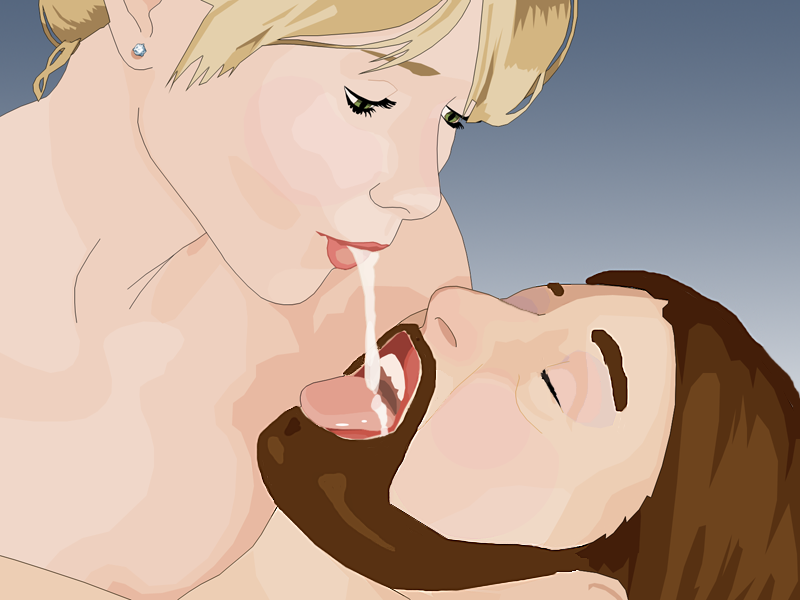
An Illustration of snowballing

Several less common sexual practices similarly involve the ingestion of semen, which may be done with one or more partners. Practices involving the oral intake of semen include:

- Felching is a sexual practice involving the act of sucking semen out of the anus of one's partner. According to the entry for "felch" in the Oxford English Dictionary, the earliest occurrence of the word in print appears to have been in The Argot of the Homosexual Subculture by Ronald A. Farrell in 1972, although this usage was as a synonym for anilingus.
- Gokkun (ごっくん) is a Japanese term for sexual activity in which a person, usually a woman, consumes the semen of one or more men, often from some kind of container. "Gokkun" can also refer to the sexual act of swallowing semen after performing fellatio or participating in a bukkake. The word "gokkun" is onomatopoetic, and translates roughly as the English word "gulp", the sound made by swallowing.
- Cum swapping (snowballing, snowdropping) is the sexual practice in which one person takes someone's semen into their mouth and then passes it to the mouth of the person who ejaculated the semen, usually through kissing. The term was originally used only by gay and bisexual men. Researchers who surveyed over 1,200 gay or bisexual men at New York LGBT community events in 2004 found that around 20% said they had engaged in snowballing at least once. In mainstream pornography, cum swapping depicts performers passing semen from their mouth into that of another performer.

== Spiritual practices ==
The Borborites, also known as the Phibionites, were an early Christian Gnostic sect during the late fourth century AD whose alleged practices involving sacred semen are described by the early Christian heretic-hunter Epiphanius of Salamis in his Panarion. Epiphanius claims that the Borborites had a sacred text called the Greater Questions of Mary, which contained an episode in which, during a post-resurrection appearance, Jesus took Mary Magdalene to the top of a mountain, where he pulled a woman out of his side and engaged in sexual intercourse with her. Then, upon ejaculating, Jesus drank his own semen and told Mary, "Thus we must do, that we may live." Upon hearing this, Mary instantly fainted, to which Jesus responded by helping her up and telling her, "O thou of little faith, wherefore didst thou doubt?" This story was supposedly the basis for the Borborite Eucharist ritual, in which they allegedly engaged in orgies and drank semen and menstrual blood as the "body and blood of Christ" respectively. Bart D. Ehrman, a scholar of early Christianity, casts doubt on the accuracy of Epiphanius's summary, commenting that "the details of Epiphanius's description sound very much like what you can find in the ancient rumor mill about secret societies in the ancient world".

In some cultures, semen is considered to have special properties associated with masculinity. Several tribes of Papua New Guinea, including the Simbari and the Etoro, traditionally believe that semen promotes sexual maturation among the younger men of their tribe. To them, semen possesses the manly nature of the tribal elders, and in order to pass down their authority and powers, younger men of their next generation must fellate their elders and ingest their semen. Prepubescent and postpubescent males were required to engage in this practice. This act may also be associated with the culturally active homosexuality throughout these and other tribes. In Baruya culture, there is a secret ritual in which boys give fellatio to young males and drink their semen, to "re-engender themselves before marriage". In recent decades Simbari boy insemination, along with other traditional practices involving a hierarchical and antagonistic view towards women, have ended in favor of schooling and more equal relationships between men and women.

== Risks ==
Some risks accompany ingestion of semen, including the potential to be exposed to sexually transmitted infections, with pathogens potentially entering the body via the mucous membranes of the mouth. In general, saliva has the ability to clear HIV from semen, but there is still a reduced risk of infection, especially in cases where an individual has unhealthy gums or if they brushed their teeth less than an hour prior to ingesting the semen.

Additionally, there is the possibility of having or developing an allergy to some component of semen itself, or an allergy to something that becomes introduced to the semen such as peanut proteins if the person eats peanuts.

As late as 1976, some doctors were advising women in the eighth and ninth months of pregnancy not to swallow semen lest it induce premature labor, but it was later determined to be safe.

== See also ==
- Ingestion of blood
- Ingestion of urine
