= List of global manpower fit for military service =

The following list projects the total number of people around the globe that are eligible for military service. The estimates are drawn from demographic projections in the CIA World Factbook as of 2009. As defined by the U.S. Central Intelligence Agency, "fit for military service" means all citizens of a country (both male and female) between the ages of 16 and 49 that are not otherwise disqualified for health reasons.

Country	Males	Females	Total
Afghanistan	4,371,193	4,072,945	8,444,138
Albania	800,665	768,536	1,569,201
Algeria	8,317,473	8,367,005	16,684,478
American Samoa	13,875	13,517	27,392
Andorra	18,617	17,613	36,230
Angola	1,467,833	1,411,468	2,879,301
Anguilla	2,955	3,308	6,263
Antigua and Barbuda	17,271	19,586	36,857
Argentina	8,264,853	8,268,498	16,533,351
Armenia	642,734	729,047	1,371,781
Aruba	20,287	21,232	41,519
Australia	4,341,591	4,179,659	8,521,250
Austria	1,607,456	1,576,335	3,183,791
Azerbaijan	1,727,464	1,944,260	3,671,724
Bahamas, The	50,764	51,690	102,454
Bahrain	171,004	144,555	315,559
Bangladesh	24,946,041	31,409,069	56,355,110
Barbados	58,596	58,866	117,462
Belarus	1,720,049	2,069,898	3,789,947
Belgium	1,962,409	1,905,178	3,867,587
Belize	56,135	54,732	110,867
Benin	1,279,053	1,292,438	2,571,491
Bermuda	12,496	12,486	24,982
Bhutan	150,210	135,991	286,201
Bolivia	1,666,697	1,906,396	3,573,093
Bosnia and Herzegovina	991,953	959,226	1,951,179
Botswana	341,190	315,588	656,778
Brazil	38,043,555	44,267,520	82,311,075
Brunei	92,543	95,301	187,844
Bulgaria	1,351,312	1,381,017	2,732,329
Burkina Faso	2,197,557	2,191,978	4,389,535
Burma	9,146,312	9,520,852	18,667,164
Burundi	1,124,072	1,102,729	2,226,801
Cambodia	2,673,383	2,763,256	5,436,639
Cameroon	2,645,601	2,574,948	5,220,549
Canada	6,647,513	6,413,748	13,061,261
Cape Verde	84,967	90,154	175,121
Cayman Islands	9,735	10,145	19,880
Central African Republic	552,907	512,611	1,065,518
Chad	1,103,006	1,315,620	2,418,626
Chile	3,573,165	3,523,649	7,096,814
China	314,459,083	296,763,134	611,222,217
Colombia	8,212,944	10,045,435	18,258,379
Comoros	125,747	135,707	261,454
Congo, Democratic Republic of the	8,925,355	9,047,356	17,972,711
Congo, Republic of the	538,202	527,649	1,065,851
Cook Islands	2,334	2,286	4,620
Costa Rica	971,224	936,978	1,908,202
Cote d'Ivoire	3,122,106	2,936,391	6,058,497
Croatia	770,798	849,957	1,620,755
Cuba	2,532,495	2,468,631	5,001,126
Cyprus	165,615	159,362	324,977
Czech Republic	2,095,038	2,011,531	4,106,569
Denmark	1,013,223	998,837	2,012,060
Djibouti	55,173	52,825	107,998
Dominica	15,821	15,291	31,112
Dominican Republic	2,056,774	1,921,836	3,978,610
Ecuador	2,708,470	3,165,489	5,873,959
Egypt	18,490,522	17,719,905	36,210,427
El Salvador	1,201,290	1,547,278	2,748,568
Equatorial Guinea	105,468	107,919	213,387
Eritrea	834,018	887,495	1,721,513
Estonia	216,483	260,408	476,891
Ethiopia	11,078,847	12,017,073	23,095,920
Faroe Islands	9,759	8,311	18,070
Fiji	192,363	204,410	396,773
Finland	962,479	920,297	1,882,776
France	12,087,606	11,811,260	23,898,866
French Polynesia	65,408	64,421	129,829
Gabon	195,519	190,519	386,038
Gambia, The	238,454	253,680	492,134
Gaza Strip	312,003	297,380	609,383
Georgia	908,282	959,290	1,867,572
Germany	15,747,493	14,899,416	30,646,909
Ghana	3,849,113	3,840,083	7,689,196
Gibraltar	5,234	5,242	10,476
Greece	2,067,878	2,050,289	4,118,167
Greenland	10,809	11,437	22,246
Grenada	20,483	20,923	41,406
Guam	37,563	36,083	73,646
Guatemala	2,401,297	2,725,572	5,126,869
Guernsey	12,447	12,566	25,013
Guinea	1,396,278	1,435,387	2,831,665
Guinea-Bissau	194,110	200,660	394,770
Guyana	150,307	144,622	294,929
Haiti	1,518,840	1,530,043	3,048,883
Honduras	1,397,938	1,402,398	2,800,336
Hong Kong	1,421,406	1,543,443	2,964,849
Hungary	1,887,755	1,934,019	3,821,774
Iceland	62,576	61,159	123,735
India	237,042,868	243,276,310	480,319,178
Indonesia	52,997,922	52,503,046	105,500,968
Iran	17,658,573	17,148,290	34,806,863
Iraq	6,203,425	6,065,009	12,268,434
Ireland	857,162	854,416	1,711,578
Isle of Man	14,691	14,338	29,029
Israel	1,474,966	1,404,712	2,879,678
Italy	11,197,487	10,574,250	21,771,737
Jamaica	573,520	586,426	1,159,946
Japan	22,757,136	21,920,703	44,677,839
Jersey	16,920	16,826	33,746
Jordan	1,593,919	1,382,097	2,976,016
Kazakhstan	2,888,931	3,550,014	6,438,945
Kenya	5,935,480	5,662,755	11,598,235
Kiribati	18,129	20,643	38,772
Korea, North	4,104,964	4,492,374	8,597,338
Korea, South	10,991,263	10,356,604	21,347,867
Kosovo	428,685	388,848	817,533
Kuwait	935,525	519,854	1,455,379
Kyrgyzstan	1,083,777	1,229,406	2,313,183
Laos	1,023,205	1,085,197	2,108,402
Latvia	410,374	463,144	873,518
Lebanon	948,765	954,663	1,903,428
Lesotho	267,083	240,868	507,951
Liberia	387,417	382,334	769,751
Libya	1,466,578	1,409,684	2,876,262
Liechtenstein	6,584	6,801	13,385
Lithuania	677,689	743,468	1,421,157
Luxembourg	95,840	94,641	190,481
Macau	122,962	148,809	271,771
Madagascar	3,150,043	3,404,988	6,555,031
Malawi	1,732,621	1,562,107	3,294,728
Malaysia	5,493,946	5,409,524	10,903,470
Maldives	138,746	82,247	220,993
Mali	1,649,772	1,579,601	3,229,373
Malta	80,186	76,426	156,612
Marshall Islands	13,041	13,199	26,240
Mauritania	450,289	544,598	994,887
Mauritius	277,690	282,211	559,901
Mayotte	35,849	34,456	70,305
Mexico	22,541,654	25,149,027	47,690,681
Micronesia, Federated States of	21,845	23,401	45,246
Moldova	877,665	987,356	1,865,021
Monaco	5,495	5,406	10,901
Mongolia	706,774	740,550	1,447,324
Montenegro	154,029	136,847	290,876
Montserrat	1,126	1,226	2,352
Morocco	7,779,589	7,881,024	15,660,613
Mozambique	2,366,897	2,209,764	4,576,661
Namibia	329,614	294,490	624,104
Nauru	2,592	2,966	5,558
Nepal	4,886,103	5,525,764	10,411,867
Netherlands	3,224,790	3,143,096	6,367,886
Netherlands Antilles	46,461	47,325	93,786
New Caledonia	48,288	48,959	97,247
New Zealand	837,553	825,981	1,663,534
Nicaragua	1,277,878	1,339,413	2,617,291
Niger	2,019,553	2,046,906	4,066,459
Nigeria	19,763,535	18,850,650	38,614,185
North Macedonia	444,247	427,556	871,803
Northern Mariana Islands	19,209	33,074	52,283
Norway	888,219	863,255	1,751,474
Oman	675,454	563,890	1,239,344
Pakistan	33,690,322	32,602,910	66,293,232
Palau	5,177	3,936	9,113
Panama	705,160	710,521	1,415,681
Papua New Guinea	1,110,175	1,127,758	2,237,933
Paraguay	1,363,746	1,390,799	2,754,545
Peru	5,920,716	6,359,803	12,280,519
Philippines	19,169,298	20,636,853	39,806,151
Poland	7,898,892	7,888,035	15,786,927
Portugal	2,103,558	2,049,032	4,152,590
Puerto Rico	699,784	790,482	1,490,266
Qatar	318,388	136,841	455,229
Romania	4,542,720	4,604,484	9,147,204
Russia	21,098,306	27,968,883	49,067,189
Rwanda	1,452,768	1,456,207	2,908,975
Saint Barthelemy	1,594	1,340	2,934
Saint Helena	1,586	1,600	3,186
Saint Kitts and Nevis	8,159	8,517	16,676
Saint Lucia	32,094	36,110	68,204
Saint Martin	6,336	6,925	13,261
Saint Pierre and Miquelon	1,427	1,406	2,833
Saint Vincent and the Grenadines	22,975	22,250	45,225
Samoa	43,169	40,957	84,126
San Marino	5,343	6,048	11,391
São Tomé and Príncipe	35,216	38,329	73,545
Saudi Arabia	7,486,622	5,652,819	13,139,441
Senegal	2,038,508	2,207,510	4,246,018
Serbia	1,415,007	1,379,541	2,794,548
Seychelles	19,702	19,780	39,482
Sierra Leone	692,469	762,239	1,454,708
Singapore	1,033,961	1,104,952	2,138,913
Slovakia	1,165,470	1,152,941	2,318,411
Slovenia	402,484	390,559	793,043
Solomon Islands	121,368	122,821	244,189
Somalia	1,301,026	1,351,649	2,652,675
South Africa	7,641,557	6,518,793	14,160,350
Spain	8,139,020	7,899,157	16,038,177
Sri Lanka	4,498,667	4,693,895	9,192,562
Sudan	5,836,971	5,942,043	11,779,014
Suriname	107,367	111,000	218,367
Swaziland	124,132	118,570	242,702
Sweden	1,705,746	1,645,070	3,350,816
Switzerland	1,510,259	1,475,993	2,986,252
Syria	4,360,934	4,344,895	8,705,829
Taiwan	5,106,730	5,008,563	10,115,293
Tajikistan	1,428,218	1,603,779	3,031,997
Tanzania	5,473,552	5,493,188	10,966,740
Thailand	13,086,106	14,126,398	27,212,504
Timor-Leste	230,534	238,610	469,144
Togo	929,395	943,967	1,873,362
Tonga	26,471	27,715	54,186
Trinidad and Tobago	276,224	271,677	547,901
Tunisia	2,569,403	2,489,651	5,059,054
Turkey	17,223,506	16,995,299	34,218,805
Turkmenistan	1,024,884	1,147,714	2,172,598
Turks and Caicos Islands	4,937	4,648	9,585
Tuvalu	2,462	2,631	5,093
Uganda	3,996,597	3,899,717	7,896,314
Ukraine	7,056,742	9,234,591	16,291,333
United Arab Emirates	2,081,491	788,632	2,870,123
United Kingdom	12,123,900	11,616,769	23,740,669
United States	59,764,677	59,437,663	119,202,340
Uruguay	708,545	693,622	1,402,167
Uzbekistan	6,340,446	6,559,769	12,900,215
Vanuatu	41,533	42,837	84,370
Venezuela	5,391,582	5,873,563	11,265,145
Vietnam	19,190,676	20,768,508	39,959,184
Virgin Islands, British	5,979	5,738	11,717
Virgin Islands, U.S.	17,820	21,193	39,013
Wallis and Futuna	3,273	3,297	6,570
West Bank	545,653	515,102	1,060,755
Western Sahara	52,267	59,221	111,488
Yemen	3,733,704	3,773,626	7,507,330
Zambia	1,364,173	1,245,220	2,609,393
Zimbabwe	1,198,727	1,436,232	2,634,959

== See also ==
- Military service
- Enlistment age by country
- Demography
