= Military service =

Performing the service in the armed forces of a state

No armed forces No enforced conscription Active conscription system, but less than 20% of the people who are fit for the service are conscripted Conscription No information

Military service is service by an individual or group in an army or other militia, air forces, and naval forces, whether as a chosen job (volunteer) or as a result of an involuntary draft (conscription).

Few nations, such as Israel, require a specific amount of military service from every citizen, except for special cases, such as limitation determined by a military physical or religious belief. Most countries that use conscription systems only conscript men; a few countries also conscript women. For example, Chad, Cuba, Eritrea, Israel, and North Korea conscript both men and women. Currently, four countries conscript women and men on the same formal conditions: Norway, Sweden, Denmark and the Netherlands (in the latter conscription is suspended during peacetime). Some nations with conscription systems do not enforce them.

Nations which conscript for military service typically also rely on citizens choosing to join the armed forces as a career.

Some nations with armed forces do not conscript their personnel (e.g. most NATO and European Union states). Instead, they promote military careers to attract and select recruits; see military recruitment.

Some, usually smaller, nations have no armed forces at all or rely on an armed domestic security force (e.g. police, coast guard).

== World summary ==
In this summary, 195 countries are included.

=== No enforced conscription ===
The following 106 countries and territories have been identified as having no enforced conscription:

- Afghanistan
- Albania
- Antigua and Barbuda
- Argentina
- Australia
- Bahamas
- Bahrain
- Bangladesh
- Barbados
- Belgium
- Belize
- Bhutan
- Bosnia and Herzegovina
- Botswana
- Brunei
- Bulgaria
- Burkina Faso
- Burundi
- Cameroon
- Canada
- Cambodia
- Central African Republic
- Chile (none only if quota is met)
- China (de facto, Both compulsory and voluntary military service de jure)
- Comoros
- Congo
- Czech Republic
- Djibouti
- Dominican Republic
- Ecuador
- Eswatini
- Ethiopia
- Fiji
- France
- Gabon
- Gambia
- Ghana
- Germany (none only if quota is met)
- Guinea
- Guyana
- Haiti
- Honduras
- Hungary
- India
- Indonesia
- Iraq
- Ireland
- Italy
- Ivory Coast
- Jamaica
- Japan
- Kenya
- Kosovo
- Lebanon
- Lesotho
- Liberia
- Luxembourg
- Madagascar
- Malawi
- Maldives
- Malta
- Mauritania
- Montenegro
- Namibia
- Nepal
- Netherlands
- New Zealand
- Nicaragua
- Nigeria
- North Macedonia
- Oman
- Philippines
- Pakistan
- Papua New Guinea
- Peru
- Poland
- Portugal
- Romania
- Rwanda
- Saint Kitts and Nevis
- San Marino
- Saudi Arabia
- Serbia
- Seychelles
- Sierra Leone
- Slovakia
- Slovenia
- Somalia
- South Africa
- Spain
- Sri Lanka
- Suriname
- Syria
- Tanzania
- Timor-Leste
- Togo
- Tonga
- Trinidad and Tobago
- Uganda
- United Kingdom
- United States (de facto, Can use The Article One, Section 8 of the Constitution to impose conscription in emergencies)
- Uruguay
- Yemen
- Zambia
- Zimbabwe

=== Both compulsory and voluntary ===
The following countries and regions have been identified as having both compulsory and voluntary military service:

- Bermuda
- Cape Verde
- Colombia
- Democratic Republic of the Congo
- Jordan
- Kuwait
- Mali
- Russia
- Singapore
- Sweden
- Thailand
- Taiwan

=== Selective conscription ===
The following 13 countries have been identified as having selective conscription:

- Benin
- Brazil
- Cape Verde
- Chad
- El Salvador
- Equatorial Guinea
- Guinea-Bissau
- Laos
- Mali
- Mexico
- Niger
- Senegal
- Vietnam

=== Civilian, unarmed or non-combatant service option ===
The following fifteen countries have been identified as having a civilian, unarmed or non-combatant service optional alternative to compulsory military service:

- Angola
- Austria (9 months civilian, 6 months armed)
- Belarus (3 years civilian, 18 months or 1 year armed)
- Cyprus (18 months civilian, 14 armed)
- Denmark
- Estonia
- Lithuania
- Finland (1 year civilian, unarmed 9 months or 1 year, armed 6, 9 months or 1 year)
- Iran (22 months including 2 months of armed training)
- Mexico
- Norway
- Paraguay
- Russia
- Sweden
- Switzerland (1 year civilian, 245 days armed)

=== Compulsory for both genders ===
- Cape Verde (2 years selective)
- Chad (3 years for men. 1 year for women. Civilian service for the age of 21)
- Cuba (2 years for both genders)
- Eritrea (Indefinite period, usually up to 10 years for women and 15 years for men)
- Israel (3 years for men and 2 years for women)
- Morocco (1 year)
- Myanmar
- North Korea (10 years for men, upon high school completion to 23 years of age, for women, 7 years)
- Norway (19 months, selective)
- Sweden

=== Limited to 1 year or less ===
The following twenty-five countries have been identified as having compulsory military service limited to 1 year or less:

- Algeria (1 year)
- Bolivia (1 year)
- Brazil (9 months-1 year, can be extended to a max of 7 years; the conscript may be discharged by excess of contingent)
- Colombia (1–2 years depending on MOS and branch)
- Croatia (2 months)
- Estonia (8–11 months)
- Greece (6 months-1 year)
- Guatemala (1–2 years)
- Kazakhstan (1 year)
- Kyrgyzstan (1 year)
- Latvia (11 months)
- Lithuania (9 months)
- Malaysia (45 days)
- Moldova (1 year)
- Mongolia (1 year)
- Morocco (1 year)
- Paraguay (1 year for Army, 2 years for Navy)
- Qatar (4 months-1 year)
- Russia (1 year)
- Sweden (9–11 months)
- Taiwan (1 year)
- Tunisia (1 year)
- Turkey (6 months-1 year)
- Ukraine (3–5 months of basic military training)
- Uzbekistan (1 year)

=== Limited to 18 months ===
The following 11 countries have been identified to having compulsory military service limited to 18 months or less:

- Azerbaijan (between 1 and 2 years)
- Belarus (6 months-1 year for undergraduate school alumni)
- Benin
- Cambodia
- Cyprus (18 months civilian, 14 armed)
- Egypt (14 months service minimum obligation)
- Georgia
- Kuwait
- Latvia
- Laos
- UAE (16 months for high school diploma holders)

=== Longer than 18 months ===
The following 25 countries have been identified as having compulsory military service terms longer than 18 months:

- Armenia (2 years)
- Angola (2 years plus a training period, civilian or non-combatant option available)
- Chad (3 years men, 1 year women. Civil service available only for women)
- Cuba (2 years, both sexes)
- Eritrea (18 months officially (in practice indefinite) for both sexes; see National Service in Eritrea)
- Equatorial Guinea (2 years, selective)
- Guinea-Bissau (2 years, selective)
- Iran (2 years)
- Israel (3 years for men, 2 years for women)
- North Korea (10 years for men, 7 years for women)
- Libya (2 years)
- Mali (2 years, selective)
- Mozambique (2 years, selective)
- Niger (2 years, selective)
- São Tomé and Príncipe (2 years)
- Senegal (2 years, selective)
- Singapore (22 months to 2 years, without regard to Full-Time National Service in the Singapore Civil Defence Force or Singapore Police Force, under the Ministry of Home Affairs)
- South Korea (18 months for Army and Marines, 20 months for Navy, 21 months for Air Force and Social Service, 3 years for special Social Service)
- Sudan (1–2 years, both sexes)
- Tajikistan (2 years)
- Thailand (2 years for involuntarily drafted men,1 year for volunteers, 6 months for diploma)
- Turkmenistan (2 years)
- UAE (3 years, for high school dropouts)
- Vietnam (2 years, selective)
- Venezuela (2 years)

=== No defense force ===
The following 21 countries have been identified as having no defense forces or as having no standing army but having very limited military forces:

- Andorra
- Costa Rica*
- Dominica
- Federated States of Micronesia
- Grenada
- Iceland*
- Kiribati
- Liechtenstein
- Marshall Islands
- Mauritius*
- Monaco*
- Nauru
- Palau
- Panama*
- Saint Lucia
- Saint Vincent and the Grenadines
- Samoa
- Solomon Islands
- Tuvalu
- Vanuatu
- Vatican City

* Countries having no standing army, but having very limited military forces.

== By country ==
=== Non-mandatory ===
Compulsory military service has declined considerably since 1970. A 2016 study finds "that the probability of a shorter military service time is positively associated with smaller country populations, smaller lagged army sizes, increases in primary schooling among young males, and having common law legal origins."

==== Albania ====
Albania had compulsory military service. Albania's armed forces announced an objective to create a professional army by the end of 2010.

==== Argentina ====
Argentina suspended military conscription in 1995 and replaced it with a voluntary military service, yet those already in service had to finish their time in service.

This came as a result of political and social distrust of the military, dwindling budgets which forced the military to induct fewer conscripts every year, the experience of the 1982 Falklands War which proved the superiority of professional servicemen over conscripts and a series of conscription-related brutality scandals which came to a head with the murder of Omar Carrasco, a 20-year-old conscript, at an Army base in 1994 following a brutal disciplinary treatment and torture.

Military conscription has not been abolished; the Mandatory Military Service Law is still in the books and might be enforced in times of war, crisis or national emergency.

Conscription was known in Argentina as la colimba. The word colimba is a composite word made from the initial syllables of the verbs correr (to run), limpiar (to clean) and barrer (to sweep), as it was perceived that all a conscript did during service was running, cleaning and sweeping. Conscripts themselves were known and referred to as "colimbas".

==== Australia ====
Australians participated in the Second Boer War (1899–1902) as volunteer forces. Two conscription referendums were defeated during World War I, and military service during WWI was voluntary (First Australian Imperial Force). Military service was initially voluntary in World War II (Second Australian Imperial Force). Volunteer militia units (part-time civilian soldiers) were to be used only within the Commonwealth of Australia. In 1942, some militia units were deployed to Papua New Guinea, as it was considered part of Australia at that time, to fight the advancing and later withdrawing Japanese invasion army. Various levels of conscription (National Service) were in force during the 1950s, but only for service in Australia during times of conflict. In 1964, compulsory national service for 20-year-old males was introduced under the National Service Act 1964. Australian troops were later deployed in the Vietnam War, with over 500 men killed in action and thousands wounded in action. The Vietnam War was lost on 1 May 1975, over three years after the Australian Defence Force withdrew in late 1971. All forms of conscription were abolished by the Whitlam government in later 1972. Conscription can be reactivated at any time should war break out; first upon mere declaration by the Governor General, followed by final approval 90 days later as a retrospective action by parliament. The defense act of 1903 clearly states this.

==== Barbados ====
Barbados has no conscription. The country has set the minimum age for voluntary recruitment into the Barbados Defence Force at 18. Younger recruits may be conscripted with parental consent.

==== Belgium ====
Belgium suspended conscription on 31 December 1992 by amending the 1962 Law on Conscription, which became applicable only to conscripts drafted in 1993 and earlier. In practice this meant that the law no longer applied to those born in 1975 and later. Since 1 March 1995 the Belgian armed forces consist of professional volunteers only.

==== Belize ====
Belize has set minimum age for voluntary recruitment into the Armed Forces at 18. (According to the Section 16 of the Defense Act of the Defence Ordinance of 1977.) Conscription has never been prescribed in the Defense Act, but is at the Governor General's discretion.

==== Bosnia and Herzegovina ====
Bosnia and Herzegovina abolished compulsory military service as of 1 January 2006.

==== Bulgaria ====
Bulgaria abolished compulsory military service. The last conscripts were sent home on 25 November 2007.

Previously there was mandatory military service for male citizens from 18 to 27 years of age. Duration of the service depended on the degree of education. For citizens studying for or holding a bachelor's degree or higher the service was six months, and for citizens with no higher education it was nine months. The duration of service was two years in 1992, and was dropping steadily, until it was finally abolished.

==== Canada ====
Compulsory service in a sedentary militia was practiced in Canada as early as 1669. In peacetime, compulsory service was typically limited to attending an annual muster, although they were mobilized for longer periods during war. Compulsory service in the sedentary militia continued until the late 19th century when Canada's sedentary Reserve Militia system fell into disuse. The legislative provision that formally made every male inhabitant of military age a member of the Reserve Militia was removed in 1904, replaced with provisions that made them theoretically "liable to serve in the militia".

Conscription into a full-time military service had only been instituted twice by the government of Canada, during both world wars. Conscription into the Canadian Expeditionary Force was practiced in the last year of the First World War in 1918. During the Second World War, conscription for home defence was introduced in 1940 and for overseas service in 1944. Conscription has not been practiced in Canada since the end of the Second World War in 1945.

==== Chile ====
All Chilean men between 17 and 24 years are eligible for military service. Since 2005, military service is voluntary and then mandatory if quotas necessary for the armed forces are not completed. The General Directorate of National Mobilization (In Spanish: Dirección General de Movilización Nacional, or DGMN) is responsible for the recruitment of volunteers and conscripts. Since 1992, according to the Law 19.992, due to the creation of the Corporación Nacional de Reparación y Reconciliación, sons and certain other relatives of victims of human rights violations and/or political violence, during Pinochet's dictatorship, are extempt of the military service draft, that was compulsory at that time. In 2009, with the Law 20.405, more victims were recognised by the Republic of Chile and the exemption of relatives was also amended

==== China ====
At present, military conscription only exists in theory and has done so since the establishment of the People's Republic of China in 1949. Compositional military conscription has never been enforced.

In 1955, the legal basis for conscription in China, the first Military Service Law created a system of compulsory military service. Since the late 1970s, the Chinese conscription laws mandate a hybrid system that combines conscripts and volunteers. The Chinese system operates through a process of draft registration or levy system with recruitment quotas. De jure, military service with the PLA is obligatory for all Chinese citizens. In practice, mandatory military service has not been implemented since 1949 as the People's Liberation Army has been able to recruit sufficient numbers voluntarily.

==== Costa Rica ====
Costa Rica abolished its military in 1948. See Military of Costa Rica.

==== Czech Republic ====
The Czech Republic abolished compulsory military service on 31 December 2004.

==== Ecuador ====
Ecuador's Constitutional Tribunal ruled in June 2007 that compulsory military service was unconstitutional. Military service has been voluntary since 2009.

==== France ====
Modern conscription was invented during the French Revolution, when the Republic wanted a stronger defense and to expand its radical ideas throughout Europe. The 1798 Jourdan Act stated: "Any Frenchman is a soldier and owes himself to the defense of the nation". Thus Napoleon Bonaparte could create afterward the Grande Armée with which he set out on the first large intra-European war.

France suspended peacetime military conscription in 1996, while those born before 1979 had to complete their service; since the Algerian War (1954–62), conscripts had not been deployed abroad or in war zones, except those volunteering for such deployments.

==== Germany ====
On 15 November 2010, the German government voted in favour of suspending universal conscription with the aim of establishing a professional army by 1 July 2011. The last conscripts were drafted on 1 January 2011.

In 2025, amid the Russo-Ukrainian war, the German parliament passed a new law on conscription, aimed at increasing the number of troops, strengthening the German army and also strengthening the defense force across Europe. The law will come into effect on January 1, 2026.

==== Hungary ====
Hungary abolished mandatory military service by November 2004, after the parliament had modified the constitution, ending a long-standing political dispute. To restore drafting, a two-thirds vote in parliament is needed, which is unlikely in the short term. As of 2011, the country is developing a professional army, with strong emphasis on "contract soldiers" who voluntarily serve 4+4 years for a wage.

In December 2011, the National Assembly re-established the possibility of mandatory military service for every male citizen - with Hungarian address - between the age of 18 and the age of 40. Even though drafting is still banned in peacetime, the listing of citizens fit for military service starts in January 2012. According to the legislation, the conscripts can only be drafted in "state of emergency" or as defensive measure, the National Assembly can authorise drafting.

==== India ====
India has never had mandatory military service, either under British rule or since independence in 1947. In WWII the Indian Army became the largest all-volunteer force in history, rising to over 2.5 million men in size. It has since maintained the world's second largest army after China and the world's largest all-volunteer army.

==== Iraq ====
Saddam Hussein's large Iraqi army was largely composed of conscripts, except for the elite Republican Guard. About 20,000-35,000 conscripts died during the First Persian Gulf War, also known as Operation Desert Storm. In the intervening years, Iraq's military suffered from decay and poor leadership, but there was still compulsory service. Note: One of voluntary program was "Ashbal Saddam" known as "Saddam's Cubs" where children were trained to defend Iraq through "toughening" exercises such as firearms training and dismembering live chickens with their teeth. Following the Iraq War where the original military was disbanded, the Iraqi Army was recreated as a volunteer force with training overseen at first by the Coalition Provisional Authority and later by the American presence.

==== Ireland ====
The whole island of Ireland was exempted from UK First World War conscription in 1916, but in April 1918 new legislation empowered the UK government to extend it to Ireland. Although the government never implemented this legislation, it led to a Conscription Crisis in Ireland and politically pushed the country further to seek its independence from the UK. Since independence in 1922, the Irish Defence Forces have always been fully voluntary, and the state's foreign policy includes "military neutrality".

==== Italy ====
Italy had mandatory military service, for men only, until 31 December 2004. The right to conscientious objection was legally recognized in 1972 so that a "non-armed military service", or a community service, could be authorised as an alternative to those who required it.

The Italian Parliament approved the suspension of the mandatory military service in August 2004, with effect starting from 1 January 2005, and the Italian armed forces will now be entirely composed of professional volunteer troops, both male and female, except in case of war or serious international military crisis, when conscription by law can be reactivated.

==== Jamaica ====
In Jamaica the military service is voluntary from 18 years of age up. Younger recruits may be conscripted with parental consent.

==== Japan ====
Conscription was enforced during the Japanese Militarism in Second World War. Japan's Self Defense Forces have been a volunteer force since their establishment in the 1950s, following the end of the Allied occupation.

==== Latvia ====
Latvia abolished compulsory military service on 1 January 2007. They reintroduced it in January 2024.

==== Lebanon ====
Lebanon previously had mandatory military service of one year for men. On 4 May 2005, a new conscription system was adopted, making for a six-month service, and pledging to end conscription within two years. By 10 February 2007 it did.

==== Luxembourg ====
Luxembourg has a military ground force (army) composed of career officers and volunteers. Compulsory military service (conscription) existed between 1944 and 1967.

==== Mauritius ====
Mauritius does not have a standing army but operates a paramilitary service composed of volunteering police officers known as the Special Mobile Force.

==== Montenegro ====
President of Montenegro Filip Vujanović has, as of 30 August 2006, abolished conscription for the military.

==== Netherlands ====
The Netherlands established conscription for a territorial militia in 1814, simultaneously establishing a standing army which was to be composed of volunteers only. However, lack of sufficient volunteers caused the two components to be merged in 1819 into a "cadre-militia" army, in which the bulk of troops were conscripts, led by professional officers and NCOs. This system remained in use until the end of the Cold War. Between 1991 and 1996, the Dutch armed forces phased out their conscript personnel and converted to an all-volunteer force. The last conscript troops were inducted in 1995 and demobilized in 1996. Formally, the Netherlands has not abolished conscription; that is to say, the laws and systems which provide for the conscription of armed forces personnel remain in place, and Dutch citizens can still, theoretically, be mobilized in the event of a national emergency. From 2017, the obligation has been extended to women as well as men.

==== New Zealand ====
Conscription of men into the armed forces of New Zealand came into effect in two periods, from 1912 to 1930 and from 1940 until it was abolished in 1972.

==== North Macedonia ====
North Macedonia abolished compulsory military service as of October 2006.

==== Pakistan ====
Like India, Pakistan has always maintained a purely volunteer military. However, in the immediate aftermath of independence, and the 1948 war; at a time when the army was just reorganising from a colonial force to a new national army; militias raised for service from, the Frontier, Punjab and Kashmir were often raised from locals tribe; each tribe was given a quota and many of the individuals sent did not "volunteer" in the strictest sense (though many did).

==== Panama ====
Panama officially abolished the entire military in 1992, and transformed it into National Police.

==== Philippines ====
Conscription in the Philippines has been implemented at several points in the country's history. As of 2023, no mandatory conscription is in effect in the Philippines and military service is entirely voluntary. It was introduced prior to World War II during the Philippine Commonwealth in 1935 with a term of enlistment of 5 1/2 months. Another instance was during the Presidency of Ferdinand Marcos, where two Presidential Decrees with terms of conscripting trainees into emergency military service were passed. The first was in 1973, with a period of 12 months. The second was in 1974, with a period of 18 months. However, mandatory military service remains a possibility in the Philippines as Section 4, Article II of the Constitution of the Philippines states:

"The Government may call upon the people to defend the State and, in the fulfillment thereof, all citizens may be required, under conditions provided by law, to render personal, military or civil service."

— Section 4, Article II, Constitution of the Philippines

==== Peru ====
Peru abolished conscription in 1999.

==== Poland ====
Poland suspended compulsory military service on 5 December 2008 by the order of the Minister of Defence. Compulsory military service was formally abolished when the Polish parliament amended the conscription law on 9 January 2009; the law came into effect on 11 February 2009.

==== Portugal ====
Portugal abolished compulsory military service on 19 November 2004. Before that, military service was mandatory for all men. From 2004, all 18-year-old Portuguese citizens are, however, required to participate in a national defence day ("Dia da Defesa Nacional"). This applied solely to Portuguese men until 2010 at which point the duty was extended to women as well. Said citizens may request to have their duties waived under one of three main exemptions:

1. Prolonged illness, proven by a medical certificate to that effect;
2. Residence abroad - if the citizen in question has resided abroad for a continuous and permanent period exceeding 6 months, he or she may request a waiver.
3. The completion of military duties in another country - if the citizen has completed military duties for another country, so long as said country is a signatory of the European Convention on Nationality, he or she may request a waiver.

Such requests are not automatic, and must be made to the Director-General of Resources of National Defence ("Diretor-Geral de Recursos da Defesa Nacional") at whose discretion a waiver may be granted.

==== Romania ====
Romania suspended compulsory military service on 23 October 2006. This came about due to a 2003 constitutional amendment which allowed the parliament to make military service optional. The Romanian Parliament voted to abolish conscription in October 2005, with the vote formalising one of many military modernisation and reform programmes that Romania agreed to when it joined NATO.

==== Serbia ====
Serbia abolished compulsory military service on 1 January 2011. Before that, Serbia had compulsory national service for all men aged between 19 and 30. In practice, men over 27 were seldom called up. Service was usually performed after university studies had been completed. The length of service was 12 months, then reduced to 9 months but was reduced to 6 months in 2006. There was also an alternative for conscientious objectors which lasted 9 months. Serbian nationals living outside of the country were still expected to complete national service; however, they could defer it if it would have seriously affected their career in the country where they then resided. This could be done by contacting the embassy in the country of residence (if under 27), or done by contacting the army directly (if over 27).

==== Slovakia ====
Slovakia abolished compulsory military service on 1 January 2006.

==== Slovenia ====
Slovenia's Government of Prime Minister Anton Rop abolished mandatory military service on 9 September 2003.

==== South Africa ====
South Africa under the apartheid system had two years of compulsory military service for white men, followed by camps at intervals. This was abolished in 1994. See End Conscription Campaign.

==== Spain ====
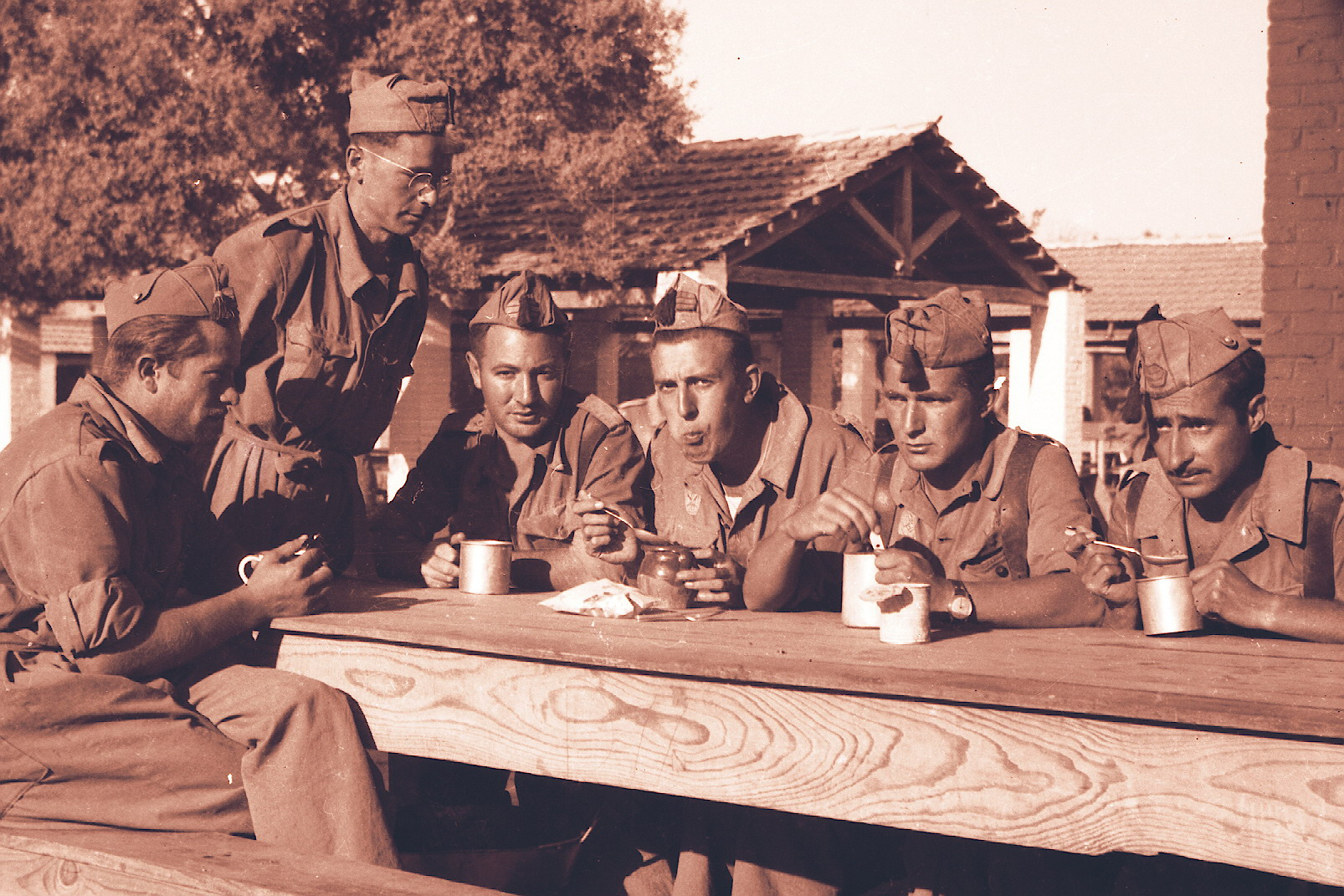
Military service in Spain (1945)

Spain abolished compulsory military service in 2001. Military and alternative service was nine months long and in recent years the majority of conscripts chose to perform alternative, rather than military, service. One of the main reasons for its abolition was the "insubordinate movement".

==== Sri Lanka ====
Sri Lanka has never had mandatory military service, either under British rule or since independence in 1948. It maintains an all-volunteer military.

==== Sweden ====
Military Service was mandatory in Sweden from 1901 until 1 July 2010, when conscription was officially suspended. In 2010, the abolished male-only conscription was replaced with a gender neutral conscription system which went into force in 2018. Until 2010, all Swedish men aged between 18 and 47 years old were eligible to serve with the armed forces over a period ranging from 80 to 450 days. The right to Conscientious Objection was legally recognised in 1920: An alternative community service for conscientious objectors was easily available instead of military service. The number of those seeking conscientious objector status declined as actual conscript recruitment continued to decline. In the years running up to 2010 roughly 6000 - 8000 people out of an annual cohort of 100,000 - 120,000 potential recruits actually completed military service.

==== United Kingdom ====
The United Kingdom historically was the only European state with a volunteer army, and remained so through the first half of World War I. As the war dragged on into deadlocked trench warfare, the number of volunteers dried up, which led the government to introduce conscription under the Military Service Act. The Act exempted the whole of Ireland from conscription, and although an amending Act in 1918 empowered the government to extend conscription to Ireland, the extension was never implemented. Conscientious objectors were formally recognised under the Military Service Act, with the possibilities of absolute exemption from military service, exemption conditional upon performing civilian "work of national importance", or non-combatant service within the Army; some of those who refused the latter alternatives, or engaged in anti-war protests, went to jail. Conscription was ended in 1920.

Military conscription was reintroduced in Britain (Northern Ireland being exempted) in May 1939 in anticipation of World War II. A form of "industrial conscription" was also used to increase output in coal mining (see the "Bevin Boys") and other dimensions of the war effort. Later in the war both forms of conscription were extended in a limited way to women, such as the Women's Land Army to help with agricultural production. Conscientious objectors were treated more leniently than in WWI, but could still go to prison if they refused war-related work. For example, the scientist Kathleen Lonsdale was sentenced to a month in Holloway prison in 1943 for refusing to register for war duties and refusing to pay a resulting fine of two pounds.

Conscription of men into the Armed Forces continued ad hoc from 1945 until the National Service Act 1948 established a system from 1 January 1949 of calling up men in Britain reaching the age of 18 for eighteen months full-time service followed by four years reserve service. In 1950, as a result of the Korean War, full-time service was increased to two years, and reserve service reduced to three and a half years. In 1957, phasing-out of the system was announced, the last men being called up in 1960, and the last conscript being discharged in May 1963, after allowance for deferment of service.

==== United States ====
The United States first introduced conscription during the American Civil War. With insufficient volunteers coming in by 1863, the Lincoln Administration was forced to begin drafting despite widespread complaints that it was unconstitutional and undermined states' rights (some states had conscripted men up to this point, but not the federal government). In July 1863, New York City erupted in the draft riots over the draft. However, anyone could get out by paying a $300 fee or hiring a substitute. Many conscripts and substitutes were criminals or men with debilitating health problems, and thus largely useless. The Confederate government had begun drafting men in early 1862.

Conscription was next used after the United States entered World War I in 1917. The first peacetime conscription came with the Selective Training and Service Act of 1940. When World War II ended, so did the draft. It was quickly reinstated with the Korean War and retained for the next 20 years, especially in the Vietnam War. Active conscription ("the draft") ended in 1973.

In 1979, President Jimmy Carter brought back draft registration. All males up to the age of 26 are required to register with the Selective Service System, whose mission is "to provide manpower to the armed forces in an emergency" including a "Health Care Personnel Delivery System" and "to run an Alternative Service Program for men classified as conscientious objectors during a draft." No one has been prosecuted for violating the conscription law in the USA since 1986, but registration is required for certain benefits such as federal college aid, or in certain states, state college aid, or obtaining a driver's license. Women do not currently register for Selective Service in the United States; however they may still enlist for voluntary service. United States federal law also provides for the compulsory conscription of men between the ages of 17 and 45 and certain women for militia service pursuant to Article I, Section 8 of the United States Constitution and 10 U.S. Code § 246, however the federal governments utility of such militia conscripts is limited by the Constitution to repelling invasions and other service within the territory of the United States.

=== Mandatory ===
==== Armenia ====
Armenia has compulsory military service for two years for males from 18 to 27 years old.

==== Austria ====
In Austria, all able‑bodied male citizens are subject to mandatory military service starting when they reach 18 and ending when they reach 35. Since 2006, the period of service has been six months. Conscientious objectors can join the civilian service (called Zivildienst) for nine months. A 10-month participation in the Austrian Holocaust Memorial Service, the Austrian Social Service, or the Austrian Peace Service is regarded as an equivalent to the civilian service.

Since 1 January 1998, females can join the military service voluntarily. The Austrian conscription referendum, 2013 resulted in the rejection of a proposal that would have ended conscription. Although the referendum was non-binding, both parties in government pledged to honour the results.

==== Azerbaijan ====
Azerbaijan has mandatory military service for all fit men, who are at least at the age of 18. Military service lasts for eighteen months for those without higher education, and for twelve months for those with higher education.

==== Belarus ====
Belarus has mandatory military service for all fit men from eighteen to twenty-seven years of age. Military service lasts for eighteen months for those without higher education, and for twelve months for those with higher education.

==== Brazil ====
Males in Brazil are required to serve 12 months of military service upon their 18th birthday. While de jure all males are required to serve, numerous exceptions mean military service is de facto limited mostly to volunteers, with an average of between 5 and 10% of those reporting for duty actually being inducted. Most often, the service is performed in military bases as close as possible to the person's home. The government does not usually require those planning to attend college or holding a permanent job to serve. There are also several other exceptions, including health reasons, for which one may not have to serve. Recruits accepted at a university may also choose to train under a program similar to the American ROTC, and satisfy their military requirement this way. Direct entrance to one of the military academies will also substitute for this requirement.

==== Myanmar ====
De jure the Burmese junta requires able-bodied persons aged 18 and over to register with local authorities. In 2011, civil servants, students, those serving prison terms, and those caring for an elderly parent were excluded from the draft, but they could be later called to serve. Totally exempt are members of religious orders, disabled persons, and married or divorced women with children. Those who fail to report for military service could be imprisoned for three years, and face fines. Those who deliberately inflict injury upon themselves to avoid conscription could be imprisoned for up to five years, as well as fined.

However, the conscription has never been activated under the military junta which ruled the country from 1988 to 2010. Myanmar's constitution states that male citizens over 18 could be called to serve in military, but it has not been activated either. As of 2013, Myanmar citizens are not required to serve in military.

==== Croatia ====
On 3 October 2007, the government proposed to the parliament of the Republic of Croatia a decision to suspend all compulsory military service. This was supported by President Stjepan Mesić, and after a vote in the Parliament on 5 October 2007, the decision became official. Earlier partial and temporary 3 years long suspension of obligatory military service was introduced in 1997 in the aftermath of the United Nations Transitional Administration for Eastern Slavonia, Baranja and Western Sirmium when members of Serbs of Croatia community from the region were exempt from conscription, although they were permitted to volunteer. Conscription was reintroduced in 2025 under a new system when the Parliament approved it. In 2026, the first group of conscripts was called up for mandatory service.

==== Cyprus ====
Cyprus has compulsory military service for all Greek Cypriot men between the ages of seventeen and fifty. Additionally, from 2008 onwards, all men belonging to the religious groups of Armenians, Latins and Maronites, are no longer exempt, and also serve military service. Before 2016 military service lasted for twenty-four months. After that, former-soldiers are considered reservists and participate in military exercises and training for a few days every year. Conscientious objectors can either do thirty-three months' unarmed service in the army or thirty-eight months' community work In 2016, however, the Cypriot parliament had voted to reduce its mandatory service to 14 months and make up for lost manpower by hiring professional soldiers.

==== Denmark ====
As described in the Constitution of Denmark, § 81, Denmark has mandatory service for all able men. Normal service is four months, and is normally served by men in the age of eighteen to twenty-seven. Some special services will take longer. Danish men will typically receive a letter around the time of their 18th birthday, asking when their current education (if any) ends, and some time later, depending on when, they will receive a notice on when to attend to the draft office to be tested physically and psychologically. However, some may be deemed unfit for service and not be required to show up.

Even if a person is deemed fit, or partially fit for service, he may avoid having to serve if he draws a high enough number randomly. Persons who are deemed partly fit for service will however be placed lower than those who are deemed fit for service, and therefore have a very low chance of being drafted. Men deemed fit can be called upon for service until their 50th birthday in case of national crisis, regardless of whether normal conscription has been served. This right is very rarely exercised by Danish authorities.

Conscientious objectors can choose to instead serve six months in a non-military position, for example in Beredskabsstyrelsen (dealing with non-military disasters like fires, flood, pollution, etc.) or foreign aid work in a third world country.

==== Egypt ====
Egypt has a mandatory military service program for males between the ages of eighteen and thirty. Conscription is regularly postponed for students until the end of their studies, as long as they apply before they turn twenty-eight years of age. By the age of thirty, a male is considered unfit to join the army and pays a fine. Males with no brothers, or those supporting parents are exempted from the service. Former President Sadat added that any Egyptian who has dual nationality is exempted from military service and this is still in effect. Males serve for a period ranging from fourteen months to thirty-six months, depending on their education; high school drop-outs serve for thirty-six months. College graduates serve for lesser periods of time, depending on their education; college graduates with special skills are still conscripted yet at a different rank and at a different pay scale with the option of remaining with the service as a career. Some Egyptians evade conscription and travel overseas until they reach the age of thirty, at which point they are tried, pay a $580 fine (as of 2004), and are dishonorably discharged. Such an offense, legally considered an offense of "bad moral character", prevents the "unpatriotic" citizen from ever holding public office.

==== Estonia ====
From 2003, unit-based training for conscripts was introduced and conscripts began to be called into service in 2 parts: pre-service and main occupation.

The length of military service is often determined by the manner in which the professional is recruited. Those who entered the service in January and July by pre-conscription generally earn 11 months, those who arrived in October 8 months. The final length of service shall be determined by the post to which the soldier is assigned. A member of the Defense Forces shall be appointed to the position after completing a basic course for a soldier or sailor. The recruitment recruits professionals whose posts require 11 months of military service (drivers, specialists, non-commissioned officers and reserve commanders).

==== Finland ====
Finland has mandatory military service for men of a minimum duration of five and half months (165 days); depending on the assigned position: those trained as officers or NCOs serve for eleven and half months (347 days), specialist troops serve for eight and half (255 days) or eleven and half months, while rank and file serve for the minimum period. Unarmed service is also possible, and lasts eight and half months (270 days) or eleven and half (347 days). All males are required to participate in the drafting event (Finnish: kutsunnat) in their municipality of domicile in the year that they turn 18. The fitness for service and the actual induction to the service then takes place at the time and place decided individually for each conscript during the drafting event. The induction takes place usually at the age of 19 but the allowed age range is 18–29. The delayed induction is permissible for serious personal reasons, such as studies, but induction cannot be delayed beyond 29. The military strives to accommodate the wishes of the future conscript when determining the time of induction and the duty location, but these are ultimately determined by the needs of service.

Since 1995, women have been able to volunteer for military service. During the first 45 days, women have an option to quit at will. Having served for 45 days, they fall under the same obligation to serve as men except for medical reasons. A pregnancy during service would interrupt the service but not automatically cause a medical discharge.

Belonging in a sexual minority does not result in an exemption. Transgender individuals usually get their service postponed until they have undergone sex reassignment surgery.

Non-military service of twelve months is available for men whose conscience prevents them from serving in the military. Men who refuse to serve at all are sent to prison for six months or half the time of their remaining non-military service at the time of refusal. In theory, male citizens from the demilitarized Åland region are to serve in customs offices or lighthouses, but since this service has not been arranged, they are always exempted in practice. Jehovah's Witnesses' service is deferred for three years, if they present a written testimony, not older than two months, from the congregation of their status as baptized and active members of the congregation. Jehovah's Witnesses will be exempted from peacetime duty at the beginning of the age 29. Military service has been mandatory for men throughout the history of independent Finland since 1917. Soldiers and civilian servicemen receive a daily allowance of €5 (days 1 – 165), €8.35 (days 165 – 255), or €11.70 (onward from day 255).

Approximately 20% are trained as NCOs (corporals, sergeants), and 10% are trained as officers-in-reserve (second lieutenant). In wartime, it is expected that the officers-in-reserve fulfill most platoon leader and company commander positions. At the beginning of the service, all men go through same basic training of eight weeks. After this eight-week period it is decided who will be trained as NCOs or officers.

Having completed the initial part of the service as a conscript, the soldier is placed in the reserve. Reservists may be called for mandatory refresher exercises. Rank and file serve a maximum of 40 days, specialists 75 days and officers and NCOs 100 days. Per refresher course day, the reservists receive a taxable salary of about fifty euros. The salary depends slightly on the military rank: officers receive €56, NCOs €53 and rank-and file €51 per day. The service is mandatory; it is not possible to refuse an order to attend the refresher exercise, only to apply for a postponement of the service if personal or employer's urgent and non-avoidable needs require this. The postponement is not always granted. If the reservist experiences a crisis of conscience that prevents him or her from further execution of military service, the reservist can apply for civilian service. The civilian service for reservists takes a form of a five-day course at Lapinjärvi Civilian Service Institution. After the course, the reservist is permanently freed of military service during peace and war.

There are no general exemptions for the conscription. The law requires employers, landlords etc. to continue any pre-existing contracts after the service. For medical reasons, exemption or postponing is given by the military authority after an examination by a military or military-appointed doctor. If the disability is expected to be cured, the exemption is temporary, and the service is postponed. If the disability continues until the male turns 25, he is exempted. The basic doctrine is that the great majority of each age cohort serve, and the size of the active army can be adjusted by changing the maximum age of reservists to be called up, instead of using selective service.

The option to military service is civilian service (available to females after completing 45 days of military service), where an individual subject to conscript finds a job at some public institution, where they serve for 11 and half months, the same as the longest rank-and-file service (drivers). Before 2008, the law required 13 months, which was criticized for being punitive internationally by the Human Rights Committee of the United Nations, The European Committee of Social Rights, The Commissioner for Human Rights of the Council of Europe and Amnesty International.

The national security policy of Finland is based on a credible independent defence of all Finnish territory. The maximum number of military personnel abroad is limited to 2,000 (out of the 900,000 available reserve). Contributions to the UN troops comprise only professional soldiers and trained, paid reservists who have specifically applied to such operations. Therefore, no "expeditionary wars" argument can be made against conscription.

Draft dodging is nearly non-existent, as failure to show up to a drafting event immediately leads to an arrest warrant, and the delinquent is brought by the police to either to the drafting event (if still in progress) or to the regional military office for a physical examination and subsequent determination of induction time. Disobeying the induction order also causes the arrest warrant to be issued and is prosecuted as absence without leave, or after five days of absence, as desertion. Proof of military or civil service is generally required to obtain a 5-year passport (some exceptions can apply). Without proof, the passport is valid, at the longest, until the applicant's 28th birthday.

Military rank, either as NCO or reserve officer, is highly valued as a merit in Finland by employers when recruiting a male employee. In general, serving as an NCO or, especially, as a reserve officer, has a clear positive impact on future earnings and achievement of a high career position of the individual.

==== Greece ====
As of 2021, mandatory military service at the Hellenic Army was once again raised to 12 months for all males aged 18–45, unless serving in units in Evros or the North Aegean islands where duration was kept at 9 months.

Some are entitled to reduced service due to serious family reasons (single parent families, parent serving in the army etc.). Although Greece is developing a professional army system, the effort has been postponed significantly. Women are accepted into the Greek army as salaried professionals, but are not obliged to mandatory conscript service. Conscript soldiers receive full health insurance and a nominal salary of €9 per month for privates and €12 for the rank of draft corporal and draft sergeant. There is the option of serving as a non-regular officer designate. In that case the received salary is €569 (with an additional €150 if the cadet is sent far from his home) after basic training is over. The duration of cadet training is roughly 4 months and 9 more months are dedicated for the actual service. Adding the 1 month spent in rookie training, a cadet's conscription will last a total of 14 months. In the last month of his service the cadet takes the rank of second lieutenant. The minimum wage for unskilled workers and professional soldiers stands at around €830 per month in Greece. This results in reservist corporals and sergeants receiving a wage that is 1/70th that of a professional soldier, whom they outrank. This inconsistency was partly dealt with by abolishing the rank of sergeant for conscripts.

===== Conscientious objection to military service in Greece =====
The length of alternative civilian service for conscientious objectors to military service is 15 months. Amnesty International was also concerned that the determination of conscientious objector status fell under the jurisdiction of the Ministry of Defence, which breaches international standards that stipulate that the entire institution of alternative service should have a civilian character. A similar framework was later on developed by the Cyprus National Guard to deal with conscientious objectors.

==== Iran ====
Iran has mandatory military service for men which starts at the age of 18. Women are exempt from military service. Exceptions are made for those who cannot serve because of physical or mental health problems and disabilities, and students can delay service while enrolled at a university. The duration of military service is normally 24 months, but is reduced to 22 months for service in destitute areas and to 20 months for border regions. All servicemen receive two months of military training as part of their service. The initial rank conscripts receive in the military corresponds with their level of educational attainment.

Since 2008 and the formation of Iran's National Elites Foundation (Bonyade Mellie Nokhbegan), students or university graduates who have excelled in their studies or research may be accepted as members of this organization. Members have the option to carry out their military service in the form of a research project lasting no less than 14 months. A 45-day mandatory military training is applicable even for those who are members of Iran's National Elites Foundation.

The Iranian Parliament's National Security Commission is currently debating a plan to abolish conscription and to introduce an alternative plan that would make the army professional.

Exemptions from the Iranian military service, but also military duty in case of war include:

- Girls and women
- Sole son with a father over 70 years old.
- Men who are the sole carers of a disabled or mentally ill parent, sibling, or 2nd line family member.
- Doctors, firefighters and other emergency workers whose uptake for military duty or service jeopardizes local health and emergency services.
- Workers of vital government institutions that assist or indirectly serve the military (exempt at time of war).
- Workers of businesses that serve the military, e.g. factories that produce military equipment (exempt at time of war).
- Homosexuals and transgender individuals.
- Workers of Iranian shipping lines (IRISL Group) and National Iranian Tanker Company.

Prisoners may be excused of their sentence to serve in the military at a time of war or to complete military service in exchange for a reduced sentence dependent on the nature of the crime committed.

Men reaching 19 years old who are not granted exemption from the military service are not able to apply for a passport, any form of employment, leave the country or collect any completed academic certificate.

==== Israel ====
Israel drafts both men and women. All Israeli citizens are conscripted at age 18, with the following exceptions:

- Torah students are presently exempted from service should they so choose. This is a contentious issue in Israel.
- Israeli Arabs are exempt from conscription, although they may volunteer. The men of other non-Jewish communities in Israel, notably the Druze and Circassians, are conscripted; women are not though may volunteer.
- Jewish females, who choose to declare they are unable to serve due to religious observance grounds. Many choose to volunteer in the national service Sherut Leumi.
- Women are not inducted if they are married or pregnant.
- Candidates who do not qualify on grounds of mental or physical health.

Typically, men are required to serve for 3 years, while women for 2 years. Officers and other soldiers in certain voluntary units such as Nahal and Hesder are required to sign on for additional service. Those studying in a "Mechina" (pre-induction preparatory course) defer service until the conclusion of the program, typically one academic year. An additional program (called "Atuda'i") for qualified applicants allows post-secondary academic studies prior to induction.

There is a very limited amount of conscientious objection to conscription into the IDF. More common is refusal by reserve soldiers to serve in the West Bank and Gaza. Some of these conscientious objectors may be assigned to serve elsewhere, or are sentenced to brief prison terms lasting a few months to a year and may subsequently receive dishonourable discharges.

One year after their period of regular army service men are liable for up to 30 days (much less on average) per year of reserve duty ("miluim") until they are in their early forties. Women in certain positions of responsibility are liable for reserve duty under the same terms as men, but are exempt once they are pregnant or with children.

==== Jordan ====
As of 2020, Jordan has reinstated a compulsory year of military service for those that meet the criteria. Unemployed men aged 25 to 29 are the target group of the conscription program.

==== Mexico ====
As of 2011, all males reaching eighteen years of age must register for military service (Servicio Militar Nacional, or SMN) for one year, though selection is made by a lottery system using the following color scheme: whoever draws a black ball must serve as an available reserve, that is, he must not follow any activities whatsoever and get his discharge card at the end of the year. The ones who get a white ball serve Saturdays in a Batallón del Servicio Militar Nacional (National Military Service Battalion) composed entirely of one-year SMN conscripts. Those with a community service interest may participate in Literacy Campaigns as teachers or as physical education instructors. Military service is also (voluntarily) open to women. In certain cities, such as Mexico City and Veracruz, there is a third option: a red ball (Mexico City) and a Blue ball (Veracruz), which entails serving a full year as a recruit in a Paratrooper Battalion in the case of Mexico City residents, or an Infantería de Marina unit (Navy Marines) in Veracruz. In other cities which have a Navy HQ (such as Ciudad Madero), it is the Navy which takes charge of the conscripts, instead of the Army.

A "liberated" military ID is a requirement to join the Mexican local, state, and federal police forces, also to apply for some government jobs, Draft dodging was an uncommon occurrence in Mexico until 2002, since a "liberated" military ID card was needed for a Mexican male to obtain a passport, but since this requirement was dropped by the Mexican government, absenteeism from military service has become more common.

==== Morocco ====
Morocco eliminated compulsory military service as of 31 August 2006, however, this law has been revised, and at 7 February 2019 officially restored compulsory military service. The service takes as long as 12 months in the new law project with a draft targeting Moroccan males and females alike in the age range of 19–25 with an exception for people with a medical or psychological condition, college students can delay the date of their enlistment thus being able to serve at the end of their university course.

==== North Korea ====
Conscription occurs in North Korea despite ambiguity concerning its legal status. Men are universally conscripted while women undergo selective conscription. Conscription takes place at age 17 and service ends at 30. Children of the political elites are exempt from conscription, as are people with bad songbun (ascribed social status in North Korea). Recruitment is done on the basis of annual targets drawn up by the Central Military Commission of the Workers' Party of Korea and implemented locally by schools.

Conscription first began before the Korean War. Initially, under the rule of Kim Il Sung, conscription was largely not necessary because the level of voluntary enlistment was high due to financial rewards. Under Kim Jong Il and Kim Jong Un these rewards have diminished.

==== Norway ====
Norway has mandatory military service of nineteen months for men and women between the ages of 19 (18 in war time) and 44 (55 in case of officers and NCOs). The actual draft time is six months for the home guard, and twelve months for the regular army, air force and navy. In October 2014, Norway extended compulsory military service to women.

The remaining months are supposed to be served in annual exercises, but very few conscripts do this because of lack of funding for the Norwegian Armed Forces. As a result of this decreased funding and greater reliance on high technology, the Armed Forces are aiming towards drafting only 10,000 conscripts a year. As of 2011, an average of 27% of conscripts actually complete military service each year. The remainder, for the most part, either are formally dismissed after medical tests or obtain deferral from the service because of studies or stays abroad.

The Norwegian Armed Forces will normally not draft a person who has reached the age of 28. In Norway, certain voluntary specialist training programs and courses entail extended conscription of one to eight years. Pacifists and conscientious objectors can apply for non-military service, which lasts 12 months.

==== Russia ====
The conscription system was introduced into Imperial Russia by Dmitry Milyutin on 1 January 1874. As of 2008, the Russian Federation has a mandatory 12 months draft. Some examples of how people avoid being drafted are:

- Studying in a university or similar place. All full-time students are free from conscription, but they can be drafted after they graduate (or if they drop out). Graduated students serve one year as privates, but if they have a military education, they have the option to serve two years as officers.
- Persons who continue full-time postgraduate education.
- Getting a medical certificate that shows that a person is unfit for service.
- Having two or more children.

In Russia, all males are liable for one year of compulsory military service up to the age of 27. In 2006, the Russian government and State Duma gradually reduced the term of service to 18 months from 24 for those who will be conscripted in 2007 and to 12 months from 2008 and dropped some legal excuses for non-conscription from the law (such as non-conscription of rural doctors and teachers, of men who have a child younger than 3 years, etc.) from 1 January 2008. Also full-time students graduated from civil university with military education will be free from conscription from 1 January 2008. Allegedly, the amendment on the length of military service was introduced following the case of Andrey Sychyov.

According to the Russian federal law, the Armed Forces, the National Guard, the Federal Protective Service (FSO), the Foreign Intelligence Service (SVR), and civil defence of the Ministry of Emergency Situations (EMERCOM) are considered as military service.

==== Singapore ====
After Singapore gained its sovereign independence as an island-city nation, the NS (Amendment) Act was passed on 14 March 1967, under which all able-bodied male citizens of at least 18 years of age were obliged by law to serve 22–24 months of mandatory national service in the Singapore Armed Forces, the Singapore Police Force, or the Singapore Civil Defence Force to defend and protect the country. Upon completion of the mandatory active full-time NS, they will have reservist in-camp training cycles of up to 40 days annually over a 10-years period upon deployment to operationally-ready reservist units.

The majority of conscripts serve in the SAF due to its larger manpower requirement. In practice, all conscripts undergo basic military training before being deployed to the various military units of the SAF, the Police Force (SPF), or Civil Defence (SCDF). During Basic Military Training, conscripts, known as National Servicemen, are assessed on their leadership capabilities (over and above basic military skills). All capable conscripts will undergo further vocational trainings to their trained roles and appointments for them to gain experience to move up the NS ranks.

Initially, conscripts could not pick and choose their desired or preferred vocations due to manpower constraints and quotas. Since 2016, however, this was changed as, when enlisting, individuals can indicate their preferred vocations. Since 2004, Singapore cut its mandatory military service period of 30 months to between 22 and 24 months, depending on medical health and physical fitness. NSmen make up >80% of its military defense system.

==== South Korea ====
South Korea has mandatory military service of 18 (army, marines), 20 (navy), 21 (air force and civil service), 36 (special civil service) months. There is 3 years alternative for conscientious objectors from 2020 (civil service in prison). In general, with very few exceptions, most South Korean males serve in the military.

Exemptions are granted to Korean male citizens with physical disabilities or whose mental status is unstable or questionable. When a Korean man becomes of legal age, he is required to take a physical check-up to determine whether he is suitable for military service. Any Korean male athlete who has won a medal in the Olympic Games or a gold in the Asian Games is also spared from the obligation.

- Grades 1–3: normal
- Grade 4: special service; given to individuals that fulfill their military duties as a civil worker amongst civilians.
- Grade 5: civil defence during peacetime.
- Grade 6: exemption from military service in both situation.
- Grade 7: re-check-up within two years.

There are some controversies portrayed in Korean media concerning special treatment given to celebrities. In 2002 Yoo Seung-jun, a Korean pop singer, became a naturalized American citizen to avoid his military duty in Korea. For this reason, the South Korean government had banned and deported Yoo from the country. Another recent example is MC Mong, a popular singer/rapper accused of avoiding his military service by having his molar teeth removed. On 11 April 2011, MC Mong was sentenced to a suspended jail term of 6 months, probation for one year, and 120 hours of community service.

===== Compensation =====
'Regulation on Public Servant Compensation', implemented on 1 January 2020. Exchange rate as of 21 February 2023 (₩1301 to $1.00USD) Per month
Private (이등병)	Private first class (일등병)	Corporal (상등병)	Sergeant (병장)
₩408,100 $313.7 (approx)	₩441,700 $339.5 (approx)	₩488,200 $375.3 (approx)	₩540,900 $415.8 (approx)

==== Switzerland ====
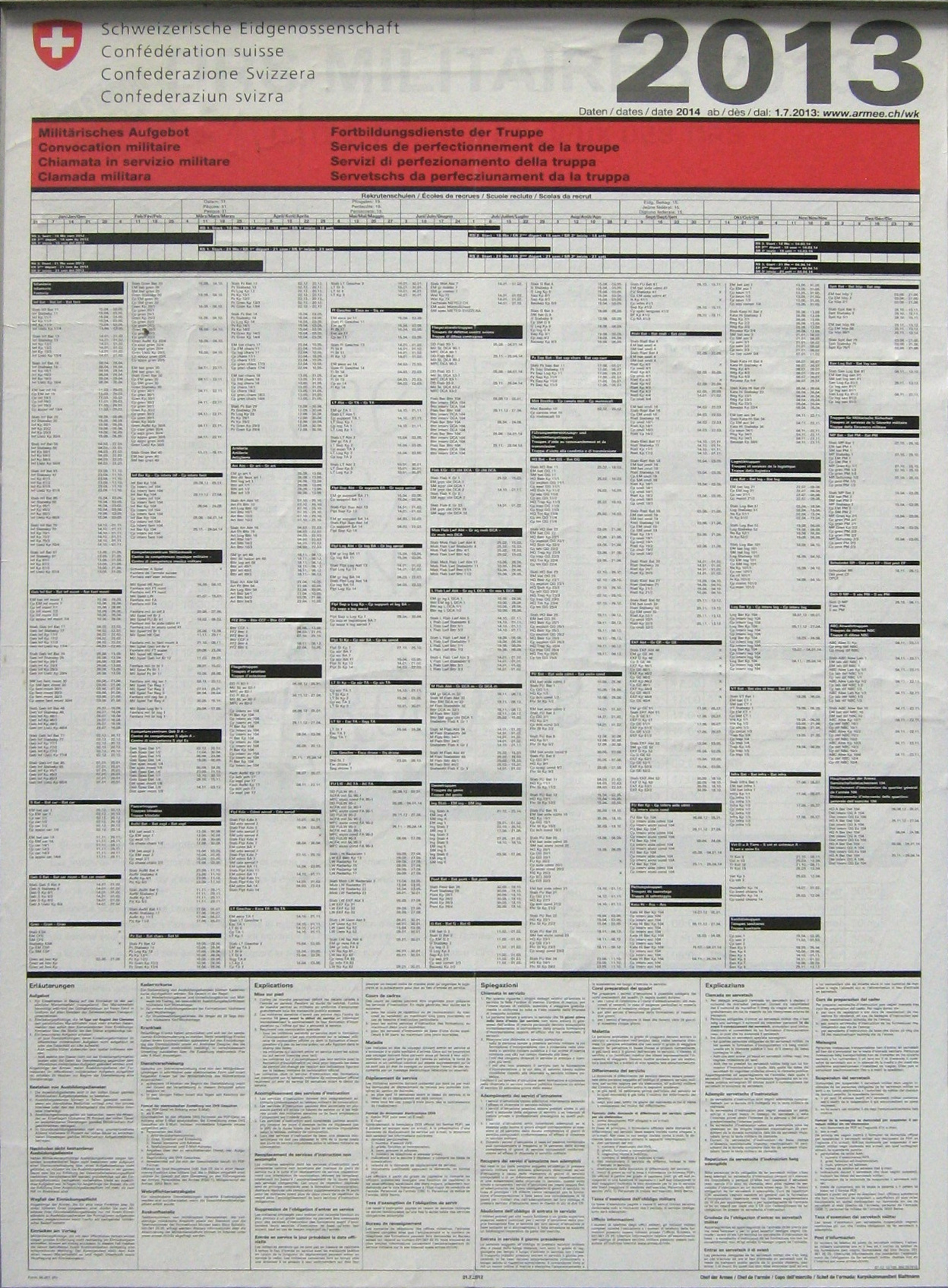
Timetable of military duties, Switzerland

Military service for Swiss men is obligatory according to the Federal Constitution, and includes 18 or 23 weeks of basic training (depending on troop category) as well as annual 3-week-refresher courses until a number of service days which increases with rank (245 days for privates) is reached. (It is also possible to serve the whole requirement at one piece, meaning no refresher courses are required.) Service for women is voluntary, but identical in all respects. Conscientious objectors can choose 390 days of community service instead of military service. Medical deferments and dismissals from basic training lead to about 60% to 65% of Swiss men completing basic training. In 2013, a proposal was created to replace the mandatory conscription for men, by a voluntary based service. By referendum, the Swiss population refused the project with 73.2% against.

==== Taiwan ====
The Republic of China has had mandatory military service for all males since 1949. Females from the outlying islands of Fuchien were also required to serve in a civil defense role, although this requirement has been dropped since the lifting of martial law. In October 1999, the mandatory service was shortened from twenty-four months to twenty-two months; from January 2004 it was shortened further to eighteen months, and from 1 January 2006 the duration has decreased to sixteen months. The ROC Defense Ministry had announced that should voluntary enlistment reach sufficient numbers, the compulsory service period for draftees will be shortened to fourteen months in 2007, and further to twelve months in 2009.

ROC nationals with Overseas Chinese status are exempt from service. Draftees may also request alternative service, usually in community service areas, although the required service period would be longer than military service. Qualified draftees with graduate degrees in the sciences or engineering who pass officer candidate exams may also apply to fulfil their obligations in a national defense service option which involves three months of military training, followed by an officer commission in the reserves and four years working in technical jobs in the defense industry or government research institutions.

The Ministry of Interior is responsible for administering the National Conscription Agency.

On 1 August 2008, the Defence Minister announced that from 2014 on, Taiwan would have a purely volunteer professional force. However, males who opt not to volunteer will be subjected to three to four-month military training. Those who do not have a tertiary education will have a three-month training when reaching military age, whereas those who are receiving tertiary education will have to complete the training in summer vacations.

Should this policy remain unchanged, although Taiwan will have a purely volunteer professional force, every male will still be conscripted to receive a three- to four-month military training. Thus, after 2014, compulsory military service will still remain in practice in Taiwan.

However, since 2017, the rapid deterioration of People's Republic of China–United States relations has made a concern that the PRC may seek to finalize the current ambiguous status quo of Taiwan Strait dating back to the 1940s with its People's Liberation Army (PLA). In December 2022, the government of the Republic of China announced an reinstatement of the mandatory 1 year long active duty military service from January 2024.

==== Thailand ====
The Military Service Act B.E. 2497 (1954) states that all male citizens of Thailand are obliged to serve in the military upon reaching 21 years of age. High school students have the option of enrolling in the three-year Reserve Officers Training Corps (ROTC) during Matthayom 4–6 (i.e., Grade 10–12). ROTC students drill at a local military installation once per week during the school year for a total of 80 hours, with field training exercise at the end of the second year (over the duration 3 days) and third year (over the duration of 5 days). The ROTC program is operated nearly exclusively by the Royal Thai Army, with recent introductions by the Royal Thai Navy and Royal Thai Air Force, but both with more restrictions on entry (e.g. students of schools near a naval or air force base used for training only). Those who complete the three-year program are exempted from conscription and receive the rank of acting sergeant (E-6) upon graduation from high school. Students who do not complete the program or wish to enroll in the commissioned officer phase of the program can do so at their post-secondary institution. Those who do not complete the ROTC program will be required to report for conscription in early-April of the year in which they reach 21 years of age.

Military service selection is done at a designated date and time at a local school or assembly hall. Each selection station has a quota for recruitment. The process begins with a call for volunteers. Those who volunteer will have the option to choose the branch of service and their date of induction. If the number of volunteers is fewer than the quota for the selection station, the remaining men will be asked to draw a card from an opaque box. The box contains red cards and black cards. Drawing a black card results in exemption from military service. Drawing a red card results in conscription in the branch of service and induction date on the card.

Those who volunteer for military service are free to choose from the three branches of the armed forces (Royal Thai Army, Royal Thai Navy, Royal Thai Air Force). Service obligation varies by educational qualification. Those with a high school diploma or the equivalent and those who have one year of military service education are required to serve for two years if they draw the red card, but if these same individuals volunteer, the service obligation is reduced by half, i.e., reduced to only one year. Those with an associate degree (or equivalent) or higher are required to serve for one year if drafted, but the requirement is reduced to only six months if they volunteered. University students can defer their service as long as they maintain the student status until reaching the age of 27 or obtaining a master's degree or the equivalent, whichever comes first. Undergraduate and graduate students who decide to volunteer are allowed by their institution to put their studies on suspension until the end of term of service. All conscripts, regardless of educational qualification, undergo the same training and receive the same grade and rank upon completion of basic training: private, seaman, or airman (E-1).

In recent years the government has issued new guidelines for better treatment of transgender recruits.

==== Tunisia ====
In Tunisia, compulsory military service applies to citizens once they reach 20 and ends when they reach 35. Those who are engaged in higher education or vocational training programs prior to their military drafting are allowed to delay service until they have completed the programs. The duration of the military service is 1 year. And Conscripts Benefit a monthly allowance of 200 dinars for holders of a higher school diploma or have completed at least two years of graduate successfully and holders of a higher technician certificate of vocational training and 100 dinars for other recruits.

==== Turkey ====
In Turkey, compulsory military service applies to all male citizens from twenty to forty-one years of age (with some exceptions). Those who are engaged in higher education or vocational training programs prior to their military drafting are allowed to delay service until they have completed the programs, or reach a certain age, depending on the program (e.g. 29 years of age for undergraduate degrees). The duration of the basic military service varies. As of July 2013, the reduced durations are as follows: twelve months for privates (previously fifteen months), twelve months for reserve officers (previously sixteen months) and six months for short-term privates, which denotes those who have earned a university degree and have not been enlisted as reserve officers (previously eight months).

Turkish citizens who have lived or worked abroad for at least three years can be exempt from military service in exchange for a certain fee in foreign currencies. In the past, when the General Staff assessed that the military reserve exceeded the required amount, paid military service of one-month's basic training was established by law as a stopgap measure, but had only been practiced ten times during the Republican era before being made permanent, the last one being in 1999. This was done in order to generate funds to recover from the aftermath of the 1999 İzmit earthquake, which took place in the highly industrialized Marmara Region of the country, and had a considerable negative impact on the Turkish economy due to the severe damage it caused to a significant number of residential and industrial structures. Additionally, there were paid military service without requiring any training in 2011 and 2014. The measure has been made permanent with a law issued in 2019.

Although women in principle are not obliged to serve in the military, they are allowed to become military officers.

Conscientious objection of military service is illegal in Turkey and punishable with imprisonment by law. Many conscientious objectors flee abroad mainly to neighbouring countries or the European Union (as asylum seekers or guest workers).

==== Ukraine ====
The options are either reserve officer training for two years (offered in universities as a part of a program which means not having to join the army), or one-year regular service. In Ukraine, a person could not be conscripted after he turned 25 years of age. The Ukrainian army had similar problems with dedovshchina as the Russian army did until very recently, but in Ukraine the problem is getting less severe compared to Russia, due to cuts in the conscript terms (from 24 to 18 months in the early 2000s and then to 12 months in 2004) and cuts in total conscription numbers (due to the switching of the army into a full-time professional army) since the last conscripts are being drafted at the end of 2013. However, due to the war with Russia, conscription was reinstated and remains in power to this day. In 2024, military conscription was replaced by “basic military training”

==== United Arab Emirates ====
The United Arab Emirates started its national service requirement in September 2014. This is the first time the UAE has required mandatory national service. It is compulsory for all male citizens over 18 and under 30 years of age to report for military service. Foreign male residents are not required to serve in the military service. It is optional for females to register for military service, and which they serve for 9 months. Males who hold a high school diploma must complete 11-months of military service, whilst males who have not completed high school must complete three years. All males must register for compulsory military service after graduating high school.

==== Vietnam ====
Vietnam's military service policy change from year to year, but in general there is the commonality that every male citizen aged 17 years or older who meets the health criteria must serve two years for regular military or four years for militia of self-defense. Female citizens are not required to participate in military service, but if volunteered and fully qualified they can still participate. There are special exceptions: such as the citizen brother or brother of fallen heroes, a child of second class war invalids; a sick child of 81% or more; a child of Agent Orange who has a working capacity decrease of 81% or more, a non-military employee, a people's policeman and cadres, civil servants, and youth volunteers to be sent to work and work in areas with particularly difficult socio-economic conditions as prescribed by law for 24 months or more.

== See also ==
- List of enlistment age by country
- Military recruit training
