= Veronika Marchenko =

Veronika Marchenko may refer to:

- Veronika Marchenko (activist), Russian activist
- Veronika Marchenko (archer), Ukrainian archer
