= Do It – One! =

1990 Soviet military drama film by Andrei Malyukov

- A Russian-language DVD cover of Do It – One!
- Directed by: Andrei Malyukov
- Written by: Yevgeny Mesyatsev
- Starring: Yevgeny Mironov; Vladimir Mashkov; Alexei Burykin; Aleksandr Domogarov
- Cinematography: Alexander Ryabov
- Music by: Mark Minkov
- Production companies: Mosfilm; Genre Studio
- Release date: November 1990 (Soviet Union)
- Running time: 85 minutes
- Country: Soviet Union
- Language: Russian

Do It – One! (Russian: Делай — раз!, romanized: Delai — raz!) is a 1990 Soviet military drama film which was directed by Andrei Malyukov, written by Yevgeny Mesyatsev and produced by Mosfilm and Genre Studio as well as being theatrically released in November 1990. Filming for Do It – One! took place in Bilhorod-Dnistrovskyi, Odesa Oblast, southwestern Ukraine. The Soviet Ministry of Defense attempted to prevent Do It – One! from getting made because of the film's portrayal of dedovshchina. The film was not shown on television and was only screened "underground".

== Plot ==
Alexei Gavrilov is conscripted into the Soviet Armed Forces. At the recruiting station he is shoved by Sergeant Shipov. Alexei stops him and demands an apology. A conflict arises between them and Shipov begins harboring resentment towards Gavrilov.

Shipov learns that Gavrilov will go to serve in the Soviet Naval Infantry. Shipov begs the Marines officer, who came to the recruiting station to get new recruits, to transfer the personal file of conscript Gavrilov to his officer, inventing the reason that Gavrilov is his countryman. As a result, instead of serving in the Naval Infantry, Gavrilov falls into the service of a motorized infantry regiment where Shipov serves.

Alexei is in the unit where dedovshchina (hazing) runs rampant. The "grandfathers" force the recruits to do their chores for them, mock them and steal money from them at night. Immediately after arriving at the unit, Shipov forces the "young" to do push-ups and explains to them the "main points" of hazing. But Alexei does not want to obey brute force. In the unit he meets Ivan Botsu and they become friends.

During a skirmish in the dining room, Sergeant Stepanov defends Gavrilov and other recruits. During dismissal, five unknown people attack Stepanov and beat him. And later Shipov threatens Stepanov with a disciplinary battalion if he continues to interfere with him.

The "grandfathers" order Private Botsu to count the days before the demobilization. Botsu refuses, and then "grandfathers" carry out a vile provocation in revenge—Yefreytor Kabanov steals money from one of the "skulls" and plants it in the tunic of Botsu. On examination Shipov takes out money from Botsu's tunic in view of everyone thereby setting everyone else against him. At night, several "skulls" grab Ivan and drag him into the boiler room. This is seen by Stepanov, but, remembering the threats of Shipov, he is idle. In the boiler room Ivan is brutally beaten and humiliated. Gavrilov, coming to the barracks, does not find his friend and understands that something is wrong. He tries to find Ivan and gets into the boiler room. There Alexei is also beaten. Suddenly Sergeant Shipov appears and orders everyone to disperse. Botsu attempts to commit suicide, but Alexei stops him. Realizing that he has no other way out, Gavrilov steals a PK machine gun from the weapons cabinet. An alarm is raised. The entire personnel runs to the boiler room. Gavrilov appears with the weapon in his hands and makes the "grandfathers" do push-ups, and orders Shipov to do them faster than others. Alarm is raised. The guard raised due to the alarm, tries to break into the boiler room. Gavrilov, upon hearing this puts the machine gun on the floor and goes towards the exit.

== Cast ==
- Yevgeny Mironov – Private Alexei Gavrilov
- Vladimir Mashkov – Sergeant Anatoly Shipov
- Alexei Burykin – Private Ivan Botsu
- Aleksandr Domogarov – Junior Sergeant Gosh
- Sergey Shentalinsky – Sergeant Stepanov
- Alexander Mironov – Yefreytor Kabanov
- Alexander Polkov – Artemyev
- Vladimir Smirnov – Private
- Oleg Alexandrov – Private, senior officer
- Andrei Fomin – Private Yeryomenko
- Igor Marchenko – Private, senior officer
- Fyodor Smirnov – Captain Filipenko
- Valeriy Troshin – Private, one of the "skulls"
- Dmitry Orlov – Private Siyazov
- Alexander Inshakov – ringleader of hooligans (also a stunt performer for the film)
- Igor Artashonov – Platoon Commander
- Yevgeny Mundum – Senior Sergeant
