= Dedovshchina =

Hazing and abuse in the Russian army

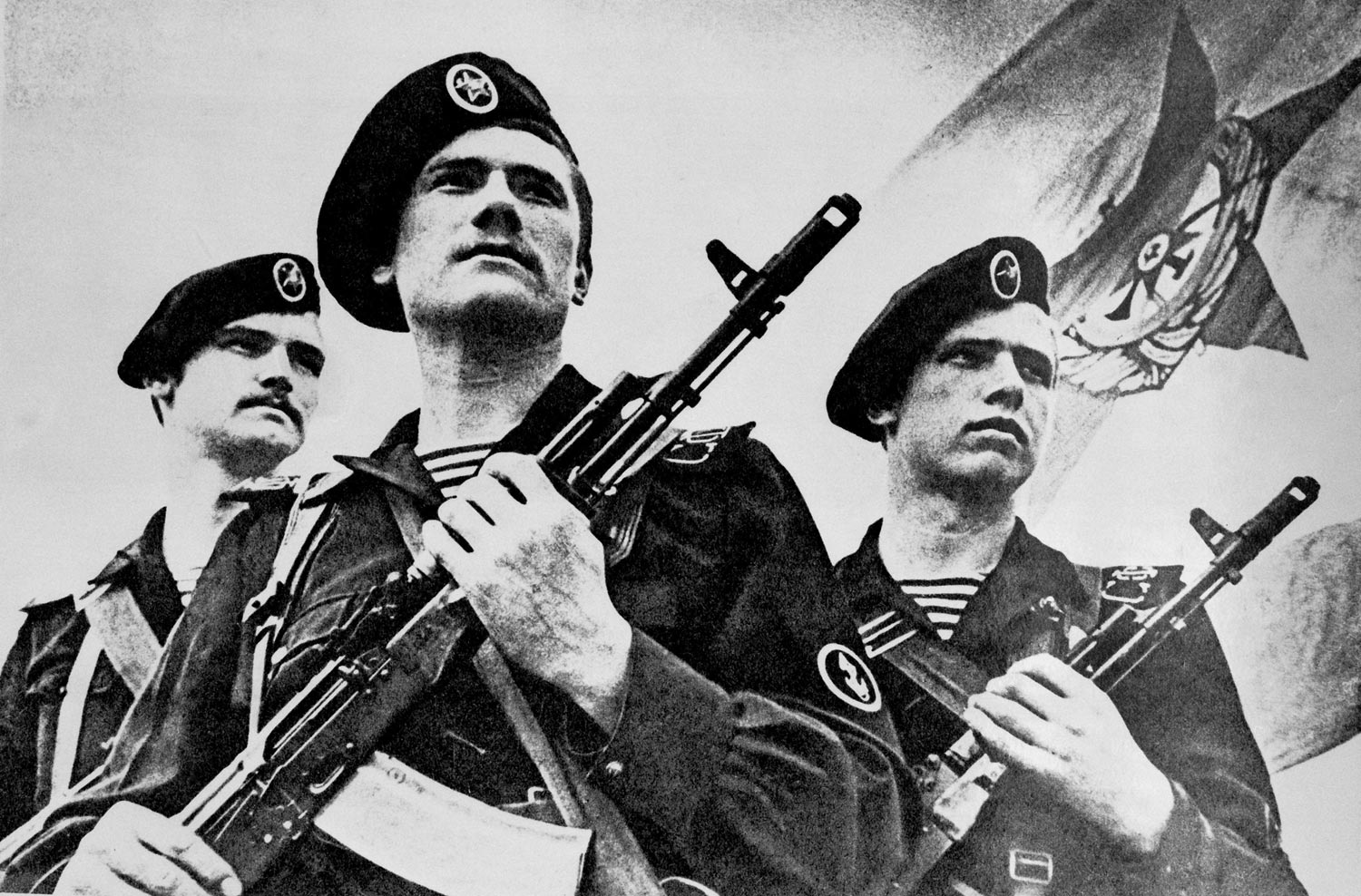
Three Soviet naval infantrymen carrying AK-74 assault rifles in 1985

Dedovshchina (Russian: дедовщина, lit. 'reign of old-timers', Russian pronunciation: [dʲɪdɐˈfɕːinə]) is the informal practice of hazing and abuse of junior conscripts historically in the Soviet Armed Forces and today in the Russian Armed Forces, internal troops, and to a lesser extent FSB, Border Guards, as well as in other armed forces and special services of former Soviet Republics. It consists of brutalization by more senior conscripts, NCOs, and officers. It is a form of non-statutory dominant-status relations between military personnel; the most common form of non-statutory relations, which is a violation of the statutory rules of relations between conscripts, based on the informal hierarchical division of soldiers and sergeants by enlistment and length of service.

The cultural basis of dedovshchina is made up of traditions, customs and rituals that are passed down from conscript to conscript. Often (but not always), these traditions and rituals are associated with the humiliation of the honor and dignity of servicemen of the later conscription by servicemen of the earlier conscription. Dedovshchina encompasses a variety of subordinating and humiliating activities undertaken by the junior ranks, from doing the chores of the senior ranks, to violent and sometimes deadly physical and psychological abuse, such as bullying, torture, sexual torture, and anal rape. There have been occasions where soldiers have been seriously injured or killed.

== Etymology ==
The term is derived from "ded" (Russian: дед, lit. 'grandfather'), which is the Russian Army slang equivalent of gramps, meaning soldiers after their third (or fourth, which is also known as dembel (Russian: дембель or "DMB" Russian: ДМБ)) half-year of compulsory service, stemming from a vulgarization of the word "demobilization" (Russian: демобилизация, romanized: demobilizatsiya – this word is erroneously used by soldiers to describe the act of resigning from the army); soldiers also refer to dembel half-year of conscription, with the suffix -shchina which denotes a type of order, rule, or regime (compare Yezhovshchina, Zhdanovshchina). Thus, it can literally be translated as "rule of the grandfathers". This is essentially a folk system of seniority based on stage of service, mostly not backed by code or law, which only grants seniority to conscripts promoted to various sergeant and yefreitor ranks.

== Torturing techniques ==
Here's some techniques as documented by Vice after the Sychyov's torture case:

The Elephant: Soldiers had to wear a mask that blocked out oxygen and had to recite army regulations, sing patriotic Soviet war songs, or run laps until passing out. If the soldiers try to take off the mask to gasp for air, the torturers would hit them in the solar plexus.

The Television: This was the method that led to Andrey Sychyov's amputations of legs and genitalia. Soldiers sit on a stool and are handed another stool with a cup of water balanced on it. Then, the stools the soldiers are sitting on get yanked underneath and if the cup of water spills, the soldiers will be beaten. The name comes from the act of soldiers staring intensely at the stool and anticipating the stool being yanked.

The Birdie: Using field telephones that are charged by cranking, the torturers would wrap the telephone wires around soldiers' big toes and send electric shocks. The faster the torturers crank the telephones, the stronger the electricity.

Billiards: Torturers put a pool ball in the soldiers' mouth and then start whacking it with a cue. At best, the soldiers get chipped teeth. At worst, the game progresses to the anal torture.

== Features as an offense ==
Non-statutory relations are a broader concept than dedovshchina. Non-statutory relations include the entire range of relationships between servicemen that are not described in the general military regulations (including the relationship between a superior and a subordinate, a subordinate and a superior). Dedovshchina in its narrowest sense covers only those violations of regulations that are related to the relationship between senior and junior enlisted personnel.

In addition, the modern science of criminal and administrative law distinguishes between crimes committed within the framework of the so-called dedovshchina and "barracks hooliganism". The distinguishing feature here is the subjective side of the offense. In the first case, the intention of the offender is aimed at asserting his status as an old soldier, forcing a young soldier to perform household chores, performing certain rituals related to the "dedovshchina traditions", etc. In the second case, the offender's unlawful actions are motivated by personal hostile relations, national, ethnic, religious hostility, property relations, unexpectedly arising hostile relations, etc.

Thus, violations of the statutory rules of relations between servicemen that do not involve relations of subordination within the framework of dedovshchina can be qualified as an encroachment by senior servicemen on the rights, honor, dignity, and personal integrity of junior servicemen.

Often, the phenomenon of dedovshchina is directly related to the ratio of physical and moral strength of the "grandfathers, granpas, veterans, old men, dembels" (slang for "masters") and "devils, spirits, dushar, chekists, cheka, salabons, thingmen, young, elephants" (slang for "slaves").

One of the major negative effects of dedovshchina as a phenomenon is that this army subculture seriously undermines the authority of the army among young people of conscription age and is one of the main reasons for evading military service.

A similar phenomenon, however, not as pronounced as in the army, is also observed in some Russian schools, boarding schools, and other educational and social institutions. Victims are usually physically weaker, insecure, or simply younger. Dedovshchina is not typical for the higher education system, and there are no recorded cases of phenomena resembling dedovshchina in civilian higher education institutions. This is due to the lack of an economic basis for dedovshchina in universities and other civilian higher education institutions.

== Responsibility ==
Violations of statutory relationships are categorized by degree of public danger into:

- disciplinary offenses
- criminal offenses

The latter category includes violations that objectively fall under the disposition of the current articles of the Criminal Code (battery, torture, actions that grossly offend human dignity, robbery, etc.). Responsibility is incurred under the general criminal procedure. Actions of a serviceman who allowed non-regular relations, which do not fall under the definition of a crime, should be regarded as a disciplinary offense (violation of the order of coming on duty for a shift, coercion to perform household chores (if it is not associated with physical violence), coercion to perform non-regular rituals (also without physical violence), etc.). In this case, the responsibility comes in accordance with the requirements of the Disciplinary Regulations of the Russian Armed Forces.

== Dedovshchina as a phenomenon ==
Dedovshchina involves the existence of unofficial hierarchical relationships that parallel the main formal ones, not excluding cases where officers are not only aware of dedovshchina but also use it to maintain "order."

In official statements, some high-ranking military officials speak about the ills of society that have been transferred to the army. For example, such a statement was made in a TV interview by Admiral Vyacheslav Popov, former commander of the Northern Fleet, now a member of the Federation Council and member of the Defense and Security Committee.

Objective studies show that dedovshchina is a product of non-statutory economic activity in the armed forces. At the same time, dedovshchina is an auxiliary tool in the hands of the leadership, which can shift most of its responsibilities for maintaining order to the leaders of the informal hierarchy, offering them some benefits in return (early dismissals, lenient attitude to guilt, reduced physical activity, etc.)

Often, informal relationships are accompanied by humiliation and physical violence (assault). The direct victims of the phenomenon are team members who, for one reason or another, have a low status in the informal hierarchy (status can be determined by seniority, physical, psychophysiological characteristics, nationality, etc.). The basis of the status is physical strength and the ability to insist on one's own way, as well as conflict resistance.

According to Amangeldy Kurmetuly, dedovshchina happens because the modern Russian military is primarily composed of men who did poorly in school and could not enter a university, and they repay the "pressure and harassment" they often received from authority figures onto those weaker than them.

Manifestations of dedovshchina can be very different. In its milder forms, it does not involve threats to life and health or serious humiliation: recruits perform household chores for old men and, from time to time, their household tasks. In its extreme manifestation, dedovshchina reaches the point of group sadism. Manifestations of dedovshchina in the Russian army include forcing recruits to fully serve their "grandfathers" (for example, to wash their laundry), taking away money, clothes and food, subjecting them to systematic abuse and even torture, beating them severely, often causing serious bodily harm. Recently, extortion of money to credit a cell phone account has become very common. Recruits are forced to call home and ask their parents to top up their "grandfather's" account or buy a recharge card, which will then go to the same account. Conscript service in the Russian Armed Forces is often not very different from the procedures and relations between prisoners in penitentiaries ("zones"). "Grandfathers" will often initially extort money from recruits by threatening to kill them. This is to test if the recruit has money, and the "grandfathers" will extort more money from the recruit if he obeys their initial demand.

Dedovshchina is the main reason for regular desertions of conscripts from units and suicides among them. A significant part of violent crimes in the army is associated with dedovshchina: in some cases, these are crimes of "grandfathers" that have been brought to court. In others, the actions of recruits in retaliation, such as the "Artūras Sakalauskas case", when a Lithuanian private, after being nearly raped, murdered five fellow military servicemen, as well as the head of the guard, his assistant and the train conductor on 23 February 1987.

There have been cases where recruits who went on guard duty with military weapons shot their fellow soldiers who had humiliated them beforehand, including the case that formed the basis of the 1990 film The Guard.

== History ==
The phenomenon of hazing has been described as far back as Eton College in the 16th through 18th centuries, where the authority of fellow students was even more cruel and capricious than that of teachers. The school community was of all ages. The age at which boys were sent to school ranged from 8–9 to 16–17 years old. The inequality in strength, age, and length of schooling created a rigid "vertical of power".

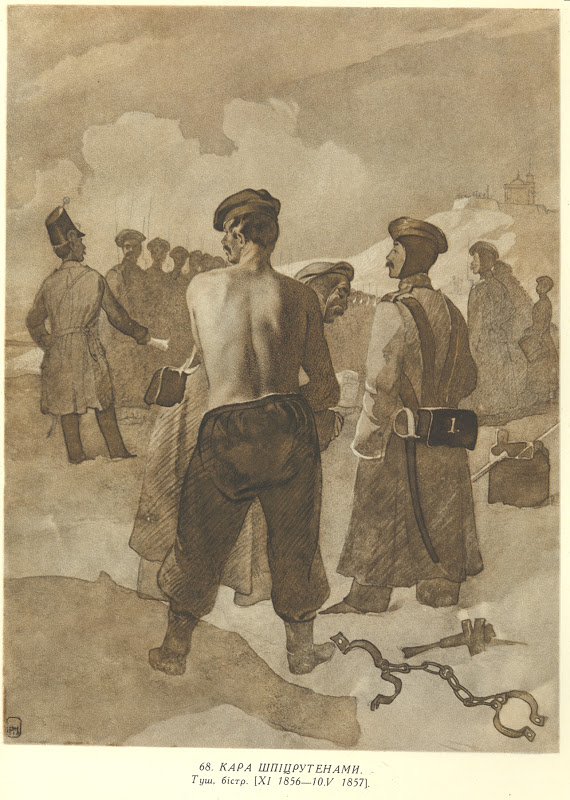
Running the gauntlet (1856/57)

Peter Alekseevich Kropotkin described the traditions that prevailed in the mid 19th century in the most privileged military educational institution of the Russian Empire, the Page Corps. The older students, the chamberlains, "gathered the newcomers in one room at night and drove them around in their nightgowns like horses in a circus. Some cellmates stood in the circle, others outside it, and mercilessly whipped the boys with leather whips."

In the early 20th century, at the Mykolaiv Cavalry School, juniors were called "beasts", seniors were called "cornets", and second-year students were called "majors".

I had to listen to a long narrative about the bitter fate and misfortunes of the poor first-graders, who were "traditionally" cruelly insulted by the "majors" – second-year students, not to mention the upper grades. The techniques of this infantile "tsuka" were striking in their variety and originality and were obviously developed by generations of predecessors. The harsh "majors" of the first class forced the newcomers to "eat flies" as a punishment and just for fun, made "virgula" and "grease" on their short-cropped heads, and simply hit them in the ears on every occasion and even without it.

— A. L. Markov, Cadets and Junkers

"Tsuk" was an outright mockery of the elders over the younger ones: the younger ones were required to do things that were not supposed to be done by senior cadets: salute, make them do squats, howl at the Moon, give them offensive nicknames, wake them up repeatedly at night, and so on. Not only were the officers-educators of military educational institutions aware of the abuse, many of them were convinced that "pull-ups give the junior class discipline and training, and the senior class practice in the use of power".

Participation in such customs was relatively voluntary: when a yesterday's cadet, gymnasium student or student entered the school, the elders first asked him how he wished to live – "according to the glorious tradition of the school or according to the legal statute?" Those who expressed a desire to live "according to the statute" were relieved of the "tsuk", but they were not considered "theirs", called "red" and treated with disdain. Lower-level commanders, such as platoon commanders and watchmasters, were particularly picky about the "reds", and most importantly, after graduation, no Guards regiment accepted them into its officer circle. Therefore, the vast majority of cadets preferred to live "according to tradition", the shortcomings of which were attributed to camaraderie.

== In the Soviet Army ==
The first case of non-statutory relations in the Red Army was recorded in 1919. Three old soldiers of the 1st Regiment of the 30th Division beat to death their fellow Red Army soldier Kupriyanov, a native of the Balakovo district of the Saratov region born in 1901, because the young soldier refused to do their work for the "grandfathers". According to the laws of wartime, those responsible for the soldier's death were shot.

According to one version, the origin of dedovshchina was the change in conscription terms brought about by the law of 12 October 1967, causing two different groups of conscripts to be simultaneously present in the army: Those who were drafted for three-year service, and those only for two-year service. However, A.D. Glotochkin researched psychological problems of young soldiers before 1967. The timing of this coincided with the first wave of conscript shortages. It was found that the five-million-strong Soviet army could be as much as a third short of its strength, due to the demographic consequences of World War II.

During the same year, a decision was reached to draft conscripts with a criminal history into the ranks, due to a demographic crisis following World War II. While oppression by older conscripts has probably always taken place in the army, after that date, with the introduction of the four-class system (created by the bi-annual call-ups) it became systematic and developed its own rules and ranks.

The issue was discussed at a meeting of the Politburo, and a solution was found. People with a criminal record began to be drafted into the army, which had previously been completely excluded. Ideologically, this looked like a correction of fellow citizens who had strayed. However, in reality, things were different: the internal life of the army had changed for the worse. Along with the criminal element, the barracks were infiltrated by criminal networks, and thieves' jargon penetrated the soldiers' language. Copying prison customs, former criminals introduced ritual humiliation and abuse.

In addition, according to other reports, when the time of service was reduced from three to two years, for some time in the same military unit there were both those who were completing their third year and newly enrolled soldiers who were supposed to serve one year less. The latter circumstance angered those who had already served for two years but still had time to serve. Servicemen in their third year of service took out their anger on the new recruits.

However, there are reasons to doubt this version. According to the candidate of sociological sciences A. Solnyshkov, the first and most productive works of Soviet scientists dealing with the issues of dedovshchina appeared in 1964. In addition, according to him, over forty years of studying the phenomenon of dedovshchina, domestic scientists have not managed to make significant progress compared to the productive work of A. D. Glotchokin and his students in the early 1960s.

According to another version, in the late 1960s, some unit commanders began to widely use soldiers' labor for personal material gain. The non-statutory economic activities of military units led to the emergence of a system of non-statutory relations in which old soldiers acted as supervisors over first-year soldiers who performed work. Such relations required the young soldiers to obey any instructions of the old soldiers without question, and to break and turn the recruits into slaves, they were subjected to pressure and violence. Thus, according to this version, dedovshchina originated as a method of managing the non-statutory economic activities of military units. Over time, in a number of military units, officers began to use dedovshchina as a method of management, as they did not want to engage in training young people themselves, as well as educational work.

Also, by the end of the 1960s, the Soviet Armed Forces no longer had the number of veteran commanders who had been the majority in the Soviet Armed Forces after the end of the Second World War and who knew from personal experience that a healthy moral situation in the unit they were entrusted with was the key to their own lives.

In the summer of 1982, the Soviet Army received a secret order No. 0100 on combating non-statutory relationships.

== In the Russian Army ==
Alexander Goltz, a military observer for the Yezhednevniy Zhurnal, states: "The country's top military leadership has managed to defend the idea of preserving the Soviet-style mass mobilization army. This model, in principle, excludes any serious responsibility of commanders for the life and health of their subordinates, reduces conscripts to the position of slaves."

The bulk of the publicized cases of dedovshchina in the Russian Army are related to the use of young soldiers' labor for personal gain by the command staff of military units. Dedovshchina originated in the 1960s in the Soviet army as a method of managing the non-statutory economic activities of military units and continues to develop today.

In 1993, 169 Russian conscripts died as a result of dedovshchina. In a 1995 article, Benjamin S. Lambeth attributed the deaths to extreme incompetence and corruption within the Russian armed forces.

In August 2002, Senior Lieutenant R. Komarnitsky demanded that Privates Tsvetkov and Legonkov leave the unit's location and go home to Samara and earn money through activities unrelated to army service. They were supposed to pay the officer four thousand rubles a month. The soldiers refused, but the demands were repeated and accompanied by pressure and beatings from the old officers.

In October 2003, Samara, Guards motorized rifle regiment of constant readiness. Soldiers who worked at Carton-Pack LLC explained that they did not receive combat training during their "extra work". As a result, they never acquired the necessary combat skills during their entire service. Private E. Holtsiv said that he had fired his personal weapon only once.

On 10 October 2003, human rights activists from the organization "Mother's Right" made a video recording near the military unit No. 12670 of the Volgograd Railway. They filmed dozens of soldiers being transported to work: 32 people to weeding, 10 people to "Rotor" (Volgograd football club). There were 3 or 4 foreign cars with entrepreneurs, minibuses that took the soldiers. There is information that about 200 soldiers were taken out of the unit on one day. Inspections began. The first deputy commander of the Federal Railway Service, General Gurov, came from Moscow. There was a prosecutor's inspection. The commander and his deputy were brought to disciplinary responsibility. However, the illegal work continued until October 2004. The offenders became somewhat more cautious, and organized "fake" work – knocking down container boxes – on the territory of the unit.

Since February 2004, three soldiers have been working at a furniture company in the village of Nadiya (a suburb of Stavropol). None of them received any money or other support, which went into someone's pocket. According to the investigation, the damage to the state from such "write-offs" alone amounted to 120,000 rubles.

The case that occurred on New Year's Eve 2006 in the supply battalion of the Chelyabinsk Tank School, where private Andrey Sychyov and seven other soldiers were beaten for about three hours by their fellow soldiers who were "celebrating" the holidays in this way, received a huge response. Sychyov, who went to military doctors, did not receive the necessary medical care in time. Only by the end of the holidays, due to a sharp deterioration in his health, the young man was transferred to a city hospital, where doctors diagnosed him with numerous fractures and gangrene of the lower limbs (which led to their subsequent amputation), bruises to his genitals (they were amputated too).

=== Impact of service conditions ===
It is generally believed that the most vicious forms of dedovshchina are characteristic of "second-rate" units and branches of the military, especially the construction battalion (Стройбат), but dedovshchina is often revealed in units and formations that are considered "elite". Dedovshchina is much less widespread in troops or units whose soldiers have constant access to personal combat weapons (e.g., the Internal Troops)." In addition, dedovshchina is not widespread in aviation units. Dedovshchina is not widespread in small, remote units (for example, air defense radar reconnaissance units). The least manifestations of dedovshchina are observed in units where unit commanders do not use the work of soldiers for personal gain.

=== Official response ===
Overall, the Russian state has tried and has had mixed results in curtailing dedovshchina. In 2003, on the specific issues of denial of food and poor nutrition, Deputy Minister of Defence V. Isakov denied the existence of such problems.

Vladimir Putin said that dedovshchina was a "great problem", and proposed using the military police to prevent it.

Since 2005, the Russian Ministry of Defence has published monthly statistics of incidents and crimes including cases of death.

In 2005, human rights ombudsman Vladimir Lukin wrote a special report about abuse in the armed forces and proposed measures including the creation of military police.

Russia has changed some of the rules made in 1967. Most notably, criminals are no longer accepted into the army.

Beginning in 2007/08, the conscript service time was reduced from two years to one; dedovshchina primarily occurs when second year conscripts abuse first year conscripts, so this measure is partially intended to curtail the practice.

On 21 April 2010, when Minister of Defence Anatoly Serdyukov announced further steps to establish military police, pursuant to the President's directive. Russian President Medvedev was a strong proponent of the creation of Russian Military Police; one of its main objectives would be to combat dedovshchina. In April 2012, Chief Military Prosecutor Sergei Fridinsky said Russia's military police will be instituted in two stages: first, the integration of the relevant Defence Ministry services (the Commandant's Service and the Military Automobile Inspection) and second, granting the new agency investigative functions. According to Russian media reports, up to 20,000 service members may be assigned to serve as military police.

== In post-Soviet states ==
While most clearly prevalent in Russia, dedovschina has been continued in the armed forces of some other post-Soviet countries.

=== Belarus ===
Hazing and beatings are problems in the Belarusian military, and government investigations have been criticized for characterizing deaths due to hazing as suicides without further investigation or punishment. The 2017 death of recruit Alexander Korzhych was particularly notorious for the brutal circumstances of his death (he was found hanging, with a T-shirt on his head and his legs tied with a shoestring), which caused President Alexander Lukashenko to publicly order a full investigation. While his death was still classified as a suicide, three soldiers were eventually found guilty of abuse of authority.

=== Ukraine ===
A 2000 report by the Immigration and Refugee Board of Canada concerning hazing in Ukraine's army cited a 1998 statement from a Ukrainian officer that in 1997, 107 Ukrainian soldiers committed suicide as a result of hazing, and five more died directly due to hazing.

=== Azerbaijan ===
Hazing has continued to be an issue for the Azerbaijani military, becoming highly visible in 2008 when cell phone footage of recruits being beaten were leaked to YouTube. While official sources had beforehand denied that hazing was occurring in the Azerbaijani military, afterward abusive personnel were arrested and criminal cases were opened by military prosecutors. Independent researchers, including the military think-tank Doktrina Center, stated that hazing was on the rise. The Doktrina Center stated that from 2003 to 2012, 647 Azerbaijani soldiers died, 472 in noncombat situations. Activists contended that the Azerbaijani government concealed the extent of hazing and abuse in the military. In March 2013, large protests to demand greater openness and crackdowns on hazing were organized in Baku and were broken up by riot police; 80 demonstrators were arrested.

=== Armenia ===
Treatment of conscripts has been an issue in Armenia. 2010 saw public outcry due to a number of violent shooting incidents and the posting of a video which showed an officer beating two soldiers. Activists complained that the Ministry of Defense was reluctant to provide any information regarding the vast majority of the deaths caused by hazing. In early 2020, hazing became the subject of public concern in Armenia following a spike in non-combat military deaths. To combat hazing, the National Assembly of Armenia sponsored a law strengthening penalties for inciting soldiers to commit suicide. Naira Zohrabyan, the bill's author, stated "we have an incomprehensible structure, 'dedovschina', that mentality is moving from the street to the army." Prime Minister Nikol Pashinyan issued a statement that decisions would be made to address "problems associated with criminal subculture and discipline in the armed forces", which was generally understood as a reference to 'dedovschina', and fired two senior military officers.

== Current situation ==
Many young men are killed or commit suicide every year because of dedovshchina. The New York Times reported that in 2006 at least 292 Russian soldiers were killed by dedovshchina (although the Russian military only admits that 16 soldiers were directly murdered by acts of dedovshchina and claims that the rest committed suicide). The New York Times stated: "On Aug. 4, it was announced by the chief military prosecutor that there had been 3,500 reports of abuse already this year (2006), compared with 2,798 in 2005". The BBC meanwhile reports that in 2007, 341 soldiers committed suicide, a 15% reduction on the previous year.

Union of the Committees of Soldiers' Mothers of Russia works to protect the rights of young soldiers.

In 2012, a draftee from Chelyabinsk region, Ruslan Aiderkhanov, was tortured to death by his seniors. The one witness who was willing to testify against the alleged perpetrators, Danil Chalkin, was later found shot dead in his military base. A contract soldier, Alikbek Musabekov, was later arrested in this incident.

In 2016, Novaya Gazeta reported that bullying was divided on ethnic lines in a base in Kryazh (near Samara), with ethnic Tuvans and North Caucasians (together making an up about two-thirds of all soldiers at the base) bullying and delegating extra duties to ethnic Russians, who were beaten if they refused. This is exacerbated by the shortage of supplies for the troops, so the Tuvans and North Caucasians stole food from the Russian minority. The North Caucasian soldiers in particular were skilled in mixed martial arts, well-muscled, and attacked in groups, which allowed them to overpower their victims without the use of weapons.

In 2019, according to the Russian military prosecutor office the situation with dedovshchina is getting worse. Incidents of hazing in the army during 2019 have increased. 51,000 human rights violations and 1,521 sexual assault cases. In the same year, Ramil Shamsutdinov shot 10 of his colleagues at a Gorny military base, 8 of them fatally. In court, he alleged that he was subjected to beatings and threats of anal rape. Valentina Melnikova, the head of the Union of the Committees of Soldiers' Mothers of Russia, attributed the resurgence of dedovshchina to the appointment of Sergei Shoigu as the Minister of Defense, since Shoigu did not take action against dedovshchina when he was Minister of Emergency Situations. According to Melnikova, soldiers serving in the Ministry of Emergency Situations under Shoigu were "enslaved by officers" and "beaten", and he did not take any action to stop it. She said that prior Ministers of Defense, starting with Igor Rodionov, but specifically Sergei Ivanov and Anatoly Serdyukov, took measures to reduce the amount of violent instances of dedovshchina happening under their command. Shoigu denied that dedovshchina is currently taking place in the Russian armed forces.

In 2020, the Mother's Right Foundation estimated that 44% of conscript deaths in Russia are caused by suicide, using data from "requests for help it has received".

== Hierarchical stages ==
The meaning of the terms may vary depending on the traditions of the branch of service or military unit, as well as the length of service.

The main definitions in army slang for servicemen according to their length of service are:

- "Smells", "drishchy", "disembodied spirits", "quarantines" – servicemen who are quarantined before being sworn in.
- "Spirits", "elephants" (Navy), "salagi", "beavers", "salabons", "geese" (Airborne Forces), "vasky", "batky", "babies", "hedgehogs", "sparrows" (Air Force), "checks" (Air Force), "chekists" (Air Force), "shchygli", "chyzhi" (a backronym for "man who grants wishes") – servicemen who have served up to six months.
- "Elephants" (Airborne Forces and Airborne Forces), "pomose", "laces", "geese", "crows" (Air Force), "crucian carp" (Navy), "young", "walruses", "goldfinches", "mammoths" – military personnel who served for six months.
- "Skulls", "scoops", "yearlings" (Navy), "bold carp" (Navy), "pheasants", "boilers", "smears" – servicemen who have served for one year.
- "Grandfathers" (dedy) and "dembeli" are servicemen who served for one and a half years. The name of the phenomenon comes from the persistent term "grandfather" (Russian: ded).
- "Dembeli", "citizens" (considered almost civilians): conscripts who have been discharged after receiving an order to be retired.

In the Navy (at least until 1990), there were exactly 7 hierarchical steps:

- up to six months – "spirit" (a disembodied, asexual being, unable to understand anything, unable to do anything, unable to know anything, suitable only for dirty work, often helpless)
- six months – "crucian carp" (a fighter who has been trained in real service, knows the customs, traditions and his duties, but due to the slowness of the "spirits" is often beaten)
- 1 year – "bold carp" (This is a grated bun. He knows the service well. Responsible for the performance of work by "crucians" and "spirits". Subject to physical action in exceptional cases);
- 1 year 6 months – "one-and-a-half" (The first degree of "untouchables". Subject only to moral pressure from senior officers for neglecting their subordinates. A "one-and-a-half" is considered the most evil and merciless creature. At this level, people with low moral standards are very clearly manifested);
- 2 years – "podgodok". The most liberal stage. People who are tired of the moral tension of "one and a half years", not particularly "bothering" with official problems, just rest);
- 2 years 6 months – "godok", or, alternatively, having been used in the TOF: "sarakot" (perhaps that is why the navy calls "dedovshchina" "godkovshchina)". In reality, the ruling upper caste is the old-service men. They resort to physical violence in person in exceptional cases, mainly acting through "half-hearted" people. In turn, informal influence on the staff by officers is carried out exclusively through "godoks");
- 3 years – "profsoyuz" (labor union), "civilian" (This "rank" was granted after the publication of the order of the Russian Minister of Defense on dismissal to the reserve. Immediately after the order of the Minister of Defense, a "godok" was informally recognized as discharged and removed from the reserve, but since he was forced to stay in the unit "by the whims of fate", he allegedly lived on the funds of the navy labor union. Lives in a unit or on a ship as a civilian wearing a military uniform).

== Traditions of promotion to the next level of the hierarchy ==
"The transfer from a lower hierarchical level to a higher one is carried out in the process of the ritual of 'interruption' or 'transfer'. A soldier who did not earn the respect of his fellow soldiers or who violated the principles of dedovshchina, and who refused to live 'according to the dedovshchina' within three 'golden days' after arriving at the military unit (the so-called 'statutory' or 'tightened'), may remain 'unbroken' – in this case, he is not entitled to the privileges of the higher levels of the unofficial hierarchy, but is equated with 'spirits' or 'smells'. This happens infrequently, as an exception."

The transition to the next level is accompanied by physical pain in a special ritualistic way: a soldier who has served a year (previously, when the term of service was 2 years) is struck on the buttocks with a belt (metal buckle part), stool or metal ladle (scoop). The number of strokes is usually equal to the number of months served. The transfer from "grandfathers" to "demobilized" is symbolic, without physical action: the future demobilized man is "beaten" on the backside with a thread through a layer of mattresses and pillows, and a specially selected "spirit" "screams in pain" for him. In some units, additional strokes are given for the merits earned by the time of "transfer" (the rank of corporal or sergeant).

The navy also had a considerable number of customs and traditions, but it is worth highlighting only two main ones, which were often found in different navies.

- When translated from "crucian carp" to "one-and-a-half", the so-called "flushing of scales" takes place. Depending on the weather conditions and the location of the action, the "crucian carp" "wash off the scales" by throwing them overboard, dipping them in an ice hole, pouring them out of a fire hose, etc., trying to perform the rite of passage unexpectedly for the "initiate".
- "tearing of godok" – at the moment of the first printed version of the order of the Russian Minister of Defense "On dismissal to the reserve" (for example, in a newspaper), the entire military uniform, including socks and underwear, is torn into small pieces on the "godok". The ritual is also performed unexpectedly for the "godok". After the "tearing", the "godok" becomes a "profsoyuz", i.e. a civilian. Any serviceman up to the "spirit" has the right to take part in the "tearing".

Usually, the "transfer" takes place on the first night after the Russian Minister of Defense's order "On Discharge to the Reserve" is issued (usually on 27 September and 27 March), but may be postponed for several days, as the command of any unit is well aware of the procedures of "transfer" and often in the first days and nights after the release of the "Order..." particularly strictly monitors compliance with the Military Regulations."

== Dedovshchina in popular culture ==
Several Soviet and Russian films portrayed the dedovshchina despite the military's abstention from helping the production. The following is a selected filmography:

- Do It — One! – Делай – раз! – 1990
- The Guard – Караул – 1990
- Afghan Breakdown – Афганский излом – 1990
- 100 Days Before the Command – Сто дней до приказа – 1990
- Air Hunger – Кислородный голод – 1992
- The Green Elephant – Зеленый слоник – 1999
- Demobbed – ДМБ – 2000
- The 9th Company – 9-я рота – 2005
- The Search – 2014

In the novel The Hunt for Red October, Tom Clancy writes that veteran Soviet naval captain Marko Ramius refused to allow dedovshchina to be practiced anywhere on his boat, dismissing it as "low-level terrorism".

== See also ==
- Andrey Sychyov
- Bullying in the military
- Fagging
- Fragging
- Inside the Soviet Army
- Ragging
- Military sexual trauma
- Military abuse
- Sexual harassment in the military
- Suicide in the military
- Misconduct in the military
- Gulag
- Prison rape
