= Mother's Right Foundation =

- Founded: 1989
- Founder: Veronika Marchenko, Margarita Pashkova, Inna Plavan
- Type: Non-profit
- Purpose: charity, human rights, legal representation
- Location: Moscow, Russia
- Members: The Mother’s Right Foundation is not a membership-based organization The foundation has 750 coordinators in Russia and the CIS states
- Owner: Public Foundation
- Key people: Veronika Marchenko – Board Chair of the Mother’s Right Foundation
- Revenue: The organization takes donations to implement its work as stated in the statute
- Employees: 8
- Volunteers: 345
- Website: http://mright.hro.org/eng

The Mother's Right Foundation (Russian: Право Матери, romanized: Pravo Materi) is a Russian, non-profit, non-government human rights organization which works to protect the rights of families whose sons died in military service as a result of hazing, criminal actions, unsanitary living conditions, unhealthy psychological environment, etc.

According to the information of human rights activists, 3,000 people die annually while performing military service in the Russian army, and in many cases parents of dead soldiers do not receive any support from the government. Per founder of this organization, Annually over 3,000 families of dead soldiers contact their foundation with requests for help, as ‘very often parents are the only people who want to ensure a fair investigation into the deaths of soldiers’.

The organization was established in 1989 under the original name ‘Association of Parents Whose Sons Died in the Army on the USSR Territory during Peacetime’. The foundation was granted an official registration by the Ministry of Justice of the Russian Federation on March 4, 1993, and then was re-registered by the Moscow Justice Department on June 16, 1999. The founder and the current leader of the organization is Veronika Marchenko, the first Russian woman to receive the International Women of Courage Award (2009).

"The story of the establishment and development of the Mother’s Right Foundation is unique …. At the same time this story reflects the evolution of the human rights movement and, moreover, the evolution of the entire ‘third sector’ in Russia during the 1990s."

— Columbia Law School. Pursuing the Public Interest. New York. 2001;
Yurist. Pursuing the Public Interest. Moscow. 2004.

The foundation was established as a professional charitable organization, and the foundation's lawyers work pro bono (lat., free of charge, for public good) providing support to parents of dead soldiers.

In 2007, there were 396 articles published about the foundation by the independent media.

== Objectives and Tasks ==
The mission of the organization is to facilitate the promotion of the following concepts in Russia:

1. The idea of the rule-of-law state, where the needs of citizens have become a real priority of the state;
2. Access to legal aid for those in need;
3. Professionalization of the armed forces.

The objective of the organization's work is:

“to accumulate capital and funds through charitable donations and to utilize them to provide legal, medical and other professional support to families of soldiers who died in military service; to provide social support to families of dead soldiers”.

— Statute of the Mother’s Right Foundation

The foundation's lawyers work to facilitate effective investigation of all cases that involve deaths of conscripts during military service and realization of their parents’ right to fair trial.

"Lawyers of the Mother’s Right Foundation … provide assistance to families of dead soldiers both to ensure effective investigation into soldiers’ deaths and to defend families’ right to social support and protection."

— Novaya Gazeta. February 17, 2010.

== Work Scope ==
“Background information from REGNUM: the Mother’s Right Foundation, a Russian charitable public organization, has been working since 1989 in the following fields: raising public awareness of legal issues and providing legal assistance to families of dead soldiers; lawmaking; sociological surveys; publishing; information dissemination; charity; providing moral and psychological rehabilitation to families of dead soldiers. Parents of dead soldiers consult the foundation’s lawyers on issues related to social security (pensions, welfare allowances and benefits, insurance), housing rights, criminal and procedural law, and moral damage compensation, either personally or by phone.”

— REGNUM Information Agency. August 30, 2005

1. The foundation educates parents and widows of dead soldiers about their legal rights and represents their rights in courts of all instances.

“The Mother’s Right Foundation is a non-profit organization that provides legal assistance to parents of dead soldiers that are neglected by the state. When I say soldiers I mean not only private soldiers but also cadets and officers – all of them. I mean not only those who were killed in combat but also servicemen who were killed in the peacetime army as well. Last year the foundation provided assistance to 5,788 families. In the first half of the current year, 3,115 families received our assistance.”

— Novaya Gazeta. November 9, 2009.

2. The foundation is engaged in lawmaking: it actively promotes and lobbies for amendments to the current legislative framework.

3. The foundation conducts sociological surveys on human rights violations in the army.

“The figures presented by the Mother’s Right Foundation are based on tens of thousands of questionnaires distributed and reviewed by its lawyers. Their data show no discrepancies.... The Public Prosecutors Office collects statistics of their own, while the Mother’s Right Foundation over the years has been steadily accumulating the flow of applications and complaints from families whose members perished or succumbed to illnesses, sometimes even after they were discharged from the army. This is also a separate legal issue.”

— Ekho Moskvy Radio. Where Do Soldiers Run To? February 21, 2005

“Already in October 2009, the Mother’s Right Foundation raised the issue of the poor living conditions in military unit No. 24776 and sent an appeal to the president of the Russian Federation, Dmitry Medvedev. At that time the foundation was considering several appeals from the parents of the soldiers who were serving in Barabash Village,” reports NEWSru.com

— Novy Region–Far East. July 8, 2010

4. The foundation publishes two periodicals:

- Dead Soldiers Memory Book. The periodical is a collection of stories of victims of violence in the army. Each book has short bios and photos of hundreds of young men who died in military service during peacetime. The foundation continues its work to find opportunities to publish new editions of the book, as the organization has accumulated a tremendous amount of this kind of information. So far, seven editions of the book One Hundred out of Fifteen Thousand, in three volumes, have been published (Izvestiya. Moscow. 1992; Izvestiya. Moscow. 1994; Human Rights. Moscow. 2000).

“… On the wall blackened with smoke there are photos of Alyosha. A strong and handsome young man.… He was a great support to his mother. He was fond of sports. Legally he did not have to do military service, since his mother had a disability of 2nd degree. But he made the decision to do his civic duty. He served in Germany, and that is where he died. His is a story of a soldier who died in military service during peacetime. The book’s title is ‘One Hundred out of Fifteen Thousand’, and it was published by the Mother’s Right Foundation.”

— Pozitsiya. Tver. August 14, 2007
- Legal Advice to Parents of Dead Soldiers. The periodical covers a range of important legal issues faced by parents who lost their children during their military service. It includes legal cases of the Mother's Right Foundation which became legal precedents. Four editions of the periodical have been issued so far (Human Rights. Moscow. 1997; 2000; 2005; 2008). The third and the fourth editions were distributed to 2,600 federal courts of the Russian Federation.

“The book has a circulation of ten thousand copies and will be distributed free of charge through the network of the foundation’s regional coordinators and representatives of public organizations. Additionally, a sizable share of the circulation will be mailed to regional and district courts. Everyone who is interested in obtaining the book can do so by contacting a regional office of the foundation or by sending a written request to the Moscow office of the organization.”

— REGNUM IA. Legal Handbook [Reference Book] for Parents of Dead Soldiers was Published. August 29, 2005

5. The foundation works with the media and issues press releases and bulletins;
6. The foundation provides affordable financial support to parents of dead soldiers;
7. The foundation works to provide emotional and psychological support to parents of dead soldiers;
8. The foundation is assisted by volunteers and interns.

“Veronika Marchenko, Board Chair of the Mother’s Right Foundation: ‘We certainly rely on the support of our volunteers – people who devote their spare time to provide free assistance to our organization. Moreover, we believe that if a public organization has its own network of volunteers, it is a positive sign that the organization is efficient and that the organization’s work is needed.’”

— Infoblago.Ru

== Prominent Cases ==
1. The foundation provided legal support to parents and widows of Heroes of the Russian Federation (1999–2010).

“…The Mother’s Right Foundation, an interregional public charitable foundation (http://mright.hro.org), confirmed that this kind of situation is common in many regions of the country. The foundation has been working on the cases of families of Heroes and veterans free of charge since 1999.”

— Rossiyskaya Gazeta. Nedelya. September 24, 2009

2. The Mother's Right Foundation successfully defended one of its applicants in a criminal case in the Constitutional Court of the Russian Federation (Decision of the RF Constitutional Court No. 447-O of 5 December 2003)

“… The above mentioned Decision of the Constitutional Court of the Russian Federation is very important as it allows applicants with low income to engage experienced and highly qualified lawyers, who are not attorneys, to ensure protection of their rights and interests. Such experts can be lawyers from human rights organizations and others. (Quite importantly, this complaint was filed to the Constitutional Court by the Human Rights Commissioner who was initiated by such public organization – the Mother’s Right Foundation that has been representing families of dead soldiers for many years.)”

— O. Y. Krivonosova, D. V. Kulagin, D. B. Shabelnikov, edited by N. M. Kipnis, M. A. Krasnov. Report ‘Provision of Free Legal Aid in the Russian Federation’. 2004.

3. As a result of the work of the Mother's Right Foundation, the families of the submariners who perished in the Kursk submarine disaster were recognized as the wronged party.,.

“…Recognition of the families of the submariners who perished in the Kursk submarine disaster as a wronged party has an important significance. Now they and their representatives have a legal right to participate in the trial and to study all the details uncovered as a result of the ongoing investigation into the causes of the Kursk submarine disaster.”

— Trud. April 11, 2002

4. The Mother's Right Foundation helped to ensure compensation for moral damage in the case of the loss of the Armavir Special Forces Detachment in Chechnya caused by a friendly fire:

“… In the case of Nikolay Vlasov against the Ministry of Internal Affairs, the Treasury Administration of the Ministry of Finance of the Republic of Mari El was sentenced to pay a fine of 500,000 rubles. This is the biggest compensation ever won by the Mother’s Right Foundation in favour of the parents of a dead soldier. It is also the first case when the State acknowledged its own responsibility before its citizens who lost their son in combat. The 19-year-old soldier of the Armavir Special Forces Detachment Stanislav Vlasov was killed on September 10, 1999 as a result of a friendly fire on the part of the federal air force that was caused by the gun layer’s misjudgment.”

— Izvestiya. They Have the Right. December 3, 2002

5. The foundation's case in the Supreme Court of the Russian Federation led to the cancellation of Decree of the Ministry of Defense No. 444 of 02.12.1997 (Decision of the RF Supreme Court No. VKPI-00-27 of 27.04.2000).

== Rating of Military Units in the Russian Federation ==
In the autumn of 2004 the Mother's Right Foundation issued a rating of the most dangerous military units in Russia in the past 10 years (1994–2004). The rating was based on the analysis of 5,433 questionnaires filled out by parents of dead soldiers, who contacted the Foundation during the period of 1994–2004.
The Article ‘Eyes Toward Death’ (Artyom Davydov. Moskovsky Komsomolets) caused a public outcry.

“Today the Moskovsky Komsomolets Newspaper is publishing the rating of the most 'deadly' military units made in cooperation with the Mother’s Right Foundation and based on letters of parents of dead soldiers.”

— Polit.ru. Russian Army’s Most Deadly Units. Rating by the Mother’s Right Foundation. 26 October 2004

“The Mother’s Right Foundation has published a rating of military units that have the highest soldier death rate. It is based on 5,433 questionnaires that were collected over the past 10 years... According to experts, non-combat deaths are primarily caused by hazing, violation of safety regulations, negligence of those in command and unsanitary living conditions.”

— South Region Portal YUGA.RU. A military unit from Kuban tops the rating as it has the highest number of non-combat deaths. October 26, 2004.

“… the rating of military units made by the Moskovsky Komsomolets Newspaper and the Mother’s Right Foundation is based on application letters from parents of dead soldiers.”

— Anna Davydova. A military unit from the Central Urals is rated among the most ‘deadly’ News Service of UralPolit.Ru. October 26, 2004

== Actions ==
In 2010–2011, the Mother's Right Foundation started a project in the social net Odnoklassniki.ru that was dedicated to the memory of servicemen who died in the army during peacetime. The Foundation's activists set up dead servicemen's accounts to present their profiles in the first person - as if written by the victims. They also displayed the dead servicemen's pictures with mourning ribbons. Thus, their abandoned profiles and data revived on the pages of their friends who learnt about their lives and deaths. The project was performed by a group of volunteers. They asked the servicemen's parents’ permission to use their sons’ personal data. “The idea of the Odnoklassniki project is simple: the Ministry of Defense was interested in the boys only when they were called up to military service. And now, after their tragic deaths, they are forgotten, as if they never existed. We consider it unfair. They have been and will always be alive to their parents and close relatives. We would like other people to hear their voices. These boys joined the army and fulfilled their military duty and thus, they deserve to be heard by society,” reported Veronica Marchenko, board chair of the Mother's Right Foundation, to Interfax. “The project is meant to prevent the Ministry of Defense from consigning to oblivion the servicemen’s names and faces, and turn them into indifferent numbers of the official statistics. Many people will now read the soldiers’ stories. It has nothing to do with the spiritualistic séance. As a rule, parents of dead soldiers were grieving the loss of their sons in isolation,” tells the head of the foundation. “Nobody cared about them. Now, they receive comments from hundreds of people. They receive words of encouragement. For the first time, they feel the sympathy of society.” “We really like the foundation’s idea,” says Ivan Sergeyevich Dolin, citizen of Tchaikovsky Town, Perm Region, and the father of Anton Dolin who was bullied to death in the Vityaz Special Forces Detachment, Dzerzhinsky Division, Moscow Region. “Let people remember them.”

== Charity ==
At the end of December 2000, a charitable auction organized by the deputies of the State Duma of the Russian Federation, V. E. Koptev-Dvornikov, V. O. Semyonov and A. Y. Vulf, was held at the Metelitsa Club in Moscow. Altogether, 58 lots belonging to 51 celebrities were sold. The most expensive lot was Alsou's concert dress. Other lots - from most to less expensive - were as follows: Lev Leschenko's hat, Iosif Kobzon's concert costume, Anatoly Karpov's first chess set, Kristina Orbakaite's concert dress, Tatyana Ovsienko's wedding dress, Valery Leontiev's tail-coat, Larisa Dolina's concert dress, and Irina Khakamada's home kimono. The raised funds were transferred into the account of the Mother's Right Foundation (totaling over 500,000 rubles). The funds were evenly distributed among the parents of the soldiers who perished in Chechnya. In 2006, the foundation raised 127,249 rubles in donations to help the mother of Andrey Sychyov who was bullied to death during his military service.,.

== Awards ==
In 2004, Kariera made the first rating of Russian charitable organizations and foundations. The Mother's Right Foundation was awarded the 4th place among 400 nominees.

“While making a rating of Russian charitable organizations and foundations, we were guided by the motto ‘to measure the measurable and to make the immeasurable measurable.’” The rating was based on expert assessments. As the first step, The Kariera Magazine made a list of 400 organizations and foundations involved in charity work….Then the experts evaluated the participating organizations according to the following 4 criteria: publicity, compliance with the claimed status, efficiency and financial transparency. The score ranged from 1 to 10.… The fourth place was awarded to a human right organization - the Mother’s Right Foundation.”

— The Kariera Magazine. No. 5 (58). 2004

In accordance with the results of the contest organized by the SuperJob.Ru Portal in 2008, the foundation was recognized as the Employer of Choice.

== Location ==
The office of the foundation is located in the Central Administrative District of Moscow in Luchnikov Lane. It has been there since August 1992. Like many public organizations, the foundation had to fight to have their office in a convenient and accessible location.

“Last November, the Mother’s Right Foundation, an organization that provides support to parents of dead soldiers, almost got evicted from the occupied office. “I was 42 when my son died. I had no wish to live. It was the Church and Veronika Marchenko (Board Chair of the Mother’s Right Foundation – NI) who saved my life. I beg you, Vladimir Nikolayevich, please do not take our home away. Because the Mother’s Right Foundation is the home that helps me feel connected to my son. Lyudmila Perkova, mother of a dead soldier.” This is the type of letter that Vladimir Silkin, Chief of the Moscow Property Department, was receiving from people all over Russia. “We contacted the Prosecutor General’s Office and the Federal Antimonopoly Service and were told that there were no obstacles for the Moscow Property Department to renew the contract,” Veronika Marchenko told NI”.

— Novye Izvestia. July 7, 2009

== Internet Representation ==
- Foundation blog in LiveJournal
- Foundation's group in Facebook
- Foundation's profile in Facebook
- Foundation's account in Twitter

== Video Materials ==
- We Are Against Deaths in the Army
- Letters of a Dead Man: Evgeny Shirshov, 1998
- Memorial Service for Those Who Died in the Army, February 23, 1999
- Cases Against the Ministry of Defense (the Chechen Lawsuits) 1999-2001
- Day of Commemoration and Mourning for Those who Died in Military Service, February 23, 2001
- The Case Against the Russian Northern Fleet (‘Kursk’ Nuclear Submarine), 2002
- Died in Military Service: Vasily Nikolayev, 2006
