= Beating of Andrey Sychyov =

2005 beating in the Russian Armed Forces

On December 31, 2005, four members of the Russian Armed Forces tortured fellow soldier Andrey Sergeyevich Sychyov (Russian: Андре́й Серге́евич Сычёв, also transliterated Sychev or Sychov) at the Chelyabinsk Tank Academy in Chelyabinsk, Russia.

== Incident and treatment ==
On December 31, 2005, Sychyov and eight other soldiers were beaten for three hours by their seniors, who may have been drunk. Junior Sergeant Alexander Sivyakov, then 19, who felt that the soldiers had not adequately cleaned up after their New Year's Eve party, forced Sychyov to squat with his hands tied behind his back while a sergeant beat him for three and a half hours. The base clinic was closed for New Year's, and Sychyov was unable to receive medical attention until January 4. Two days later he was transferred to the city hospital due to worsening health. Doctors diagnosed him with numerous broken bones, trauma to the genital area and gangrene of the legs.

As a result of gangrene in the legs, doctors had to amputate both of his legs, his genitalia, and a finger. Andrey Sychyov's mother, Galina Sychyov, was not aware of his condition until after his first amputation. Galina claimed that an unknown military official had offered her $100,000 and an apartment if Andrey did not pursue legal action.

== Trial ==
Junior Sergeant Alexander Sivyakov, also a conscript, was tried for the torture of Sychov and five other counts of abuse. Three soldiers who testified claimed that a general had told them not to. Sivyakov was sentenced to four years in prison—less than a six-year term that prosecutors had requested—and was also stripped of his rank and barred from holding command for three years. Two other soldiers, Pavel Kuzmenko and Gennady Bilimovich, were found guilty as well and given suspended sentences of one and a half years and a year of probation.

== Subsequent events ==
In September 2007 it was reported that Andrey Sychyov tried to be included in the party election list of the Union of Rightist Forces (SPS), for the State Duma elections.

== See also ==
- Dedovshchina
- Hazing
- Fagging
- Ragging
