= Bullying in the military =

Acts of abuse in the armed forces

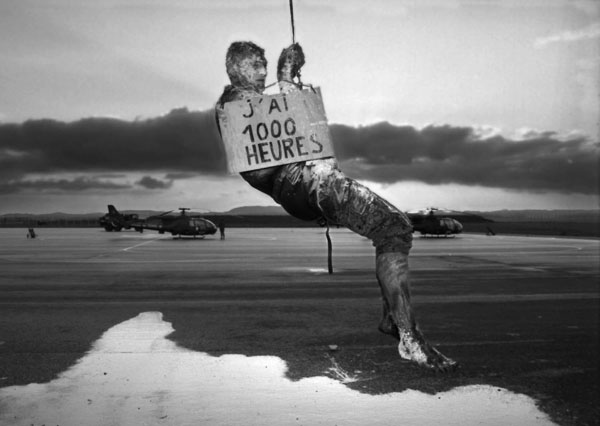
Hazing of a Gazelle helicopter pilot - Light Aviation of the French Army.

In 2000, the UK Ministry of Defence (MOD) defined bullying as: "...the use of physical strength or the abuse of authority to intimidate or victimise others, or to give unlawful punishments." A review of a number of deaths, supposedly by suicide, at Princess Royal Barracks, Deepcut by Nicholas Blake QC indicated that whilst a bullying culture existed during the mid to late 1990s many of the issues were being addressed as a result of the Defence Training Review.

Some argue that this behaviour should be allowed because of a general academic consensus that "soldiering" is different from other occupations. Soldiers expected to risk their lives should, according to them, develop strength of body and spirit to accept bullying.

In some countries, ritual hazing amongst recruits has been tolerated and even lauded as a rite of passage that builds character and toughness; while in others, systematic bullying of lower-ranking, young or physically slight recruits may in fact be encouraged by military policy, either tacitly or overtly (see dedovshchina).

== See also ==
- Military
- Military abuse
- Dedovshchina
