= List of enlistment age by country =

These are the enlistment ages for military service by country, according to the online CIA publication The World Factbook.

== A ==
- Albania – 19 (voluntary; age lowered to 18 during wartime)
- Algeria – 19 (compulsory)
- Angola – 18 (voluntary – men), 20 (voluntary – women), 20 (compulsory – men)
- Antigua and Barbuda – 18 (voluntary)
- Argentina – 18 (voluntary during peacetime; compulsory for men during wartime)
- Armenia – 18 (compulsory)
- Australia – 18 (voluntary; age 17 with parental consent)
- Austria – 17 (voluntary), 18 (compulsory)
- Azerbaijan – 17 (voluntary), 18 (compulsory)
- Afghanistan - 18 (voluntary) 20 (compulsory)

== B ==
- Bahamas – 18 (voluntary)
- Bahrain – 18 (voluntary)
- Bangladesh – 16 (voluntary)
- Barbados – 18 (voluntary)
- Belarus – 18 (compulsory)
- Belgium – 18 (voluntary)
- Belize – 18 (voluntary)
- Benin – 18 (compulsory)
- Bhutan – 18 (voluntary), 20 (compulsory militia training)
- Bolivia – 18 (voluntary)
- Bosnia and Herzegovina – 18 (voluntary)
- Botswana – 18 (voluntary)
- Brazil – 18 (compulsory)
- Brunei – 17 (voluntary)
- Bulgaria – 18 (voluntary)
- Burkina Faso – 18 (voluntary)
- Burundi – 18 (voluntary)

== C ==
- Cape Verde – 17 (voluntary), 18 (compulsory)
- Cambodia – 18 (compulsory)
- Cameroon – 18 (voluntary)
- Canada – 16.5 (voluntary; volunteers can join the Reserves and enter the Military Colleges at age 16.5, or join the regular forces at age 17 with parental consent)
- Central African Republic – 18 (voluntary)
- Chad – 18 (voluntary), 20 (compulsory – men), 21 (compulsory – women)
- Chile – 18 (voluntary)
- People's Republic of China – 18 (compulsory; only registration is compulsory. People do not have to serve in the military) 17 with parental permission.
- Colombia – 18 (compulsory)
- Comoros – 18 (voluntary)
- Democratic Republic of the Congo – 18 (compulsory)
- Republic of the Congo – 18 (voluntary)
- Côte d'Ivoire – 18 (compulsory)
- Croatia – 18 (compulsory)
- Cuba – 17 (compulsory)
- Cyprus – 17 (voluntary), 18 (compulsory for Greek Cypriots only)
- Czech Republic – 18 (voluntary)

== D ==
- Denmark – 18 (compulsory)
- Djibouti – 18 (voluntary)
- Dominican Republic – 18 (voluntary)

== E ==
- Ecuador – 18 (compulsory; conscription is currently suspended until further notice)
- Egypt – 18 (compulsory)
- El Salvador – 18 (compulsory)
- Equatorial Guinea – 18 (compulsory)
- Eritrea – 18 (compulsory)
- Estonia – 18 (compulsory)
- Eswatini (Swaziland) – 18 (voluntary)
- Ethiopia – 18 (voluntary)

== F ==
- Fiji – 18 (voluntary)
- Finland – 18 (compulsory)
- France – 18 (voluntary)

== G ==
- Gabon – 20 (voluntary).
- Gambia – 18 (compulsory).
- Georgia – 18 (compulsory).
- Germany – 18 (compulsory; conscription not enforced(17 with parental consent)
- Ghana – 18 (voluntary).
- Greece – 18 (voluntary), 19 (compulsory; conscription age can be lowered to 17 during wartime).
- Guatemala – 17 (compulsory).
- Guinea – 18 (voluntary).
- Guinea-Bissau – 16 (voluntary, with parental consent), 18 (compulsory).
- Guyana – 18 (voluntary).

== H ==
- Honduras – 18 (voluntary)
- Hungary – 18 (voluntary)

== I ==
- India – 16.5 (voluntary, for National Defense Academy), 17.5 (voluntary, for all others on the Agnipath scheme)
- Indonesia – 18 (voluntary)
- Iran – 18 (compulsory)
- Iraq – 18 (voluntary)
- Ireland – 18 (voluntary)
- Israel – 17 (voluntary), 18 (compulsory for Jews and Druze only)
- Italy – 18 (voluntary)

== J ==
- Jamaica – 17 (voluntary)
- Japan – 18 (voluntary)
- Jordan – 17 (compulsory)

== K ==
- Kazakhstan – 18 (compulsory)
- Kenya – 18 (voluntary)
- North Korea – 17 (compulsory)
- South Korea – 18 (compulsory)
- Kuwait – 17 (voluntary)
- Kyrgyzstan – 18 (compulsory), 19 (voluntary – women)

== L ==
- Laos – 18 (compulsory)
- Latvia – 18 (compulsory)
- Lebanon – 17 (voluntary)
- Lesotho – 18 (voluntary)
- Liberia – 18 (voluntary)
- Libya – 18 (compulsory)
- Lithuania – 18 (compulsory)
- Luxembourg – 18 (voluntary)

== M ==
- Madagascar – 18 (compulsory)
- Malawi – 18 (voluntary)
- Malaysia – 18 (voluntary)
- Maldives – 18 (voluntary)
- Mali – 18 (compulsory)
- Malta – 18 (voluntary)
- Mauritania – 18 (voluntary), 18 (compulsory, conscription not enforced)
- Mexico – 18 (compulsory)
- Moldova – 18 (compulsory)
- Mongolia – 18 (compulsory)
- Montenegro – 18 (voluntary)
- Morocco – 18 (voluntary), 19 (compulsory, reintroduced in 2019); both sexes are obligated to military service; conscript service obligation - 12 months
- Mozambique – 18 (compulsory)
- Myanmar – 18 (voluntary)

== N ==
- Namibia – 18 (voluntary)
- Nepal – 18 (voluntary)
- Netherlands – 17 (voluntary)
- New Zealand – 17 (voluntary; soldiers are not deployed in combat before the age of 18)
- Nicaragua – 18 (voluntary)
- Niger – 18 (compulsory)
- Nigeria – 18 (voluntary)
- North Macedonia – 18 (voluntary)
- Norway – 17 (voluntary – men), 18 (voluntary – women), 19 (compulsory;)

== O ==
- Oman – 18 (voluntary)

== P ==
- Pakistan – 16 (voluntary)
- Papua New Guinea – 18 (voluntary; age 16 with parental consent)
- Paraguay – 18 (compulsory)
- Peru – 18 (voluntary)
- Philippines – 17 (voluntary)
- Poland – 18 (voluntary; enlistment age can be lowered to 17 during wartime)
- Portugal – 18 (voluntary)

== Q ==
- Qatar – 18 (compulsory)

== R ==
- Romania – 18 (voluntary)
- Russia – 18 (compulsory)
- Rwanda – 18 (voluntary)

== S ==
- Saint Kitts and Nevis – 18 (voluntary)
- San Marino – 15 (voluntary)
- São Tomé and Príncipe – 17 (voluntary), 18 (compulsory)
- Saudi Arabia – 17 (voluntary)
- Senegal – 18 (voluntary), 20 (compulsory)
- Serbia – 18 (voluntary)
- Seychelles – 18 (voluntary)
- Sierra Leone – 18 (voluntary)
- Singapore – 16.5 (voluntary), 18 (compulsory)
- Slovakia – 18 (voluntary)
- Slovenia – 18 (voluntary)
- Somalia – 18 (compulsory)
- South Africa – 18 (voluntary)
- South Sudan – 18 (compulsory)
- Spain – 18 (voluntary)
- Sri Lanka – 18 (voluntary)
- Sudan – 18 (compulsory)
- Suriname – 18 (voluntary)
- Sweden – 18 (compulsory)
- Switzerland – 18 (voluntary), 19 (compulsory)
- Syria – 18 (voluntary)

== T ==
- Taiwan – 19 (compulsory)
- Tajikistan – 18 (compulsory)
- Tanzania – 18 (voluntary)
- Thailand – 18 (voluntary), 21 (compulsory)
- Timor-Leste – 18 (voluntary)
- Togo – 18 (voluntary)
- Tonga – 18 (voluntary; age 16 with parental consent)
- Trinidad and Tobago – 18 (voluntary; age 17 with parental consent)
- Tunisia – 18 (voluntary), 20 (compulsory)
- Turkey – 18 (voluntary), 21 (compulsory)
- Turkmenistan – 18 (compulsory)

== U ==
- Uganda – 18 (voluntary)
- Ukraine – 18 (voluntary) 25 (compulsory; was 27 before April 2024)
- United Arab Emirates – 18 (compulsory)
- United Kingdom – 18 (voluntary; age 16 with parental consent; age 17.5 for admission to an officer program; Nepalese citizens can join the Brigade of Gurkhas at age 17)
- United States – 18 (voluntary registration), 18 (voluntary service; age 17 with parental consent), 17 (compulsory militia service under 10 U.S. Code § 246)
- Uruguay – 18 (voluntary)
- Uzbekistan – 18 (compulsory)

== V ==
- Vatican City – 19 years old. The Holy See maintains a small volunteer force of Swiss nationals who make up the Pontifical Swiss Guard.
- Venezuela – 18 (compulsory)
- Vietnam – 18 (compulsory)
- Vanuatu - 18 (voluntary)

== Y ==
- Yemen – 18 (voluntary)

== Z ==
- Zambia – 18 (voluntary; age 16 with parental consent)
- Zimbabwe – 18 (voluntary)
