= Veronika Marchenko (activist) =

Russian activist

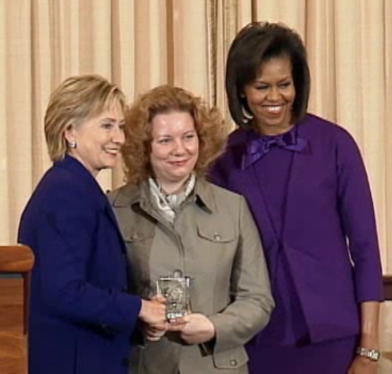
Veronika Marchenko with Secretary of State Hillary Clinton and First Lady Michelle Obama in 2009.

Veronika Aleksandrovna Marchenko (Russian: Вероника Александровна Марченко) is a Russian activist. In 2008 she was the head of the NGO Mother's Right Foundation, which she founded as a student in 1988.

== Life ==
The Mother's Right Foundation works to expose the inhumane conditions that led to the deaths of Russian service members in peacetime, as well as to help families of the dead get compensation and to punish those guilty of deaths. It also presses for an end to hazing and bullying. This NGO is mainly funded by foreign grants.

Marchenko has also worked on the journal Yunost. In 1986 she was on the show "12th Storey", broadcast by Soviet Central TV, and she was in the International Youth Movement "Next Stop Soviet" (1987-1990). In November 1998 she was awarded the Public Recognition prize, and in December 2002 the Open Society Institute in Russia awarded her the prize For Selfless Work. She also received a 2009 International Women of Courage Award.
