= Wetlook =

Appearance of wet clothing

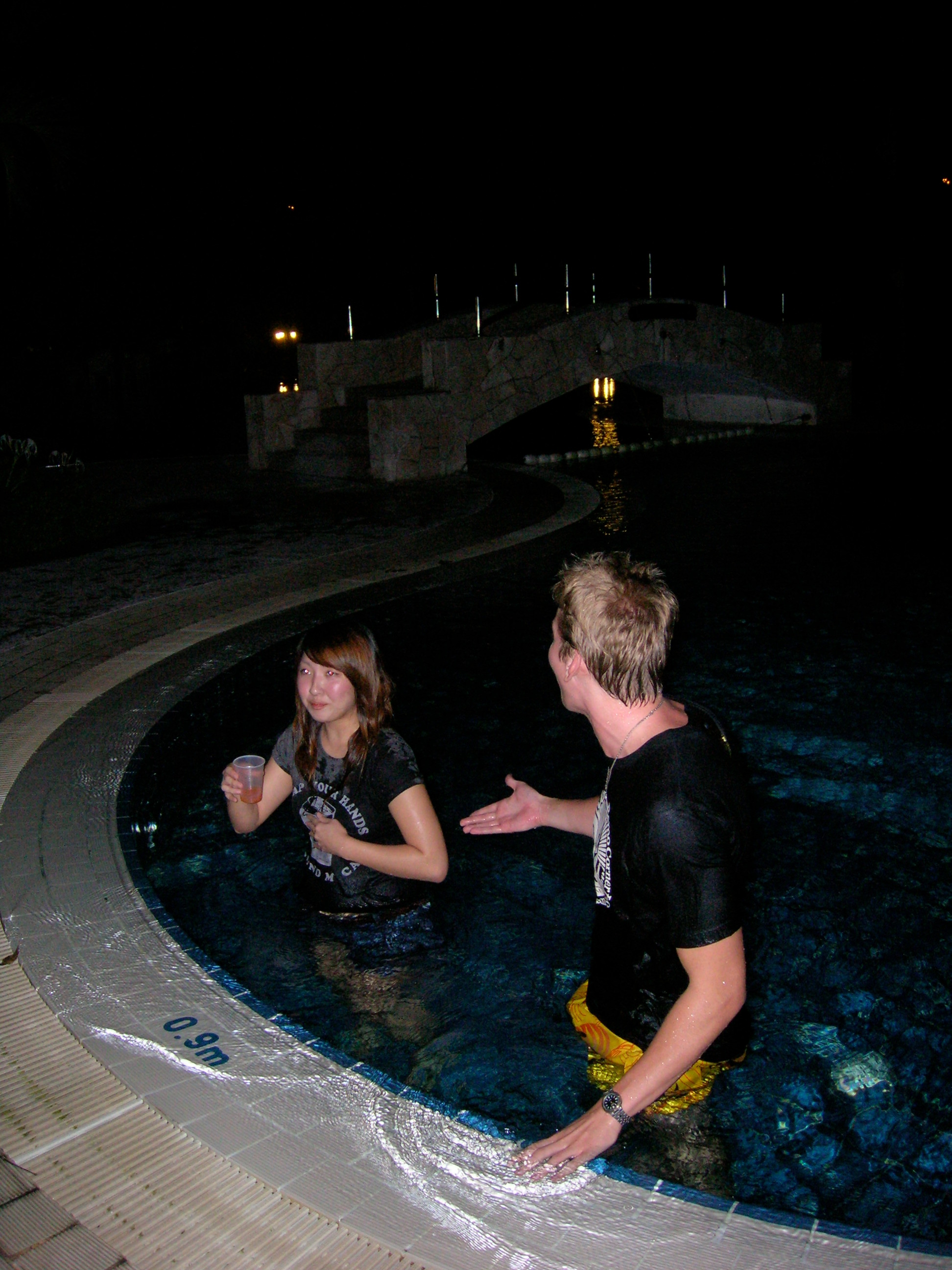
A clothed pool party

Wetlook is a paraphilic behaviour where sexual enjoyment is derived from wearing or seeing people wearing wet clothes.

== Common terminology ==
=== Phat dipping ===
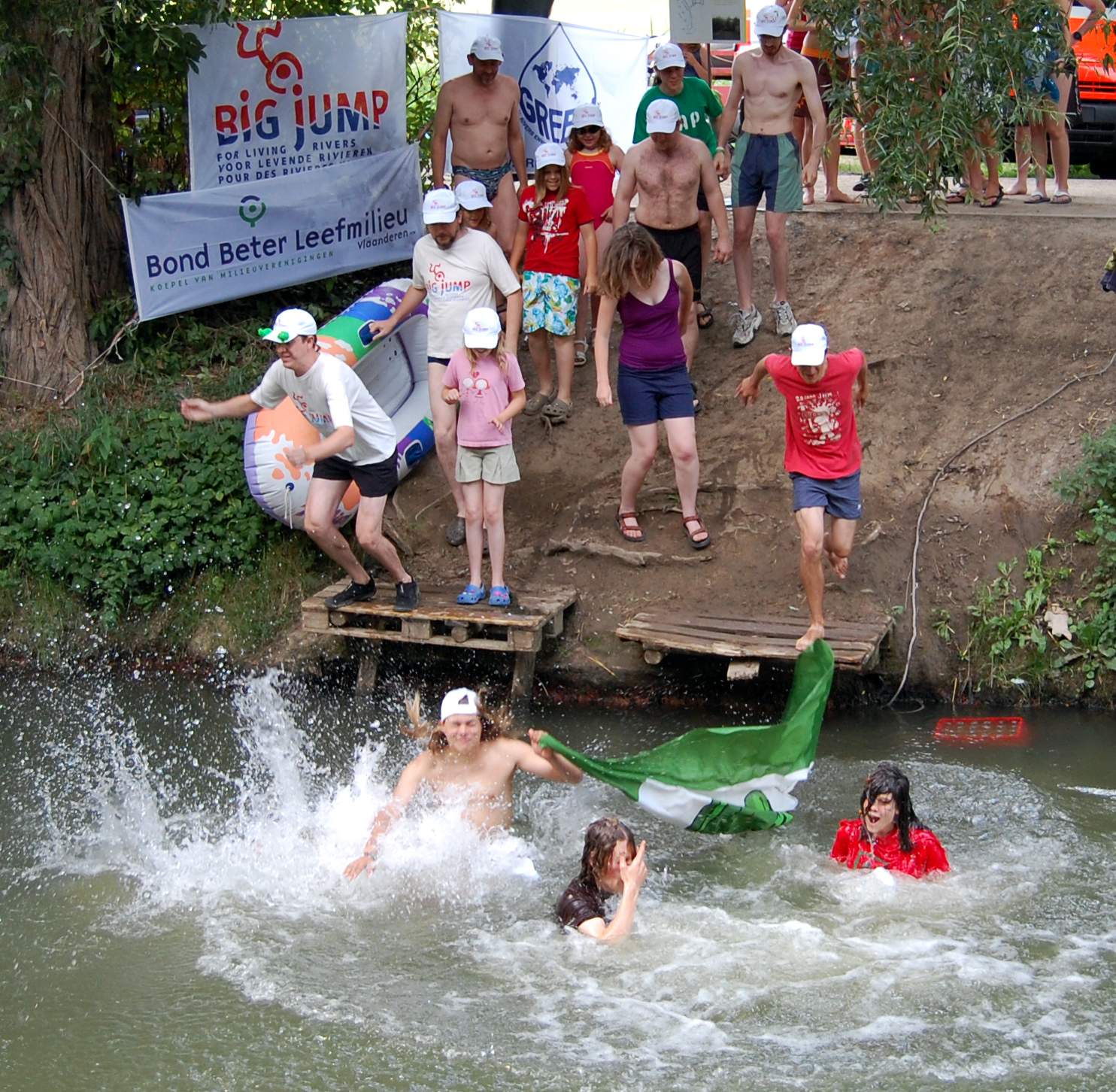
Clothed jump into a river, Belgium

The expression "phat dipping" refers to the act of jumping or diving clothed. The term originates from the 2009 rap song "Phatdippin' Rap" by duo Rhett & Link, showing people jumping fully clothed into a pool. The lyrics encourage people to jump into the water with their clothes on rather than a swimsuit. The neologism became popular, especially in the United States due to the contest organized upon the release of the song inviting viewers to upload their own version.

=== Wetfun ===
"Wetfun" refers to the enjoyment derived from the feeling of swimming clothed. This fetishistic attitude is distinct from any non-sexual enjoyment people may feel from swimming while dressed.

=== Wetlook ===
The term "wetlook" refers to the sight of wet clothes clinging to the skin.

=== Wetters ===
Online, the community refers to themselves as "wetters". Subcommunities of wetters include:

==== Get-wets ====
Wetters for whom the manner and conditions of getting wet are important, plunging them into deep emotional states.

==== Jumpers ====
Wetters who enjoys getting wet quickly or in an unintended or undeserved manner, such as being pushed into water.

==== Stay-wets ====
Wetters who keep their clothes on once out of the water.

==== Walkers ====
Wetters who enjoy getting wet slowly.

== As sexual stimuli ==
Alex Comfort writing in The Joy of Sex suggests that wetlook clothing functions as a kind of "superskin", enhancing the visual and tactile qualities of shininess and tightness, stating that if your lover "likes you to look like a cross between a snake and a seal, wear what he gives you".

According to Desmond Morris, water on the skin is seen as mimicking the sweat of sexual arousal.

The erotic aspect of the shininess can be compared to latex fetishism.

== In culture ==
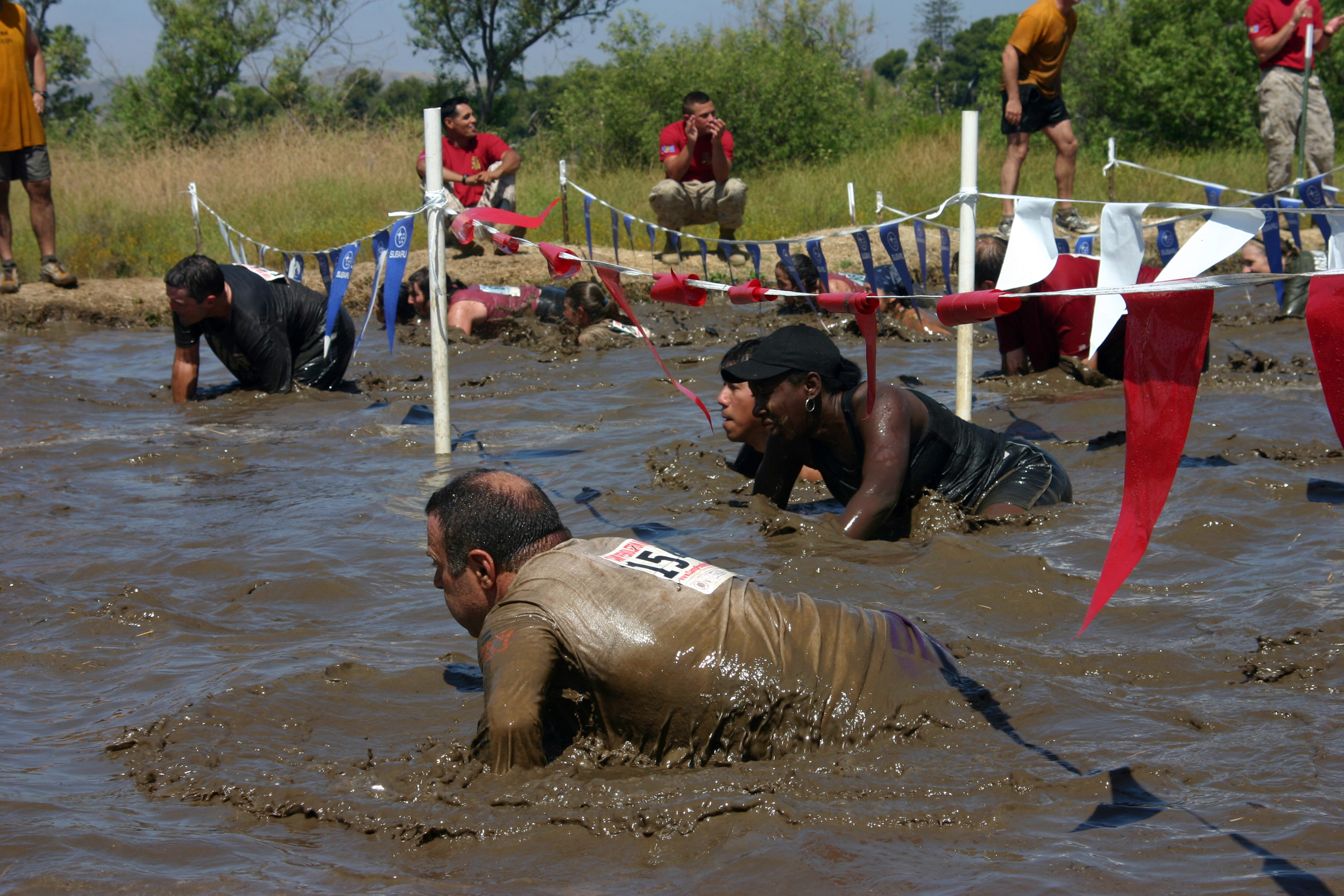
A "liquid dirt" pool, a typical obstacle in a "mud run"

In Western culture, swimming fully clothed is sometimes prohibited in public places or considered socially unacceptable.

In Denmark and Germany, wetlook has become a minor cultural movement. Meeting groups and associations organize events. The annual end-of-summer beach party in Borgentreich was a major event for wetters, and some people travel hundreds of kilometres to participate. Similar events take place regularly.

New Kingdom of Egyptian poetry has a girl telling her lover: "It is pleasant to go to the pool... That I may let you see my beauty in my tunic of finest royal linen when it is wet".

== See also ==
- Aquaphilia (fetish)
- Gunge
- Salirophilia
- Wet and messy fetishism
- Wet sari scene
- Wet T-shirt contest
