= Aquaphilia =

Aquaphilia may refer to:

- A love of water sports, such as rafting
- A preference for hydro power
- Aquaphilia (fetish), involving an attraction to swimsuits, water and submersion.
- A medical condition recognised by Central European physicians in the nineteenth century which characterised adults who liked to immerse themselves for recreation or therapy in public waters, such as rivers and lakes. In the history of malaria it was implicated as a transmission factor prior to germ theory. It was deemed important evidence to the anti-contagionist movement.
