= Food and sexuality =

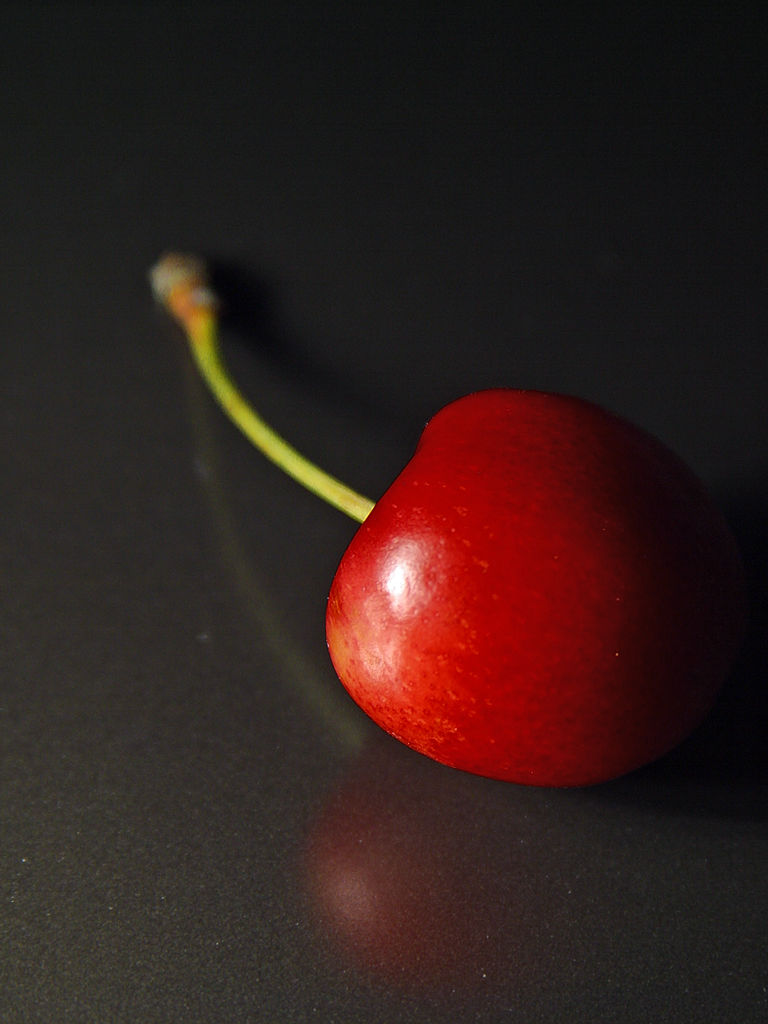
Cherries are considered a sensual and sexually symbolic food in many cultures.

Food and sexuality have been associated in various ways throughout history. Foods such as chocolate and oysters are said to be aphrodisiacs. In some cultures animal testicles and other items are consumed to increase sexual potency. Food items also provide symbolism, such as the biblical "forbidden fruit" or the cherry with its associations related to virginity. Food items are also used metaphorically in slang sexual terminology and poetry. Some foods are considered sensual for their appearance, texture, and taste. Whipped cream, melted chocolate, jam, miso, cake batter, pies, and peanut butter are sometimes used for intimate titillation in an act known as sploshing. The relationship between food and sex has also been explored in books and cinema.

== Art and literature ==
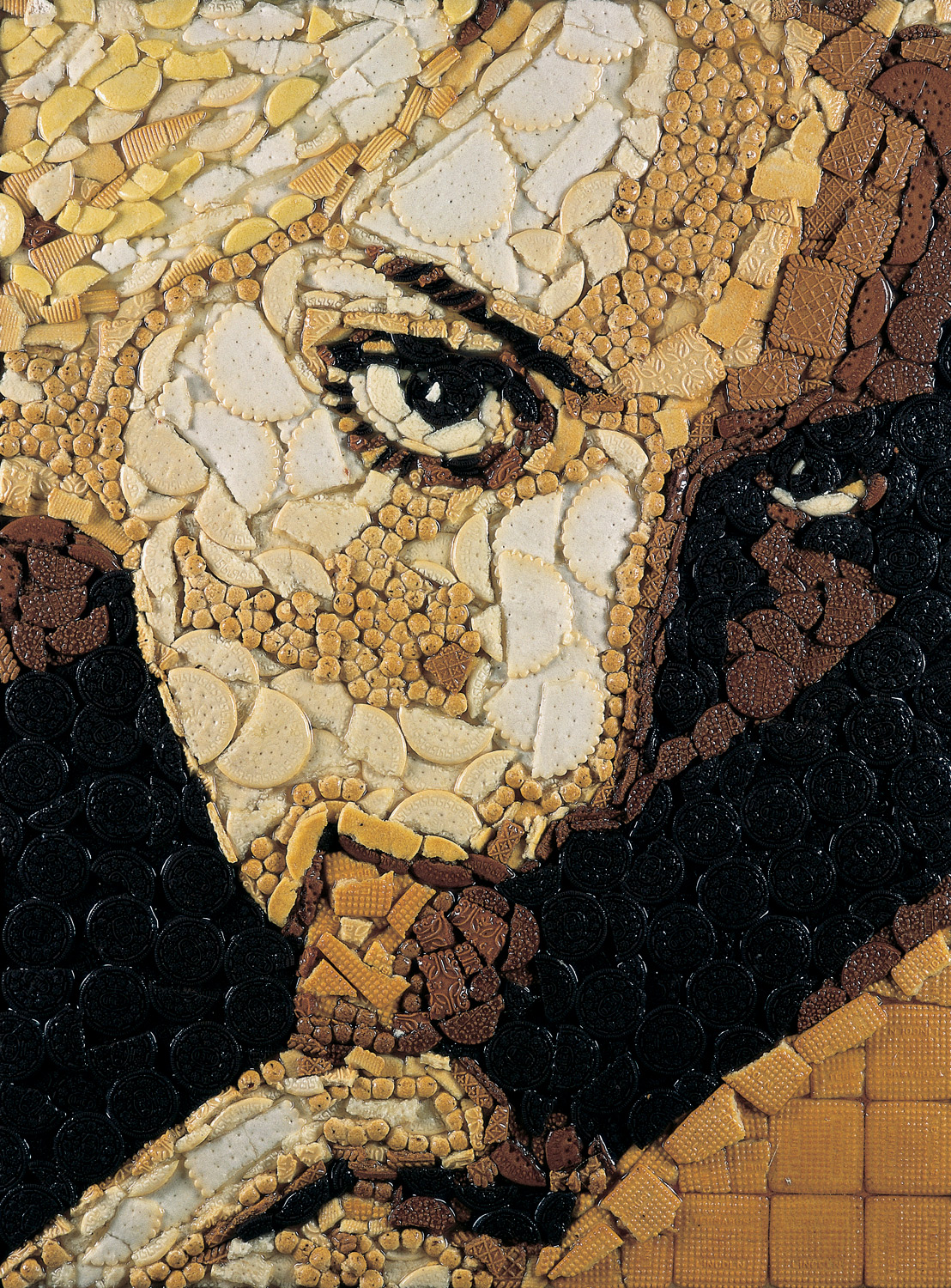
The Black Series by Argentinian collective Mondongo uses cookies and biscuits to create pornographic images.

The connection between food and sexuality has been explored in various artworks. A 1998 art show, Reflect, an exhibition of works by Monali Meher explored connections and themes including voyeurism, stereotypes, consumerism, freedom and advertising. A display of food and sex related artworks from 19th- and 20th-century American artists was one of 16 concept groupings at a New York Historical Society show in 1991.

== In sociology and anthropology ==
Tasting food, tasting freedom by Sidney Wilfred Mintz includes essays taking "an anthropological view of food, including its relationship to power, freedom, and purity." Food and Sex is also a chapter in Breaking the food seduction by Neal D. Barnard, Joanne Stepaniak. and a topic discussed in Women's conflicts about eating and sexuality by Rosalyn M. Meadow and Lillie Weiss.

== Chocolate aphrodisiac controversy ==
Although some foods qualify as aphrodisiacs and chocolate has long been thought to be one, there is some controversy over whether it truly is an aphrodisiac. A study conducted by Salonia et al. (2006) evaluated the sexual function of women who reported that they ate chocolate daily, and women who reported they did not eat chocolate. The study concluded that once scores were adjusted for age, there were no significant differences in the sexual arousal, satisfaction, desire, or distress of those who ate chocolate daily and those who did not. This indicates that chocolate consumption does not affect sexual function. Likewise, Shamloul (2010) concluded that there is little scientific evidence suggesting that natural aphrodisiacs are an effective method of enhancing sexual desire or performance, nor are they an effective treatment of sexual dysfunction. On the contrary, some studies suggest that chocolate is an aphrodisiac and claim that its chemical components, such as phenylethylamine, increase pleasure and sexual drive, and N-acylethanolamines increase sensitivity and euphoria (Afoakwa, E. 2008). Other studies suggest it is the flavonoids and serotonin found in chocolate that regulate vasoconstriction and dilation and increase female genital functioning, and thus sexual functioning (Shamloul, 2010). Given these conflicting views and the lack of current scientific evidence, it is clear that firm conclusions cannot be drawn about whether chocolate is an aphrodisiac.

== Examples in media ==
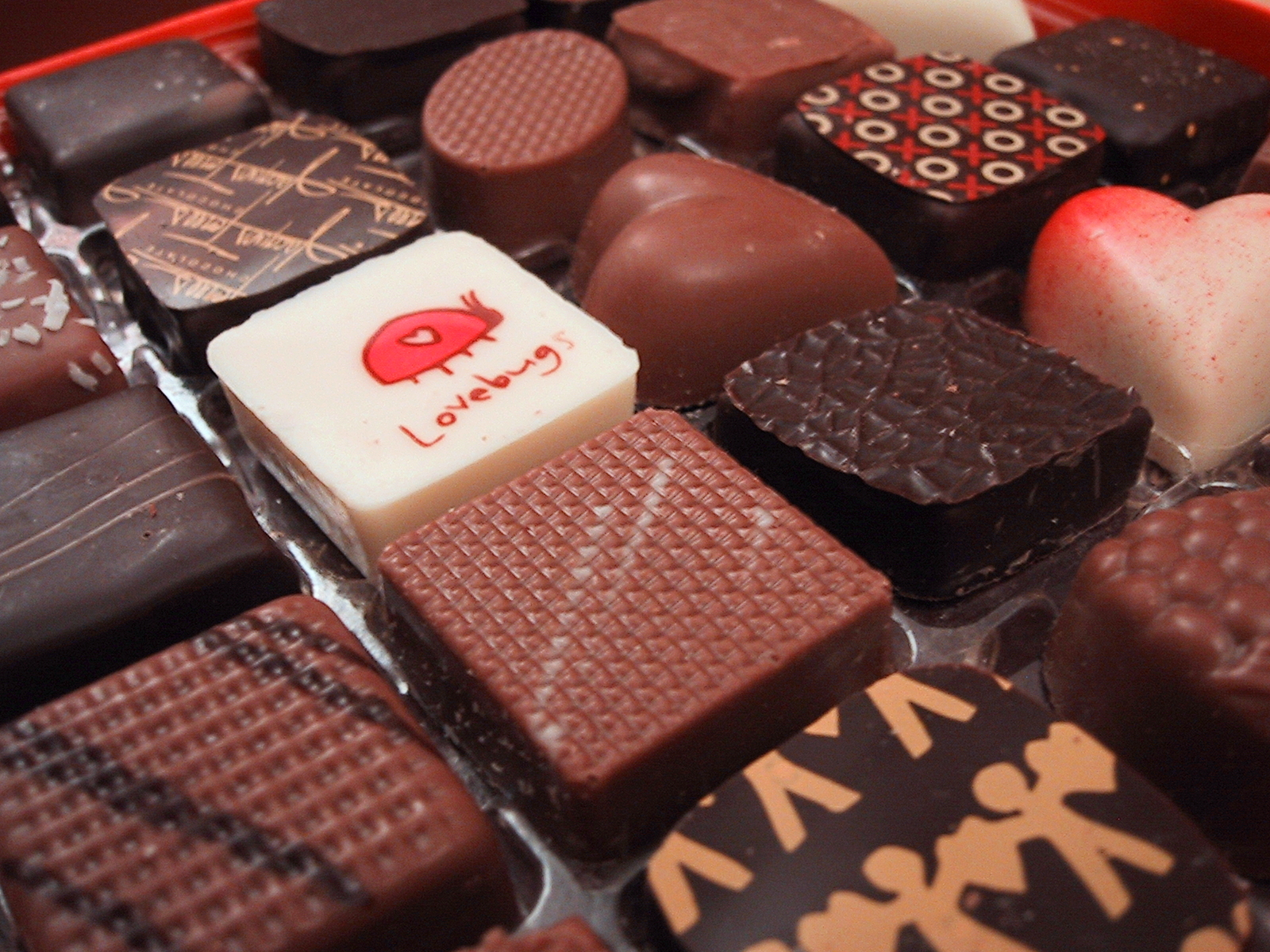
Chocolates are a traditional gift for Valentine's Day.

The movies Tampopo (1985), Like Water for Chocolate (1992), Chocolat (2000) and The Taste of Things (2024) are among those exploring the relationship between food and sexuality.

Songs that feature metaphors of food for sex include Les sucettes (1966), Le Banana Split (1979), Peaches & Cream (2001), Candy Shop (2005), Lollipop (2008) and Bon Appétit (2017). The cover of the Herb Alpert & the Tijuana Brass album Whipped Cream & Other Delights (1965) famously features a woman covered in whipped cream.

Carl's Jr. advertisements have featured a scantily clad Paris Hilton rapturously eating one of the company's burger offerings.

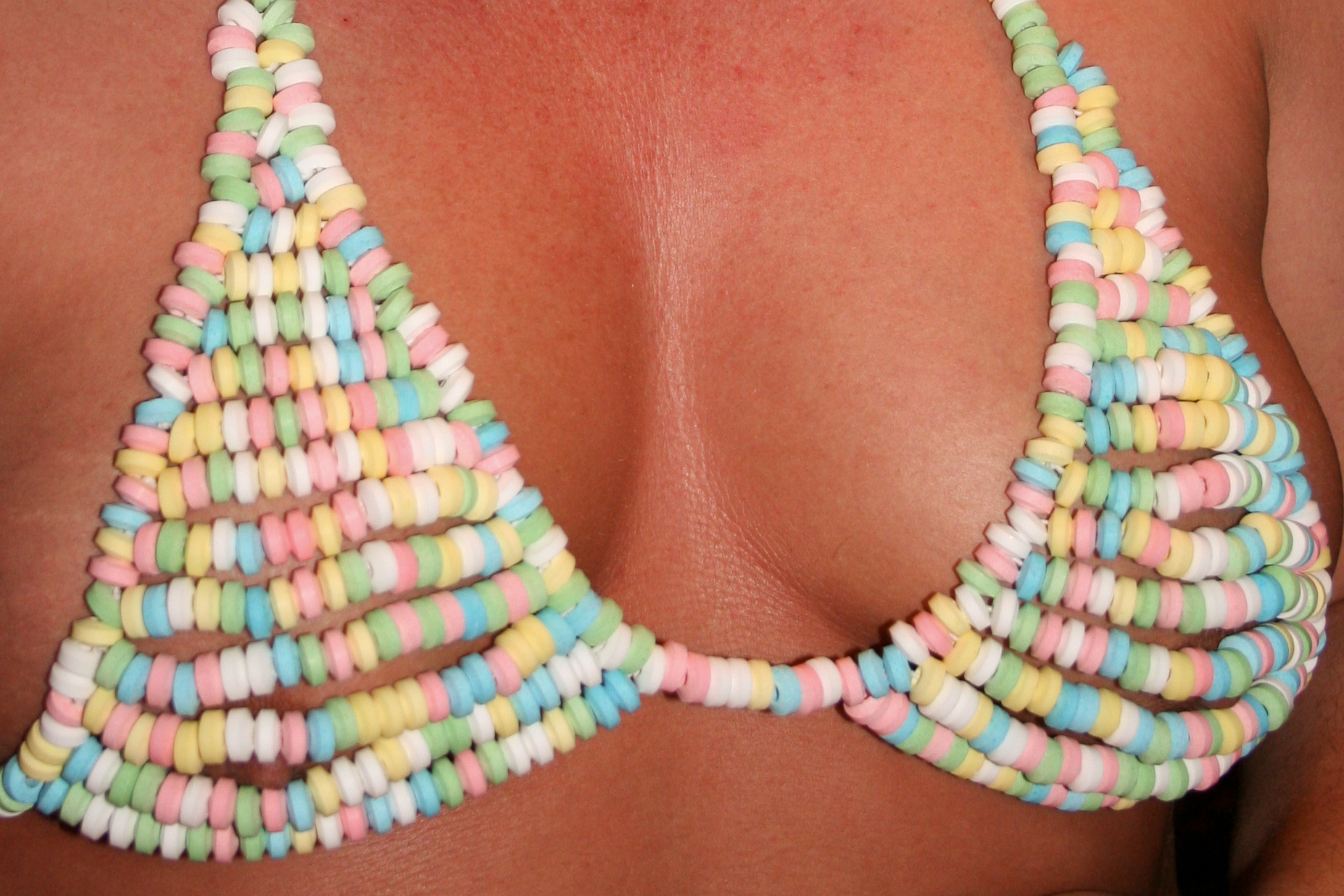
Bra made out of edible candy beads

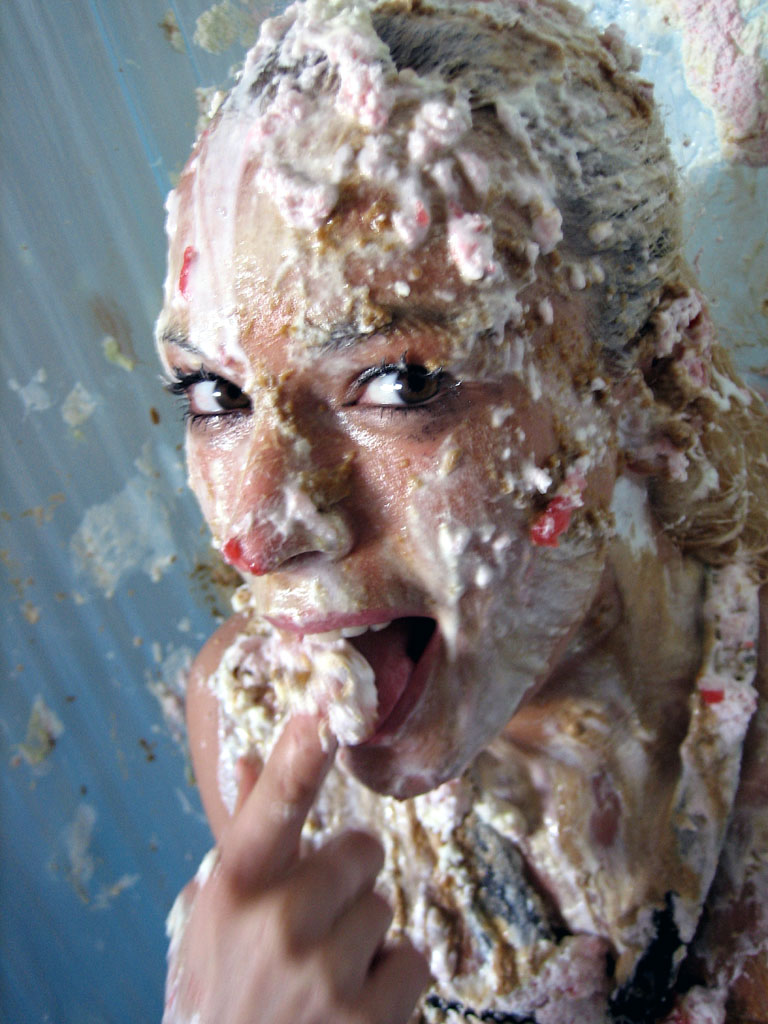
An example of food play fetishism

== Visual symbolism ==
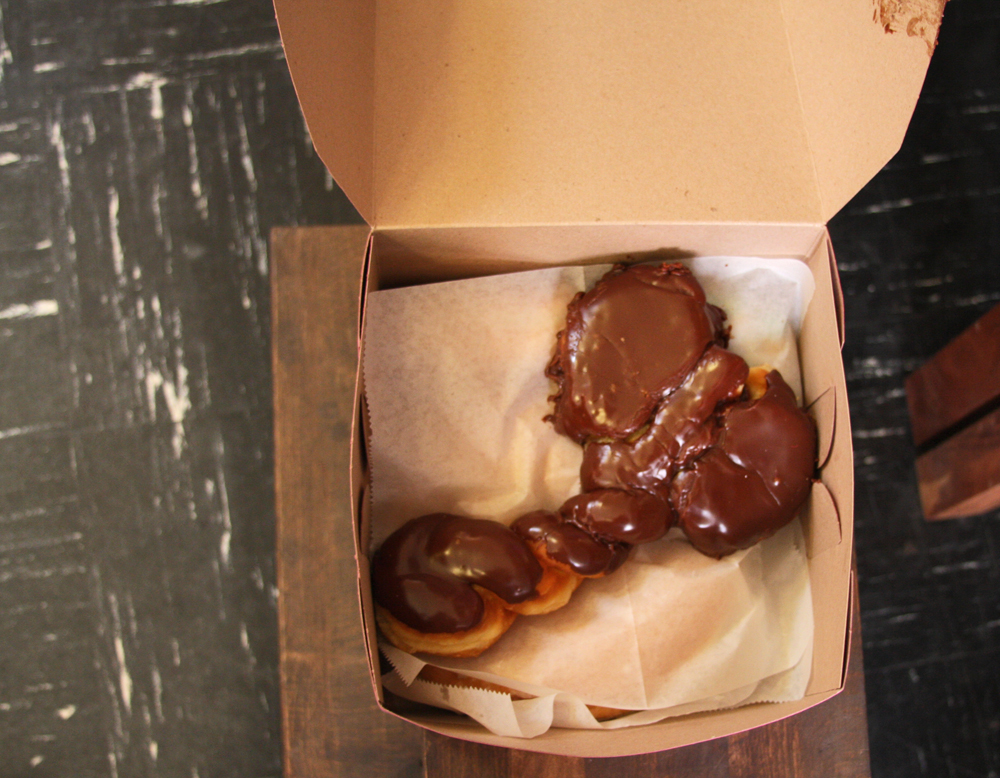
Voodoo Doughnut's variant on the Boston cream doughnut is a "cock and balls doughnut" that has cream-filled "balls".

Some foods are visually symbolic and act as metaphors for body parts involved in sexual relations. Some food items are phallic; symbolic of masculinity, potency, and fertility. Perhaps the most iconic phallic food is banana. An iconic example from popular culture is the record sleeve design by Andy Warhol for the album The Velvet Underground & Nico (1967). Another phallic food is sausage or hot dog. The film Sausage Party (2016) uses this symbolism. Other phallic food examples include carrot, corn, cucumber, eggplant and zucchini. Some food items are yonic; symbolic of femininity, receptivity, and fertility. Examples include fig, oyster, papaya, peach and pomegranate. Some food items are symbolic of breasts, like apple, melon and orange. And some food items symbolize the buttocks, such as peach. The gay film Call Me by Your Name (2017) famously sexualizes the peach through an analogy with homosexual male desire. When it comes to the use of emojis on social media, the most commonly used food-related emojis that have a sexual connotation are the eggplant emoji to refer to the penis and the peach emoji to refer to the buttocks. These usages are very popular because, on social media platforms and dating apps, people may prefer to use metaphors rather than explicit words, and food emojis enable this by being visually suggestive without being graphic.

Surrealism, psychoanalysis, and feminist criticism are the main frameworks through which such readings of sexual connotation became codified. Food symbolism often works through a combination of shape and gestures - eating, cutting, handling, peeling, wobbling. Many iconic uses are deliberately comic, excessive, or ironic, especially in modern cinema and pop art.

== See also ==
- Bread dildo
- Erotica
- Food play
- Food porn
