= Wet T-shirt contest =

Exhibitionist beauty contest

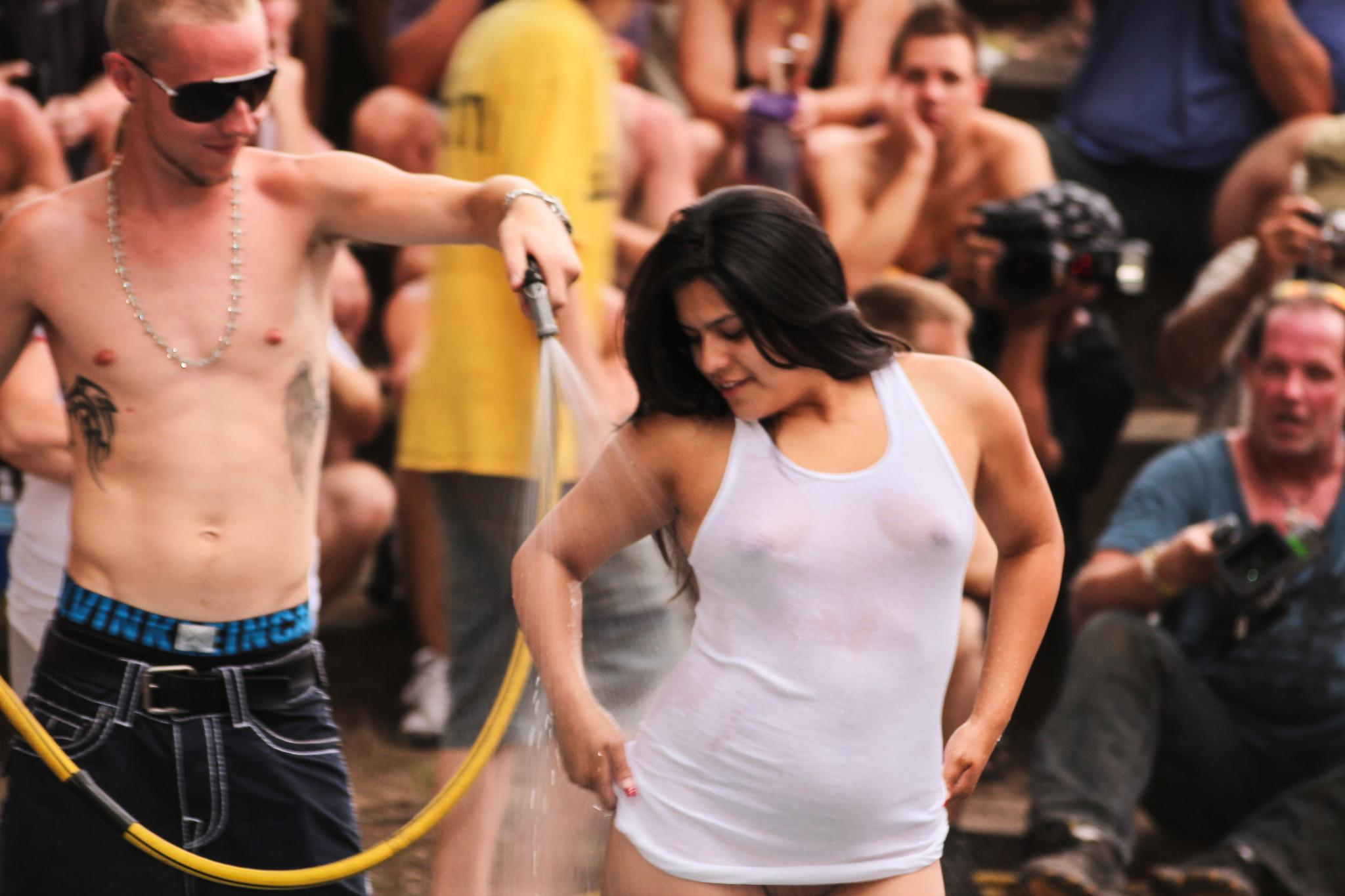
A contestant being hosed with water in a wet T-shirt contest at the Nudes-A-Poppin' pageant (2012)

A wet T-shirt contest is a competition involving exhibitionism, typically in the form of a stage show featuring young female contestants at a nightclub, bar, or resort. The contestants generally wear thin white or light-colored T-shirts without bras, bikini tops, or other undergarments beneath them. Water (often ice water) is then sprayed or poured onto the participants' chests, causing their T-shirts to turn translucent and cling to their breasts. The comparatively rarer male equivalent is the wet boxer contest, sometimes held at gay bars. In straight venues, contests involving men competing in wet briefs act more as a form of comedic entertainment.

Contestants typically take turns dancing or posing before the audience, with the outcome decided either by crowd reaction or by judges' vote. In racier contests, participants may tear or crop their T-shirts to expose their midriffs, cleavage, or the undersides of their breasts. Depending on local laws, participants may be allowed to remove their T-shirts or strip completely naked during their performance.

== History ==
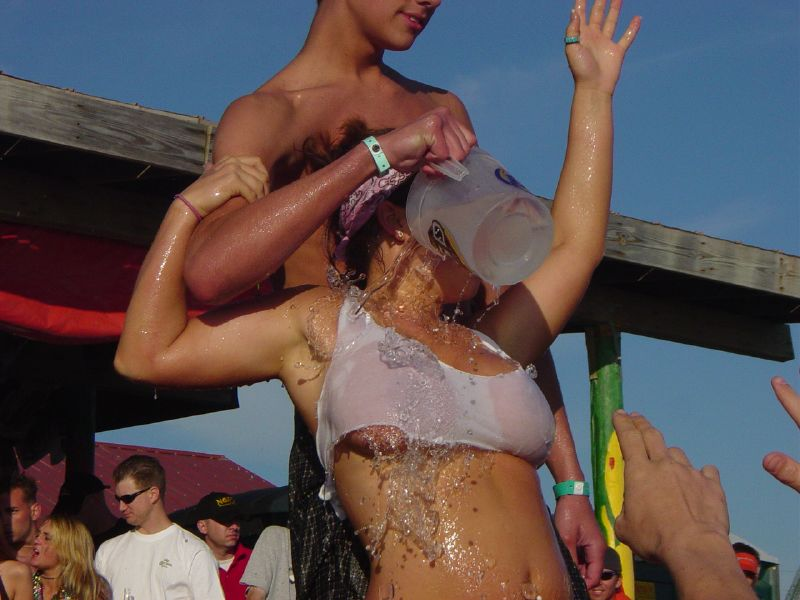
Water is poured from a jug over a contestant's breasts at a wet T-shirt event in Panama City Beach, Florida in 2004.

Wet T-shirt contests first appeared in the 1970s in the United States. (Note: The Spanish festival of La Tomatina, a large public tomato fight where participants become soaked with juice from tomatoes, has been suggested as another possible origin of the wet T-shirt contest, although La Tomatina began in 1945.) Filmmaker Dick Barrymore claims in his memoir Breaking Even to have held the first wet T-shirt contest at Sun Valley, Idaho's Boiler Room Bar in January 1971, as part of a promotion for K2 skis. The contest was promoted as a simple "T-shirt contest" in which airline stewardesses would dance to music wearing K2 promotional T-shirts. However, the first contestant to appear was a professional stripper who danced topless and the amateur contestants responded by drenching their T-shirts before competing. Barrymore held a second "K2 Wet T-Shirt Contest" in the Rusty Nail at Stowe Mountain Resort, Vermont in order to film it, despite the fact that Stowe City Council had passed a resolution banning nudity at the event. He held another promotional contest for K2 on 10 March 1971 at Aspen, Colorado's The Red Onion restaurant and bar, and the contests were featured in a pictorial in the March 1972 issue of Playboy.

The first known mention of the term wet T-shirt contest in the press occurred in 1975 in The Palm Beach Post, describing the contest's appearance at New Orleans discotheques. The contest subsequently became established at spring break events in Fort Lauderdale, Florida, with some bar owners being fined under public indecency laws for holding one. Despite a lack of clarity as to their legal status, contests began to take place elsewhere in the United States. A contest in a Milwaukee tavern in 1976 was subject to a police raid, despite contestants wearing Scotch Tape under their T-shirts as required by the police.

Jacqueline Bisset's appearance in the 1977 film The Deep, where she swam underwater wearing only a T-shirt for a top, helped to bring the wet T-shirt contest to broader public awareness. On Frank Zappa's 1979 album Joe's Garage the track "Fembot in a Wet T-Shirt" tells of Mary from Canoga Park who takes part in a wet T-shirt contest in order to raise money to return home after being abandoned by a rock group in Miami.

By the 1990s wet T-shirt contests had become common at spring break celebrations, for example in Miami and Mexico. The 2003 American reality film The Real Cancun included a wet T-shirt contest. In the 21st century the organisers of wet T-shirt contests often ban the audience from taking photographs as the combination of smartphone cameras and social media can cause problems for contestants, such as the loss of their jobs.

Nevertheless, by the mid-2010s wet T-shirt contests were on the decline in the United States and they are often seen as outdated. For example, Leverett House at Harvard University suspended its annual wet-T shirt contest following protests from Radcliffe College students and alumnae, who denounced the "archaic and barbaric" practice as out-of-touch and dehumanizing.

These contests find resistance beyond the United States as well. In South Africa, for example, local businesses and officials in Plettenberg Bay have clashed with students and festival organizers over this "disgraceful" behavior.

== Controversies ==
=== Law firm ===
In 1983, the King & Spalding law firm in Atlanta asked female summer interns attending that firm's annual picnic to participate in a wet T-shirt contest. The proposed contest was replaced with a swimsuit competition and the winner was promised a permanent job on graduation. Some participants said they felt humiliated but did not protest because they were candidates for jobs with the firm. The Wall Street Journal included details of the event in a front-page article on sex discrimination in large law firms. The fact that a wet T-shirt contest was proposed led to the case being used to demonstrate institutional sexism in law firms.

=== In-flight contest ===
In 1998, teenagers from the Northwestern United States held a wet T-shirt contest on a Boeing 727 en route to a Mexican resort, celebrating the completion of high school. One participant stated that a male flight attendant encouraged the activity and that the pilot helped judge the contest. A video showed contestants emerging from the cockpit wearing wet T-shirts. The FAA investigated the incident and found that crew members allowed the cockpit door to remain open for extended periods and allowed passengers to enter the cockpit during flight, resulting in a warning letter. The airline, Falcon Air Express, terminated two flight attendants, suspended the cockpit crew, and retrained all crew in FAA procedures. The airline later went bankrupt in 2006.

=== Underage contestants ===
Lawsuits have been filed on behalf of underaged contestants who lied about their age to participate in wet T-shirt contests.

In 2002, the parents of teenager Monica Pippin brought a federal lawsuit against Playboy Entertainment, Anheuser-Busch, Deslin Hotels, Best Buy, and other companies relating to her appearance the previous year in a Daytona Beach wet T-shirt contest, at which time she had been a 16-year-old high school student. Pippin had danced topless during the contest and had allowed men to pour jugs of water over her bare breasts. After footage of her performance began to appear in videos and on cable television, a neighbor alerted Pippin's parents, who retained a lawyer. Although Pippin admitted in court that she had lied to contest organizers about her age, her attorney claimed that, as a minor, she was unable to give informed consent to perform or be filmed topless. Pippin settled with Anheuser-Busch and Playboy in April 2006.

In a similar suit in 2007, two women sued Deslin Hotels, Girls Gone Wild, and various websites that published footage of their appearance in another 2001 Daytona Beach contest. The two girls, who were both sixteen at the time, had been filmed exposing their breasts, buttocks, and pubic areas. Like Pippin, they had lied about their age to gain admission to the contest.

== See also ==
- Aquaphilia (fetish)
- Salirophilia
- See-through clothing
- Sexual objectification
- Wet and messy fetishism
- Wet sari scene
- Wetlook
