= Splosh! =

British fetish magazine

Splosh! was originally a British fetish magazine devoted to wet and messy fetishism. It featured pictures of, and stories about, men and women in wet and messy situations. First published in 1989, it was run by Horny Hayley and Bill Shipton (a pseudonym of Clive Harris). By 2002 the magazine had around 7,000 subscribers worldwide, and the business had added a website. Splosh also evolved into a wet and messy fetish video production house, releasing a whole string of movies, originally on VHS tape, then DVD and eventually, via Internet download stores.

The magazine ended in 2001 after 40 issues, and is widely regarded as the quintessential publication on the fetish, even giving rise to the eponymous term sploshing.

Following the end of the print magazine run, the Splosh website and its associated forum rose to prominence as a counterbalance to UMD.net, the scene's dominant forum. Several of the magazine's former models took part in video sketches released as digital downloads, such as Samantha-Jane Homden, Anne-Marie Dixon and Decadent Doll.

The success of Splosh! as a magazine was featured in Episode 4 of Season 1 of the Channel 5 TV show UK Raw in 2001.

Splosh! founder Clive Harris died suddenly on 12 July 2013. Subsequently, in early 2014, the splosh.co.uk website was shut down, and on 31 March 2014 the three Splosh download stores hosted on the Vidown system, Splosh, Splosh Greatest Hits, and Splosh Messy Princess, were all shut down. It was believed at the time that the website closures would be permanent.
