= Food play =

Form of sexual fetishism

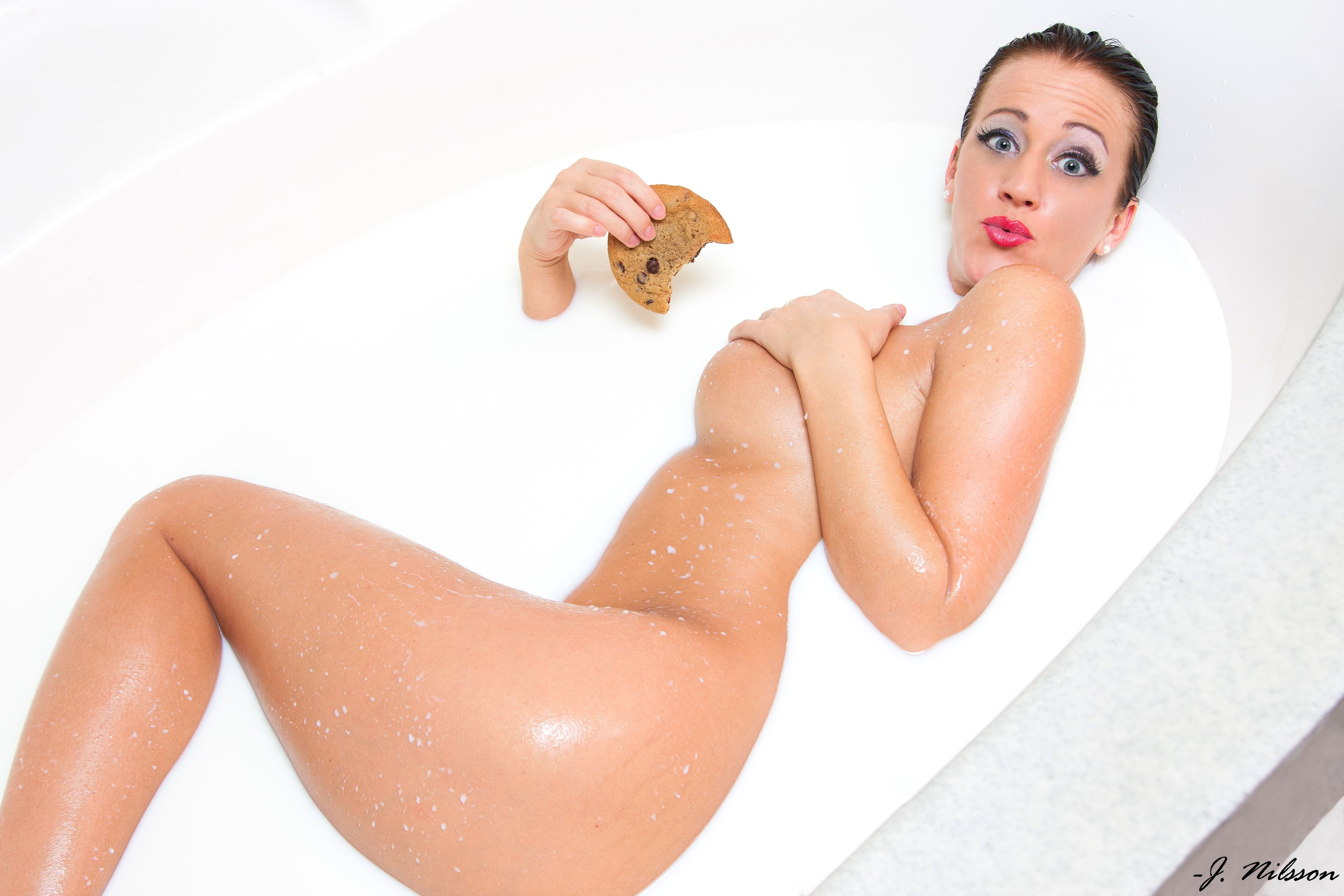
Food play involving milk

Food play, also known as sitophilia, refers to a form of sexual fetishism in which participants are aroused by erotic situations involving food.

Food play overlaps with other fetishes, including wet and messy fetishism, feederism, and nyotaimori. It is differentiated from vorarephilia in that food play fetishizes food while vore fetishizes the act of eating a living creature, or being eaten alive.

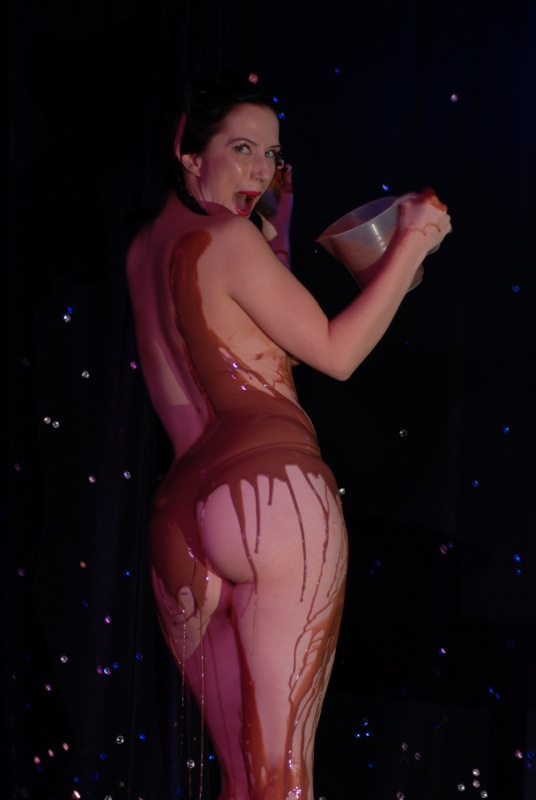
A female neo-burlesque performer pouring chocolate sauce over herself as part of a striptease

== Alcohol ==
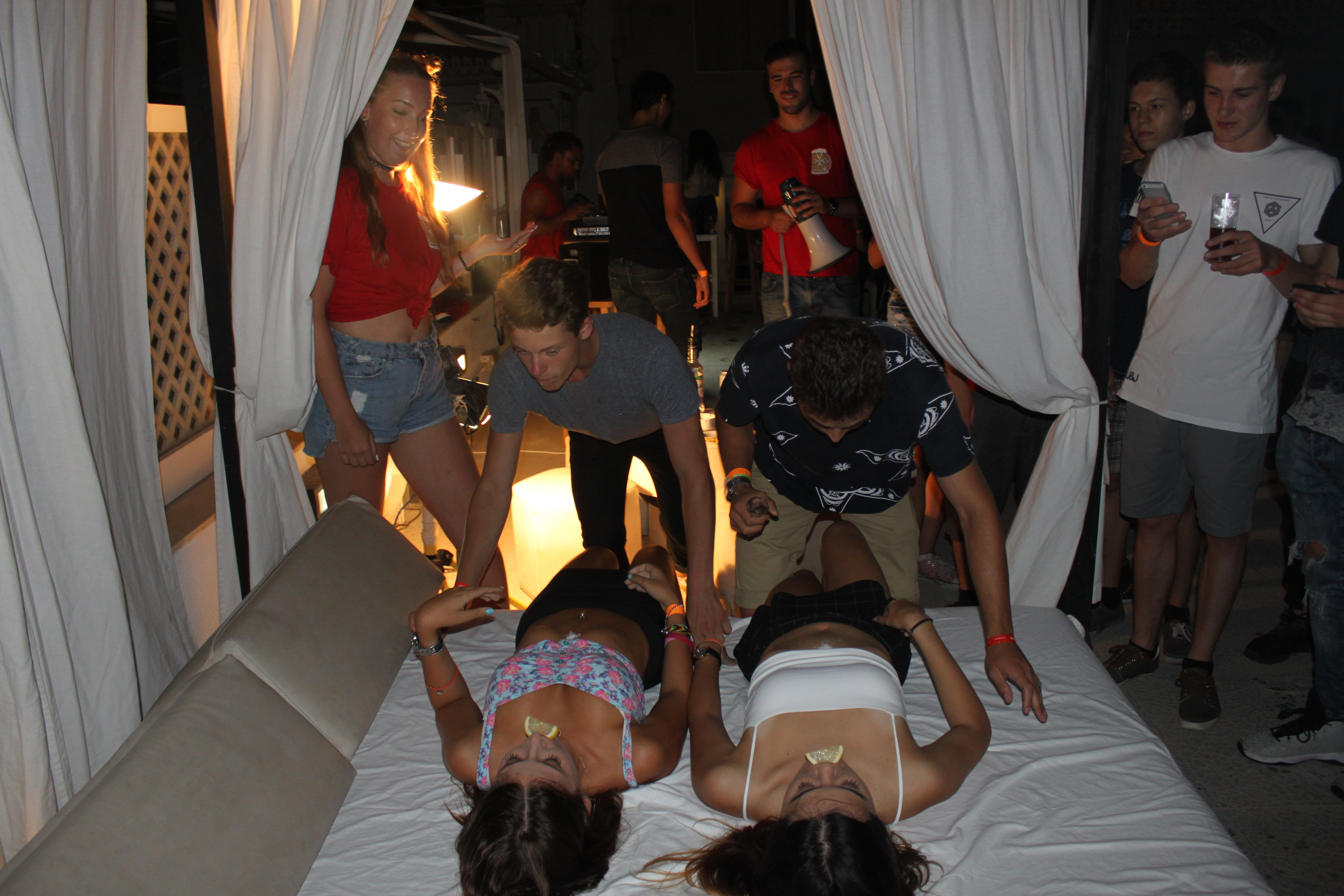
Two women getting ready for a body shot

A body shot is a shot of alcohol that is consumed from a person's body. Body shots are done either by taking a shot from a glass on a person's body, or the shot is poured onto a person's body and licked up by another person. The term "body shot" can also mean a shot drinking ritual that involves the use of another person's body, such as taking a shot from a glass and licking salt off a person's body afterwards.

Wakamezake (わかめ酒), also called wakame sake and seaweed sake, involves drinking alcohol from a woman's body. The woman closes her legs tight enough that the triangle between the thighs and mons pubis forms a cup, and then pours sake down her chest into this triangle. Her partner then drinks the sake from there. The name comes from the idea that the woman's pubic hair in the sake resembles soft seaweed (wakame) floating in the sea.

== See also ==
- Food and sexuality
- Nyotaimori
- Vorarephilia
- Wet and messy fetishism
