= Wet sari scene =

Cliché in Hindi cinema films as a proxy for nudity in mainstream Indian cinema

Wet sari scenes are an on-screen cliché in Hindi cinema films, in which fully clothed actresses are depicted in wet saris that cling to their bodies. This functions as a proxy for nudity in mainstream Indian cinema, where nudity is taboo.

Films showing wet sari scenes include Mera Naam Joker (1970), Satyam Shivam Sundaram (1978), Ram Teri Ganga Maili (1985) and Kishen Kanhaiya (1990).

== See also ==
- Wet T-shirt contest
- Wetlook
