= Bread dildo =

Ancient dildo prepared using bread

The bread dildo (Ancient Greek: ὀλισβοκόλλιξ, romanized: olisbokóllix) is a dildo prepared using bread, allegedly made in the Greco-Roman era around 2,000 years ago. Alternately, it may be a metaphorical joke based on the shape of a loaf of bread.

== Etymology ==
The Ancient Greek term kollix refers to bread, olisbos refers to a dildo, and the term olisbokollix is found as a hapax legomenon in the Ancient Greek lexicon of Hesychius "written in the fifth century A.D."

== History ==
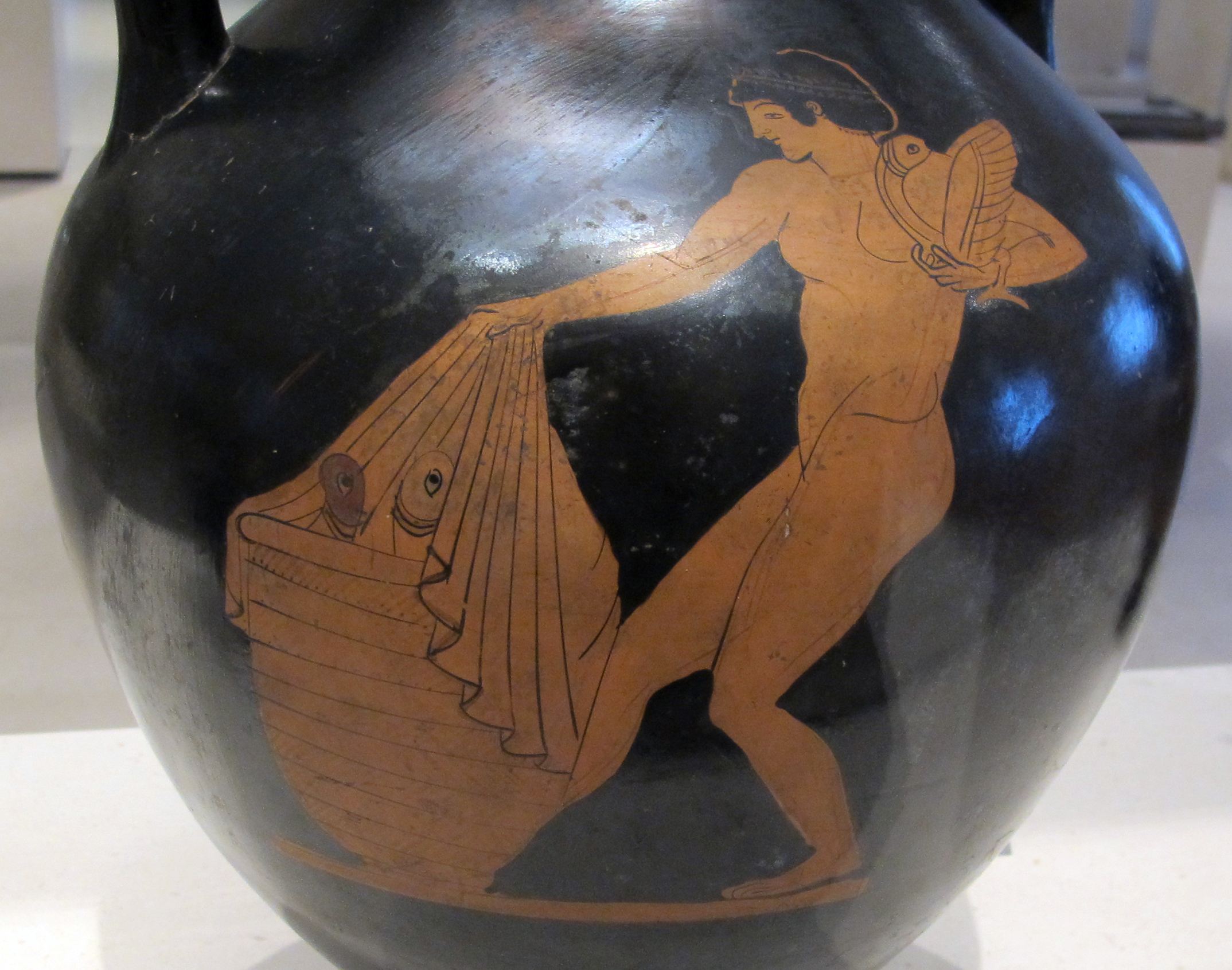
Amphora attributed to the Flying Angel Painter depicting a basket of phalli and a maiden holding a large phallus.

Oikonomides claims to identify three different red-figure paintings as depictions of "bread dildos":

- A "fragment from a red-figured cup now in Berlin," depicting a woman carrying a vase full of phalli. Oikonomides claims he is not the first to identify these as olisbokollixes, however, the source cited does not mention it.
- A belly amphora painting by the Flying Angel Painter, now in the Petit Palais, Paris, depicting a woman holding a "phallos-bird" and uncovering a jar or basket of phalli (right).
- A vase-painting by Nikosthenes now in the British Museum, depicting a woman using two "phalli-shaped objects".

== Talmudic source ==
The Babylonian Talmud offers another example where bread is used as a means to cause ejaculation.

Here the bread is used for medicinal purposes. In the text, Abba ben Joseph bar Ḥama, often referred to as "Rava" in the Talmud, asks Rav Yosef bar Hiyya a question about what to do if a man's urinary meatus, also known as the external urethral orifice, is obstructed.

Rav Yosef suggests the following remedy: "We bring warm barley bread and place it upon his anus, and owing to the heat he emits semen, and we observe what happens and see whether or not the perforation remains closed." Abaye, however, questions the method while citing Jacob, saying that such method is not necessary to examine a man's member.

== See also ==
- Food and sexuality
