= Nudes-A-Poppin' =

American annual pageant (1975–2019)

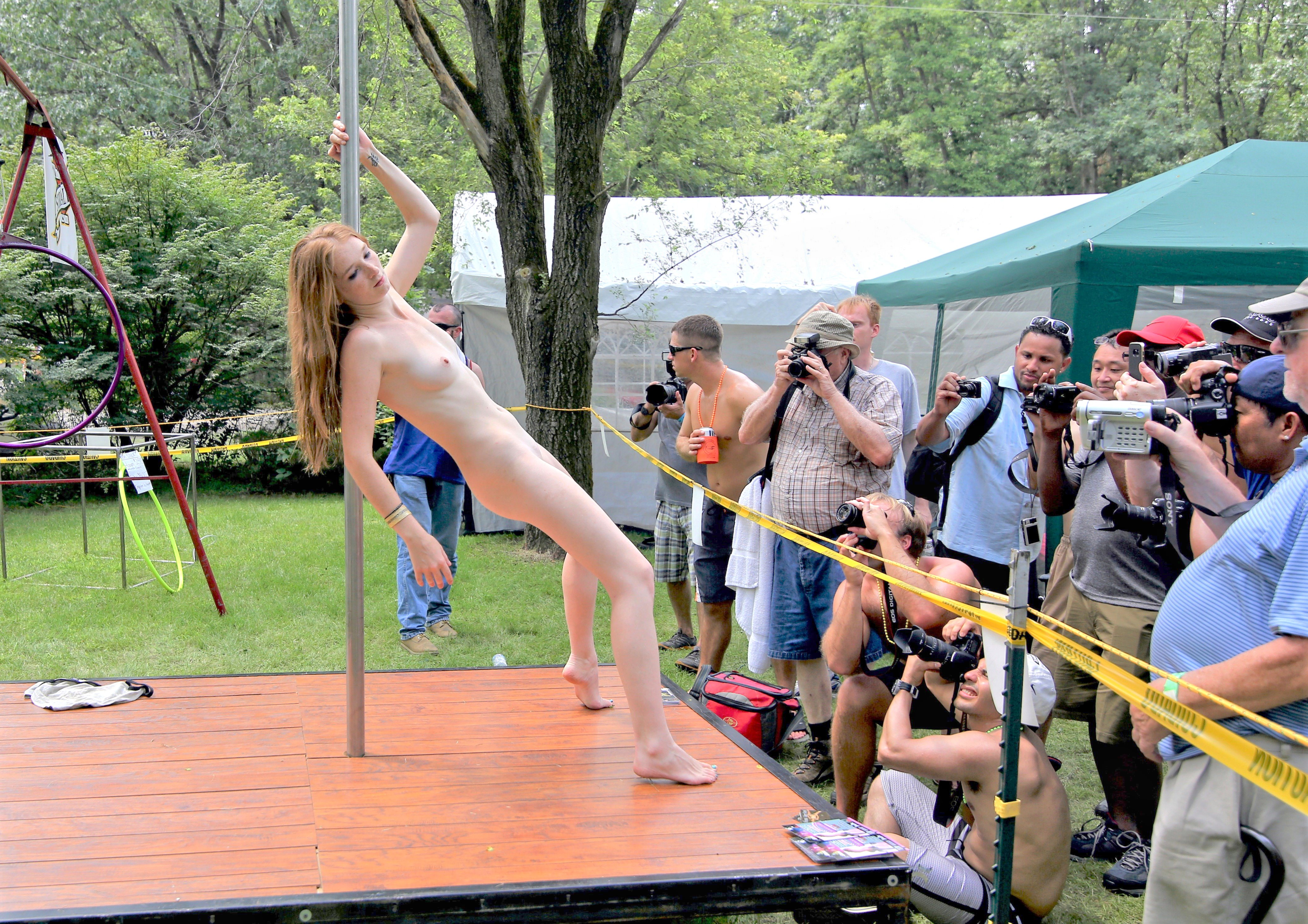
- Nikki Softskin pole dancing at Nudes-A-Poppin' 2015
- Status: Inactive
- Genre: Pageant
- Frequency: Annual
- Venue: Ponderosa Sun Club
- Location: Roselawn, Indiana
- Coordinates: 41°9′13.52″N 87°18′53.27″W
- Country: United States
- Years active: 45
- Inaugurated: 1975
- Most recent: 2019

Nudes-A-Poppin' was an annual pageant in the United States for nude women and men competing in erotic dance. It was the best-known nude event in Indiana, and was held annually from 1975 until 2019 at the Ponderosa Sun Club in Roselawn, Indiana.

== History ==
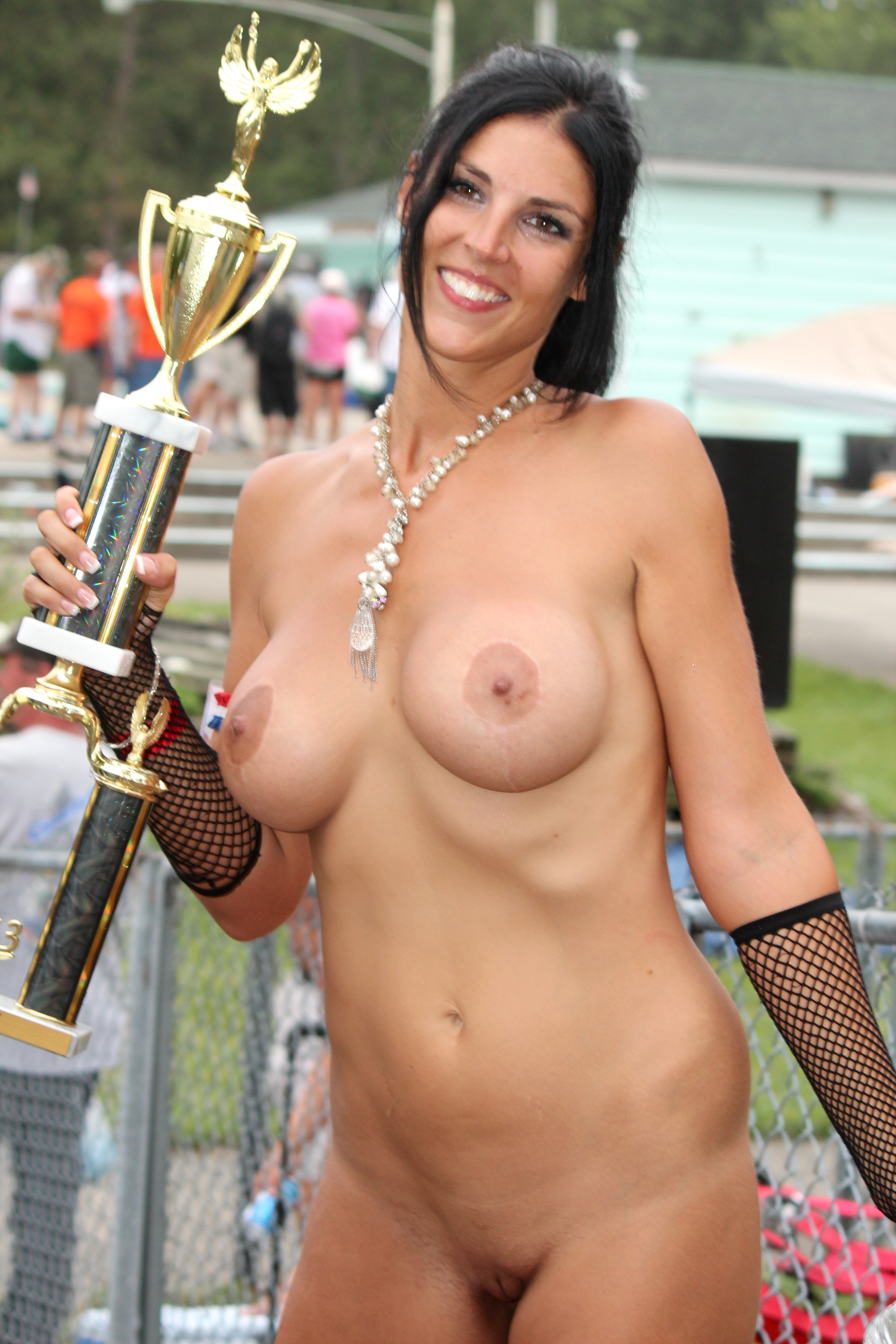
Miss Nude contest winner, Nudes-A-Poppin' 2013

The Nudes-A-Poppin' pageant was organized by and held at Ponderosa Sun Club, a family nudist resort founded in 1964 and situated in Roselawn, Indiana. The event was first held in 1975 to attract interest in the resort and was subsequently held annually until 2019. Its "Miss Nude Galaxy" beauty contest dated back to the mid-70s. Nudes-A-Poppin' served as a fund-raiser for the resort and contributed significantly to the local economy. The resort was closed to its members during the pageant, and the one-day event tickets could only be purchased separately. The attendance fee for the event was $50 in 2005 but had risen to $60 by 2016. Up to 2003, there was one event in July and another in August, but, starting in 2004, Nudes-A-Poppin' was reduced to one weekend in July. The 2019 event was the last to be held, with the 2020 and 2021 events being cancelled as a result of the COVID-19 pandemic.

== Events ==
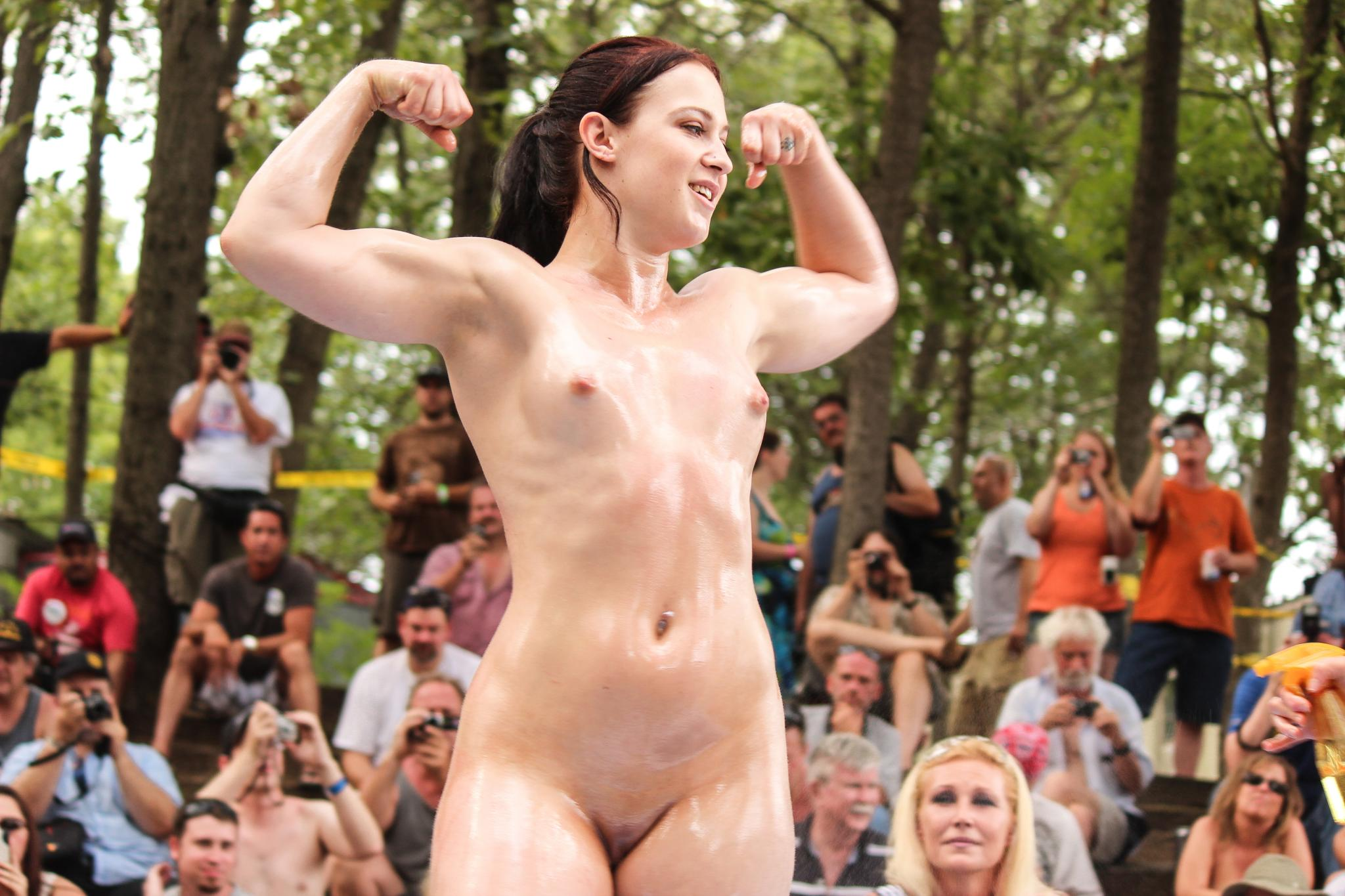
An oil-wrestling contestant at Nudes-A-Poppin' 2012 flexes her biceps

Numerous events were held at Nudes-A-Poppin' including naked oil wrestling, a wet T-shirt contest, and a sexiest pole dance competition. Contests for various "Miss Nude" titles were also held there, with trophies being awarded to the nude contestants. These included "Miss Nude" (a contest judged by the audience), "Miss Nude Galaxy", "Miss Nude Go-Go", "Miss Nude Up & Comer", "Miss Nude Rising Star", "Miss Nude Showstopper", "Miss Nude North American" and "Nude Couples Dance Contest".

Lou Harry, writing for Indianapolis Monthly, noted that the participants were prohibited from having sexual contact with another person attending the event or from performing explicitly. Most of the contestants were women. The spectators performed as judges and consisted mostly of men. Photography was a popular activity at the pageant. Spectators were allowed to take photographs but the use of video cameras required a permit.

== Attendees ==
The Ponderosa Sun Club is a family naturist resort and most of its members did not attend the festival. The members agreed to the club hosting Nudes-A-Poppin' because it subsidized their membership fees. Instead local porn stars, strippers, and nudists participate in the event, attracting thousands of other spectators. By 2017 the anticipated number of attendees was around 6,000, with the event drawing an international audience. The official website of the event stated that "no clothes are tolerated at the pool". Former porn star Ron Jeremy acted as emcee for Nudes-A-Poppin' for over three decades and personalities such as Home Improvement star Tim Allen, The Munsters star Al Lewis, and John Wayne Bobbitt also hosted the event.

== Reviews ==
In a list titled "Top 10: Sex Festivals" compiled by AskMen.com, Nudes-A-Poppin' was ranked at number four.

Roselawn, Indiana was placed 1st in the "10 Kinkiest Cities" list compiled by AlterNet.org because of this pageant, along with a high frequency of other adult festivals, adult clubs, and sexual activities such as erotic dancing, public sex, and exhibitionism.

Ponderosa Sun Club promoted Nudes-A-Poppin' as "The World's Largest Outdoor Nude Beauty Pageant".

== Gallery ==
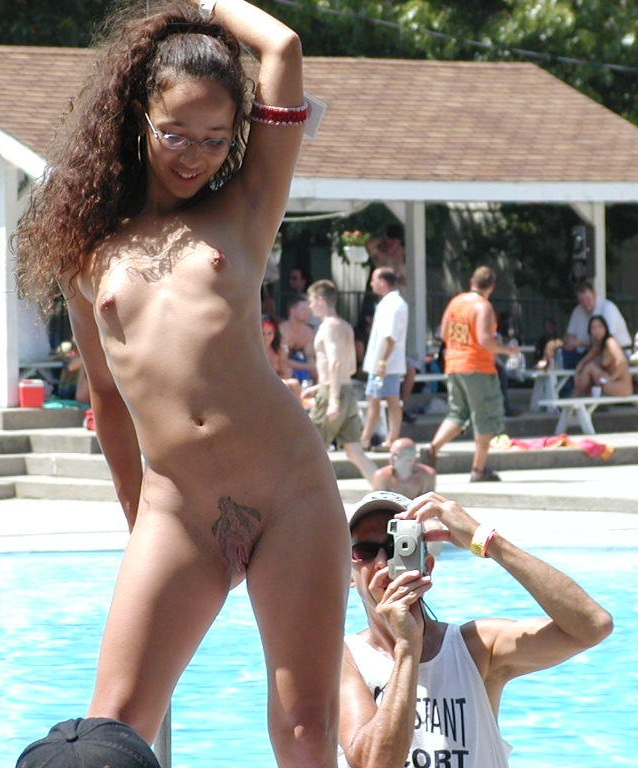
Photography at Nudes-A-Poppin' 2007

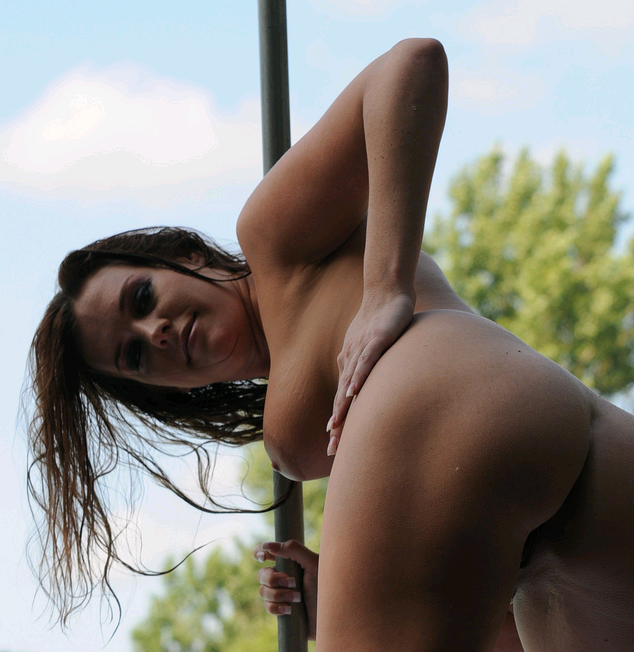
Pole dancer at Nudes-A-Poppin' 2008

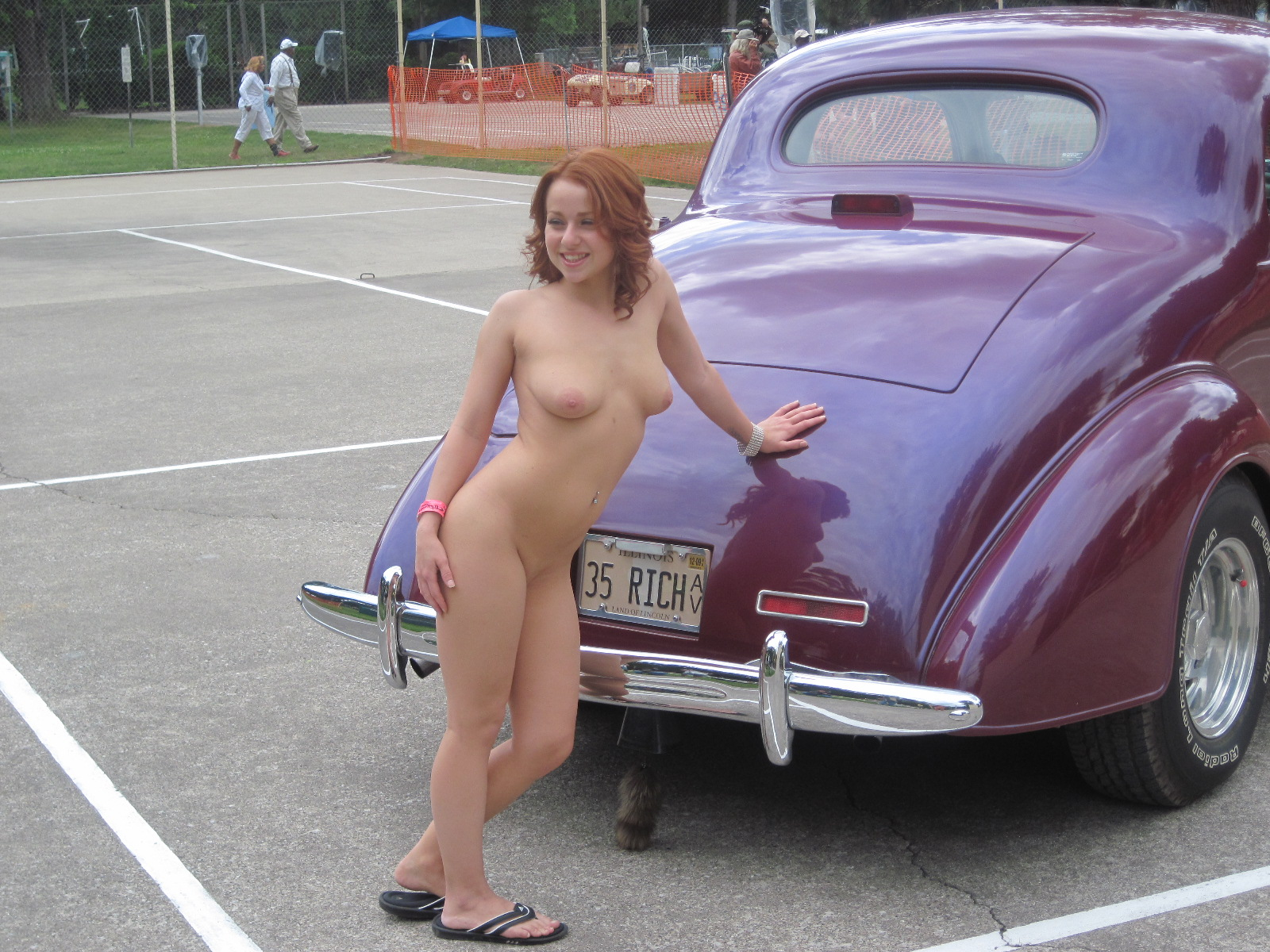
Woman posing with hot rod at Nudes-A-Poppin' 2009

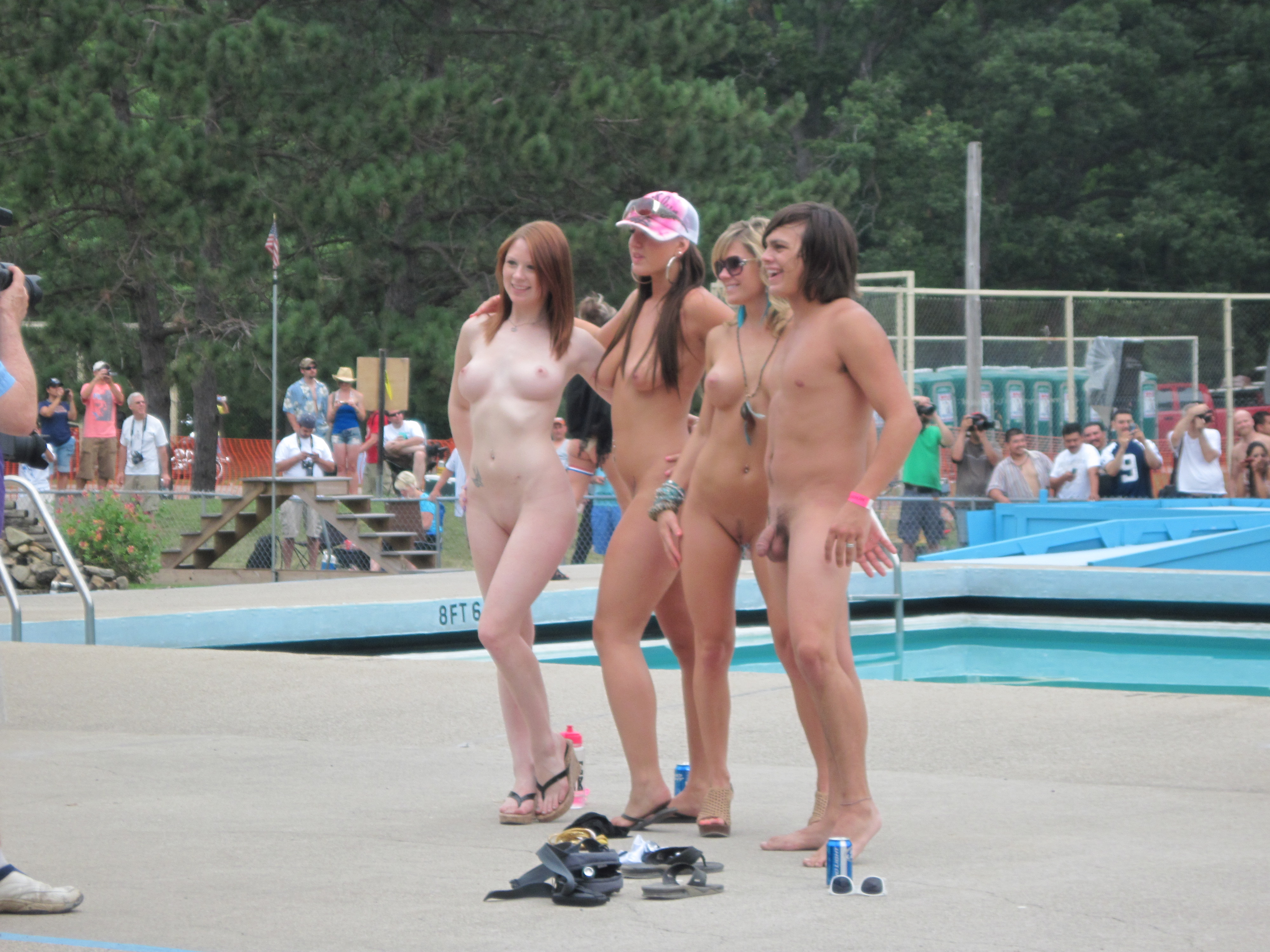
Three women and a man at Nudes-A-Poppin' 2011

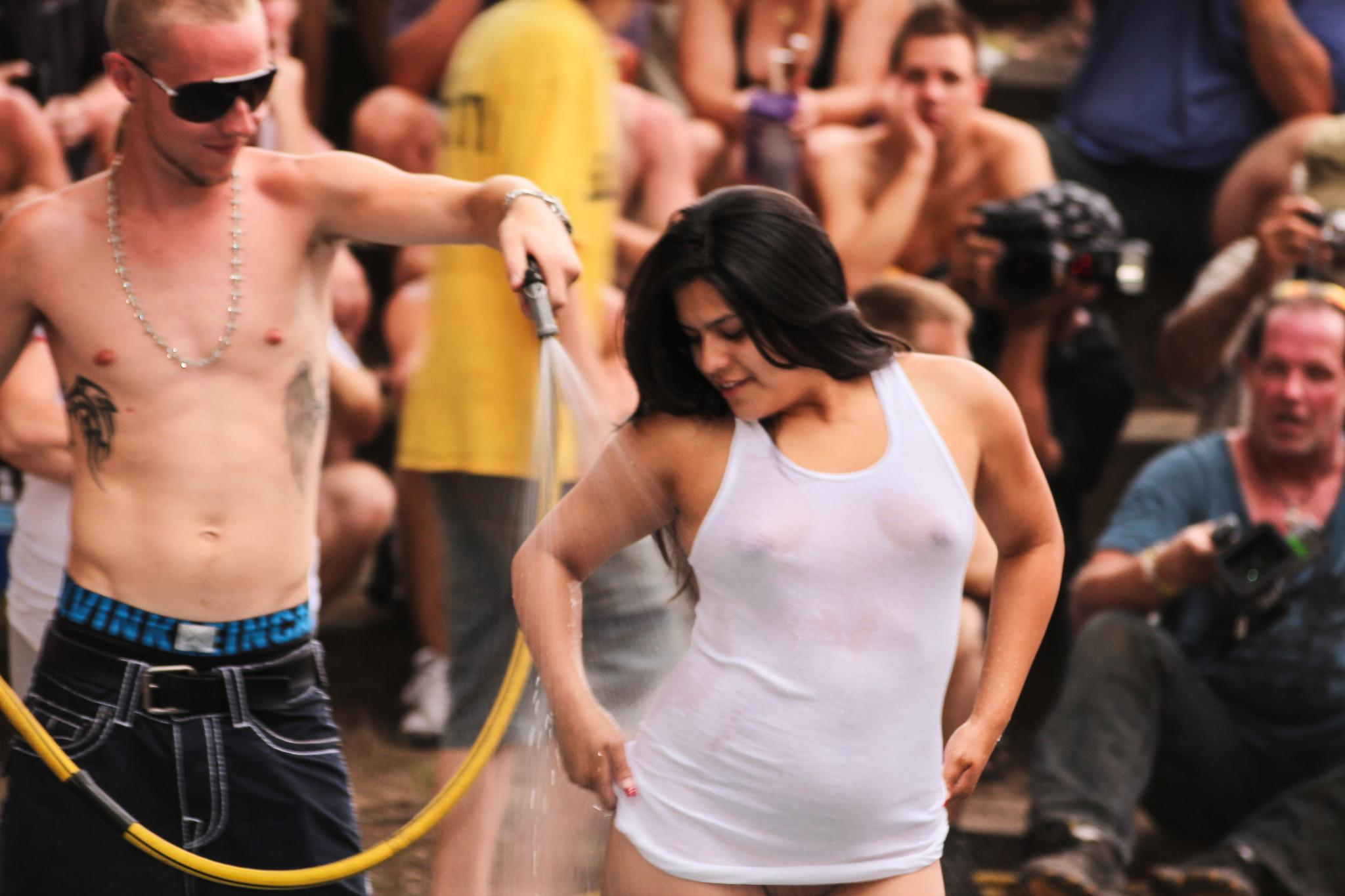
Wet T-shirt contest at Nudes-A-Poppin' 2012

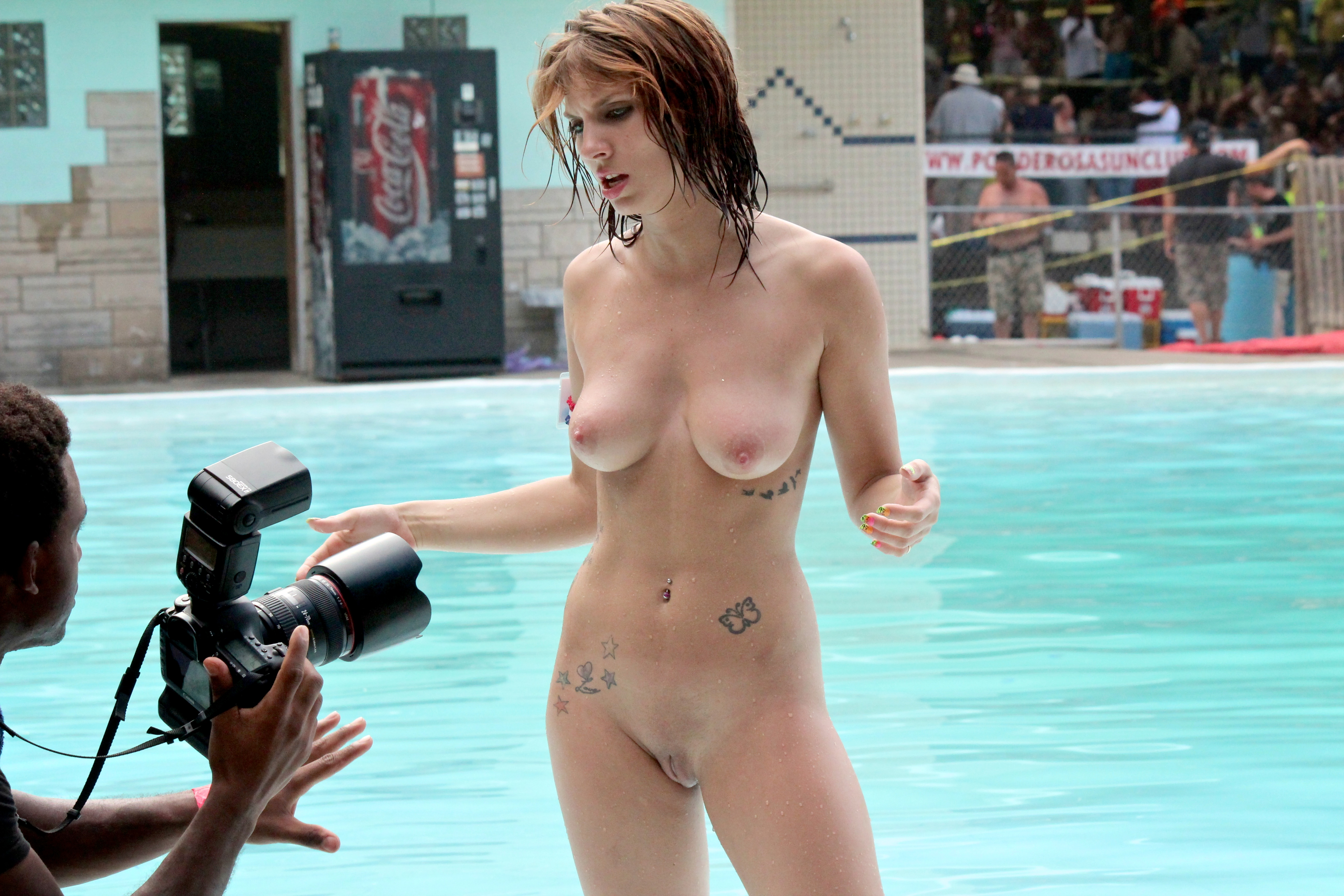
Contestant talking with photographer at Nudes-A-Poppin' 2013

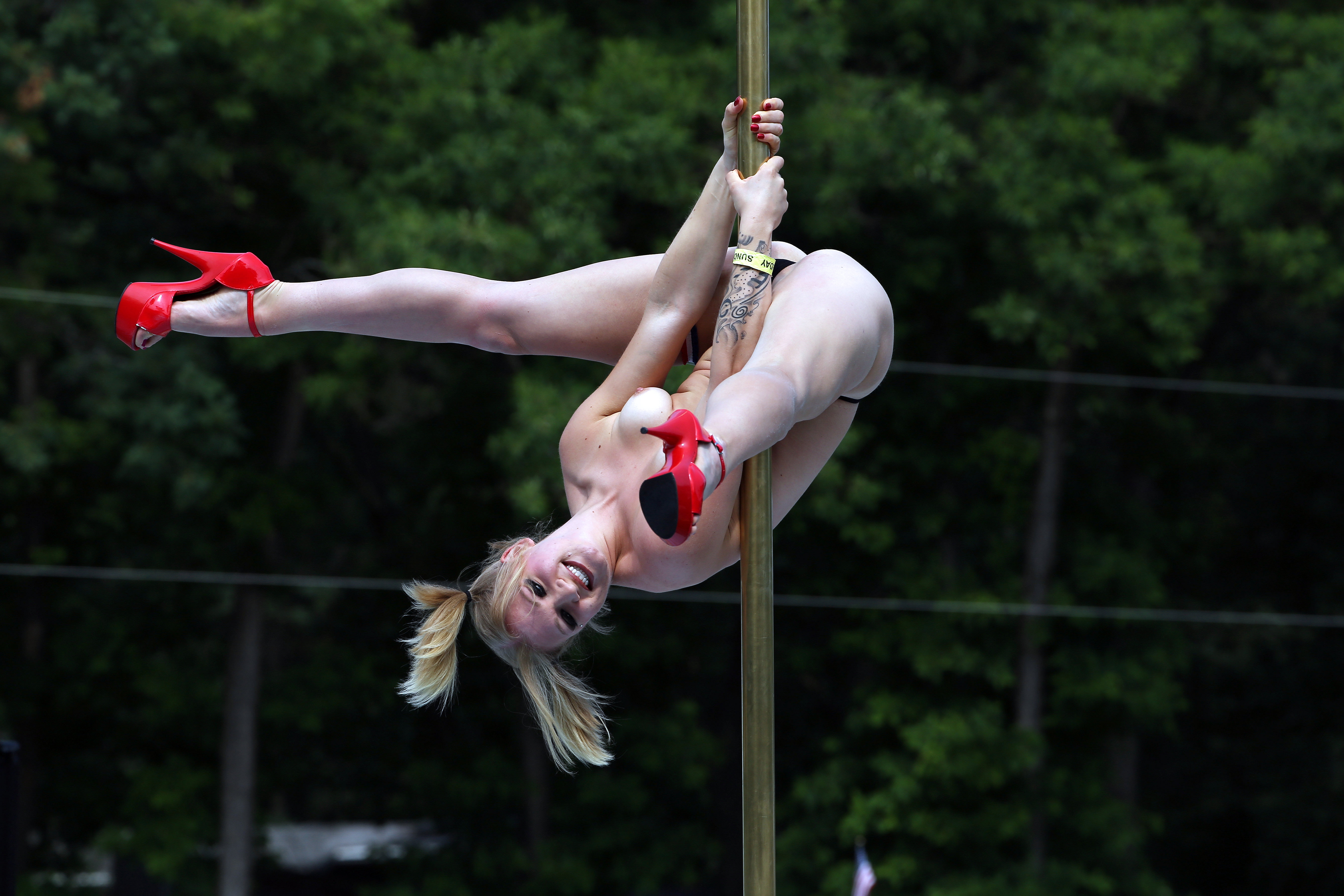
Pole dancing at Nudes-A-Poppin' 2014

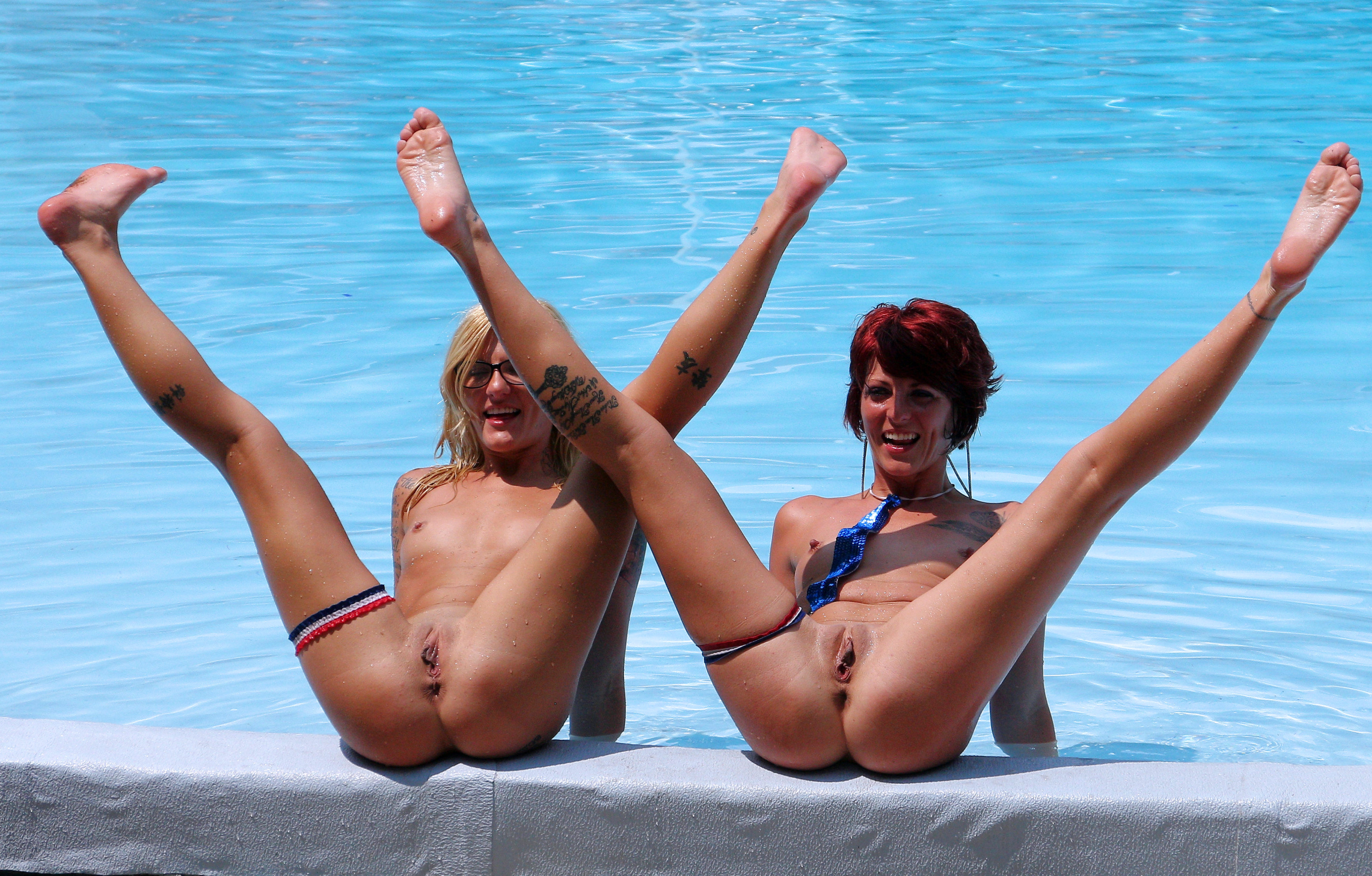
Contestants at Nudes-A-Poppin' 2015

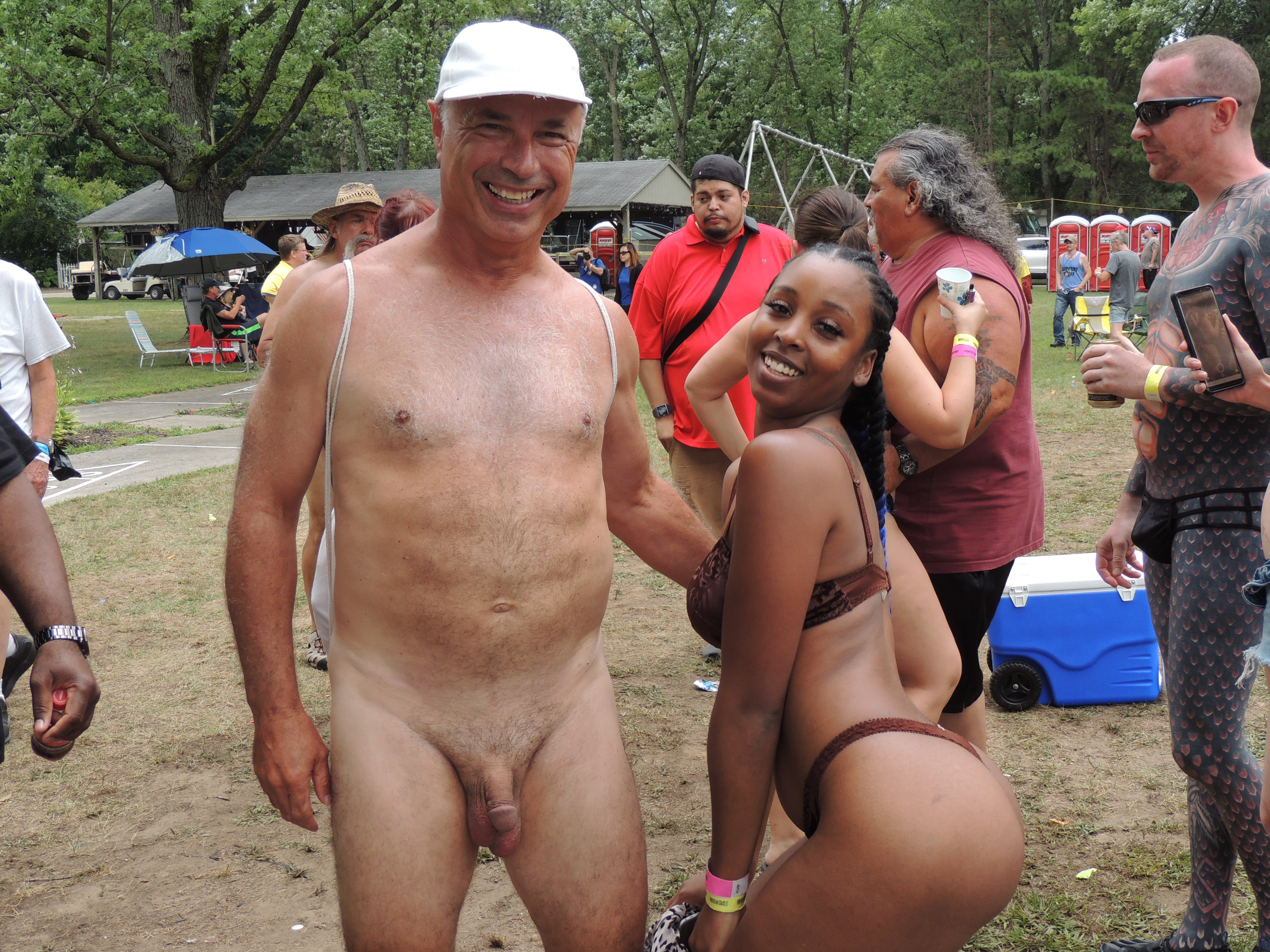
Man and woman posing at Nudes-A-Poppin' 2018

== See also ==
- King and Queen of Fantasy Fest
- Folsom Street Fair
- Miss Exotic World Pageant
- Woodstock Festival
