= Ram Teri Ganga Maili =

1985 Indian film directed by Raj Kapoor

- Theatrical release poster
- Directed by: Raj Kapoor
- Written by: Raj Kapoor; V. P. Sathe; K. K. Singh; Jyoti Swaroop
- Produced by: Randhir Kapoor
- Starring: Rajiv Kapoor; Mandakini
- Cinematography: Radhu Karmakar
- Edited by: Raj Kapoor
- Music by: Ravindra Jain
- Distributed by: R. K. Films
- Release date: 16 August 1985
- Running time: 178 minutes
- Country: India
- Language: Hindi
- Budget: ₹1.44 crore
- Box office: est. ₹19 crore

Ram Teri Ganga Maili (transl. Ram, your Ganga is tainted) is a 1985 Indian Hindi-language romantic drama film co-written and directed by Raj Kapoor. The film stars Rajiv Kapoor and Mandakini. The music was composed by Ravindra Jain. It was the last film directed by Kapoor.

Ram Teri Ganga Maili was released on 16 August 1985. The film was the highest-grossing Indian film of the year, which Box Office India classified as an "All-Time Blockbuster". It was also one of the highest-grossing Indian films of the 1980s, alongside Kranti (1981) and Maine Pyar Kiya (1989).

The film won five Filmfare Awards. The film generated controversy because of Mandakini's scenes of breastfeeding and bathing in a translucent saree. The film still received a U (Universal) certificate from the Indian Film Certification Board, which was later amended to U/A.

== Plot ==
Narendra Sahay a.k.a. "Naren" is the son of Jeeva Sahay, a rich politician in Calcutta. Naren visits Gangotri to study the source of the holy river Ganga, and to get some holy water for his wheelchair-using paternal grandmother. There, he meets a very pretty girl named Ganga Singh. Ganga lives near Gangotri with her brother, Karam. Naren sees Ganga bathing in a white saree under the waterfall and she later helps him to collect the holy water. Soon, they fall in love, decide to marry and consummate. They are happily married but Naren has to return to Calcutta as he wanted to convince his parents about accepting Ganga as their daughter-in-law. He promises Ganga that he will soon return to her.

Ganga is pregnant with Naren's child and she gives birth to a son. She faces many problems because of her child as well as her beauty. Her brother Karam is killed and Ganga finds herself alone. Finally deciding to go to her husband, Ganga travels from Gangotri to Calcutta. However, the journey is fraught with hardship and misadventures. She makes it as far as Benaras, and is helped by police with a ticket to Calcutta. However, she falls into the clutches of a man who lures her to a brothel.

Bhagwat Choudhary, a rich politician, buys Ganga and brings her to his "bagan bari" (house near a garden) as a concubine. Bhagwat has arranged for his daughter, Radha to wed to Naren, who was informed that Ganga is dead. However, Naren's maternal uncle, Kunj Bihari, finds Ganga in Bhagwat's bagan bari and learns her story. He asks her to appear at her husband's wedding to test if her husband can recognize her or not.

Naren recognizes Ganga at the ceremony. However, his father refuses to accept Ganga as his daughter-in-law. Naren also finds out about his son and the three try to leave. However, Bhagwat Choudhary shoots Ganga in a fit of rage, causing Naren to thrash Bhagwat Choudhary. Radha then informs him that Ganga has survived and Naren leaves with Ganga and their son to live by the river Ganga.

== Cast ==
- Rajiv Kapoor as Narendra "Naren" Sahay, Ganga's husband, Radha's love interest
- Mandakini as Ganga Sahay, Naren's wife
- Divya Rana as Radha B. Choudhary, Naren's fiancee
- Sushma Seth as Dadi Maa
- Saeed Jaffrey as Kunj Bihari
- Kulbhushan Kharbanda as Jeeva Sahay
- Raza Murad as Bhagwat Choudhary
- Geeta Siddharth as Mrs. Sahay
- Trilok Kapoor as Professor
- Krishan Dhawan as Manilal
- Vishwa Mehra as Postbabu
- Urmila Bhatt as Tajeshwari Bai
- A. K. Hangal as Brij Kishore
- Gautam Sarin as Naren's classmate
- Monty Nath as Naren's classmate who lost his watch
- Kamaldeep as Chamanlal
- Tom Alter as Karam Singh, Ganga's elder brother
- Javed Khan Amrohi as Manglu, Ganga's fiancé

== Production ==
According to Padmini Kolhapure, she was the initial choice for the female lead role but declined because the script had a kissing scene. Mandakini, who ultimately played the role, disputed Kolhapure's claims. She said Raj Kapoor wanted only a new face, rather than an established actress, as he believed he could not "make someone pure Ganga if they have an established image". Mandakini also stated that she did not breastfeed despite popular belief, but the scene was shot in a way to suggest that. in 2025, Khusboo revealed that she was first choice for playing Ganga.

The inspiration for this movie is the song 'Ek Radha, Ek Meera', about the differing kinds of love for Krishna from Radha and Meera. The song had been written and composed by then new music director Ravindra Jain. Upon hearing the song (being sung on the stage by Ravindra Jain himself) at a wedding, Raj Kapoor was struck by the song. He later invited the singer to sing the same song to him again. Thus was born a movie, from the love of a song. The entire movie was conceived from that one song. This incident was narrated by Randhir Kapoor, who had accompanied his father to that wedding.

== Cultural allusions ==
According to Philip Lutgendorf, the movie is an allegory that "synthesizes classical and mythic narrative, soft-core political and social commentary (here condemning the corruption of politicians and capitalists and championing the nascent environmental initiatives of Prime Minister Rajiv Gandhi). The narrative recapitulates the Abhijñānaśākuntalam story that first appeared in the epic Mahabharata and then was reworked, some six hundred years later, by the poet Kalidasa."

== Reception ==
Ram Teri Ganga Maili performed well at the box office, becoming the highest-grossing Indian film of the year, which Box Office India classified as an "All-Time Blockbuster". It collected a nett amount of ₹9.5 crore.

The film also caused a stir because of two scenes: one in which Mandakini bathes under a waterfall wearing only a flimsy white saree through which her breasts are partially visible and another in which she is shown breast-feeding a child. Some critics claimed that the scenes were vulgar and exploitative, and were used to get around the Censor Board's stringent rules against nudity. Kapoor defended the inclusion of the scenes stating that they were tasteful.

== Awards ==
33rd Filmfare Awards:

Won

- Best Film – Randhir Kapoor
- Best Director – Raj Kapoor
- Best Music Director – Ravindra Jain
- Best Art Direction – Suresh J. Sawant
- Best Editing – Raj Kapoor

Nominated

- Best Actress – Mandakini
- Best Supporting Actor – Saeed Jaffrey
- Best Lyricist – Hasrat Jaipuri for "Sun Sahiba Sun"
- Best Male Playback Singer – Suresh Wadkar for "Main Hi Main Hoon"
- Best Story – Raj Kapoor

== Songs ==
Music of this movie was given by late Ravindra Jain, who won Fimfare Award for Best Music Director for this.

1. "Ek Dukhiyari Kahe" – Lata Mangeshkar Lyrics-Ravindra Jain
2. "Ek Radha Ek Meera" – Lata Mangeshkar, Lyrics-Ravindra Jain, Raga Kirwani
3. "Husn Pahadon Ka" – Lata Mangeshkar, Suresh Wadkar, Lyrics-Ravindra Jain, Raga Pahadi
4. "Ram Teri Ganga Maili Ho Gayee" – Part 1 – Suresh Wadkar Lyrics-Ravindra Jain, Raga Ahir Bhairav
5. "Sun Sahiba Sun Pyaar Ki Dhun Maine Tujhe Chun Liya" – Lata Mangeshkar & chorus; Lyrics – Hasrat Jaipuri
6. "Tujhe Bulayen Yeh Meri Bahen" – Lata Mangeshkar Lyrics-Ravindra Jain
7. "Yaara O Yaara" – Lata Mangeshkar, Suresh Wadkar Lyrics-Ravindra Jain
8. "Ram Teri Ganga Maili Ho Gayee" – Part 2 – Suresh Wadkar & Chorus Lyrics-Ravindra Jain, Raga Ahir Bhairav
9. "Main Hi Main Hoon -Suresh Wadkar; Lyrics – Amir Qazalbash
