= Wet and messy fetishism =

Type of sexual fetish

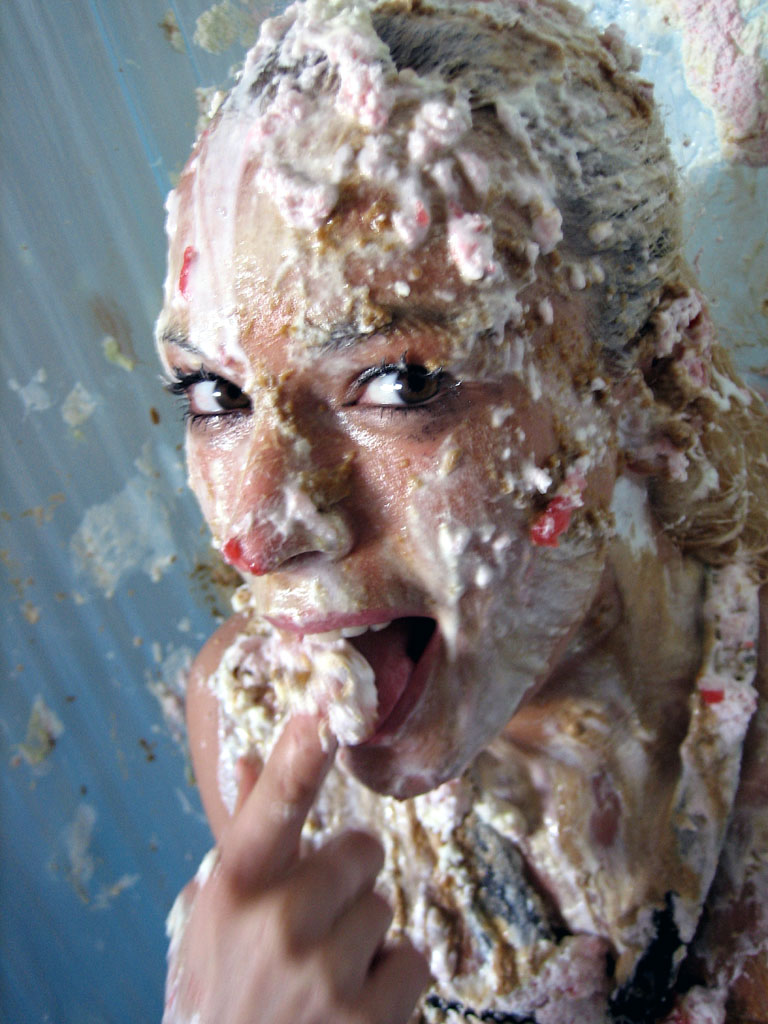
A woman who has been pied

Wet and messy fetishism (WAM), also known as sploshing, is a form of sexual fetishism involving a person getting messy with a variety of materials, such as food, mud, and water. The word "sploshing" originates from a defunct UK fetish magazine named Splosh!.

== Overview ==
Many people with WAM fetishes are drawn to the tactile sensations of wet or messy substances against their skin. Others prefer the visual appeal of others getting wet or messy with products that have different textures, consistencies, and colours. Common themes are subjects being pied or having slime dumped on them, or having substances poured inside clothing as it is being worn. Substances used in WAM play can be edible or non-edible, but do not include bodily fluids.

WAM fetish videos (made by both fans and commercial producers) may include nudity and sexual acts, while others may only feature fully clothed participants. Videos can frequently be seen on public video hosting sites like YouTube. Some of these videos are flagged, but most of them remain available despite the sexual undertones, mainly because a large majority of wet and messy videos posted publicly do not include nudity and are therefore considered suitable for all audiences to view. Indeed, not only is much WAM video content indistinguishable in any easily defined sense from the kind of slapstick featured in mainstream entertainment, but scenes of slimings or pieings from the mainstream media are often compiled and marketed by producers towards a WAM fetishist target audience.

== Crossover with other fetishes ==
There is some crossover between the wet and messy fetish and clothing destruction fetishes. Some WAM productions will see models start out fully dressed, usually in quite smart outfits such as formal dresses or suits; they will then be covered in messy substances, after which their messy clothes are cut up, typically with scissors, leaving them naked or nearly so.

WAM may be an add-on for people who already have a fetish for specific types of clothing, where getting the clothes they are already excited by messy, or wet by showering or bathing in them, adds an extra layer to the experience of wearing them.

WAM is sometimes also combined with bondage, where a subject is first restrained or chained up and then has a bucket of green cake batter slime poured over their head and/or a pie smashed in their face. Wet and Messy fetishism lends itself well to domination/submission role-playing.

"Cake sitting" (the act of deliberately sitting on a large cake, either clothed or nude) is often considered a sub-fetish in its own right, but may be linked to the crush fetish. While participants who sit on cakes for pleasure will do so for the tactile sensory experience, or as part of submissive role-playing, those who enjoy watching the act will often focus specifically on the crushing of the dessert as a visual stimulus for a sexual reaction. Cake sitting as a fully clothed WAM activity can also form just part of the overall messing up of a participant, along with other methods of application of messy substances.

== Psychology ==
No conclusive research has been conducted into the psychology behind the fetish; however, it is not uncommon for fetishists to have had an interest in the sensations of messy play since their formative years (age 3–4) with a sexual element manifesting at the onset of puberty. The "breaking taboos" theory suggests sploshing is an expression of liberation, pushing back against childhood authority figures who emphasized staying clean. In any form, the fetish is about sensual stimulation, whether visual, tactile, or otherwise.

One unproven theory is that individuals drawn to WAM have low tactile sensitivity, which is increased and intensified by wet substances acting as a lubricant under applied pressure or friction. "Messy play" is a common clinical therapy used in treating hypo-tactile patients (mostly pediatric cases) to give them an outlet and appropriate time and place to engage in mess-making.

Another aspect is the link to other fetishes, as some wet and messy play is done in a submissive or dominating way and has possible links to BDSM, the emphasis being on the humiliation of the victim, although this is often mitigated or negated by the victim taking it in good humour. The dominant partner inflicting the mess can also be an object of attraction as an assertive figure of playful mischief.

== In media ==
The popular sex column Savage Love has mentioned WAM. In one article, there was a reply to a letter from the roommate of someone who masturbates with condiments, possibly for fetishistic purposes. Dan Savage, the writer of Savage Love, did not condemn the use of condiments in that incident, but, instead, only chided the fetishist for using condiments that were later used by others.

In the "Cobbler" episode of the legal drama series, Better Call Saul, James McGill, a lawyer working on a pro bono case accompanies Daniel Wormald to an interrogation room. Wormald nervously explains to two detectives that he no longer needs their help tracking down his stolen baseball cards. When the skeptical detectives press for more details, he begins to flounder. McGill cuts him off and suggests he get a little air. Sitting alone with the detectives, he acknowledges the hiding space behind Wormald's baseboards that have made them suspicious. McGills claims it is used to store "Crybaby Squat Cobbler" fetish videos for an "art patron" who stole them and the baseball cards after a falling out. In the videos, it is explained that Wormald sits on various types of pies and cries while doing so, a fictitious fetish called "Hoboken squat cobbler". According to McGill, the art patron has returned all stolen property, and Wormald does not wish to press charges. Incredulous at the absurdity of the story, the detectives accept it. As they exit the police station, Jimmy McGill assures Wormald that he is no longer under suspicion, but that he will have to make a video of him sitting on a pie to back up Jimmy's story.

== See also ==
- Food play
- Gunge
- Lotion play
- Mud wrestling
- Mysophilia
- Saliromania
- Slapstick
- Wet T-shirt contest
- Wetlook
