= Aquaphilia (fetish) =

Form of sexual fetishism

Aquaphilia (literally "water lover" from the Latin aqua and Greek φιλειν (philein)) is a form of sexual fetishism that involves images of people swimming or posing underwater, and sexual activity in or under water.
