= 41st AVN Awards =

US adult industry award ceremony in 2024

- Presented by: MyFreeCams
- Date: January 27, 2024
- Site: Resorts World Las Vegas
- Hosted by: Lil Duval, Kazumi, Emily Lynne, and Luna Star

Highlights
- Best Film: Machine Gunner

The 41st AVN Awards was a pornography awards ceremony recognizing the best actresses, actors, directors, and films in the adult industry in 2023. The 41st edition of the ceremony, which began in 1984, encompassed over 130 categories involving content creation, production, retail and web/tech forums in the adult industry. The ceremony was held at the Resorts World Theatre at Resorts World Las Vegas on January 27, 2024, as part of the AVN Adult Entertainment Expo, and streamed on Adult Video News' AVN.com.

== Show overview ==
=== Venue ===
The awards show was hosted as part of the weekend-long AVN Adult Entertainment Expo at the Resorts World Las Vegas Theatre, the same place it was hosted at the previous year.

=== Hosts ===
In November 2023, it was announced that comedian Lil Duval would be co-hosting the show. Adult performers Luna Star, Kazumi, and Emily Lynne were announced as co-hosts for the show during the January 2024 edition of the AVN magazine.

=== Musical performances ===
Australian rapper Iggy Azalea performed during the awards show.

== Winners and nominees ==
The nominees for the 41st AVN Awards were announced on November 13, 2023.

The winners were announced during the awards ceremony on January 27, 2024.

=== Major awards ===
Winners of these categories are highlighted in boldface.

**Female Performer of the Year**: **Vanna Bardot**; Lilly Bell; Blake Blossom; Lulu Chu; Anna Claire Clouds; Nicole Doshi; Ana Foxxx; Liz Jordan; Maddy May; Kira Noir; Kylie Rocket; Alexis Tae; Angela White; Jennifer White; Angel Youngs	**Male Performer of the Year**: **Isiah Maxwell**; Mick Blue; Nathan Bronson; Manuel Ferrara; Oliver Flynn; Seth Gamble; Maximo Garcia; JMac; Ricky Johnson; Alex Jones; Scott Nails; Ramón Nomar; Tommy Pistol; Codey Steele; Zac Wild
**Best Actress**: **Kira Noir – Machine Gunner, Digital Playground/Pulse**; Lilly Bell – Trouble, Dorcel/Pulse; Lulu Chu – Feed Me, Adult Time/Pulse; Avery Cristy – The View, Deeper/Pulse; Stormy Daniels – Redemption, Adam & Eve Pictures; Ana Foxxx – Sally Mae: The Revenge of the Twin Dragons, Adult Time/Pulse; Nicole Kitt – Ashford Manor, Lust Cinema; Kira Noir – Machine Gunner, Digital Playground/Pulse; April Olsen – Hang in There, Abigail, Delphine Films; Freya Parker – The Seductress 4, Sweet Sinner/Mile High; Ivy Wolfe – Reckless, Wicked/Pulse	**Best Actor**: **Tommy Pistol – Feed Me, Adult Time/Pulse**; Barrett Blade – Redemption, Adam & Eve Pictures; Dante Colle – The Wedding, Lust Cinema; Xander Corvus – Space Junk, Digital Playground/Pulse; Lucky Fate – Privilege, Wicked/Pulse; Seth Gamble – Reckless, Wicked/Pulse; Jonte – Ashford Manor, Lust Cinema; Isiah Maxwell – Sally Mae: The Revenge of the Twin Dragons, Adult Time/Pulse; Ryan Mclane – Platonic, Sweet Sinner/Mile High; Derrick Pierce – Primary 3, Lust Cinema
**Best Actress - Featurette**: **Maitland Ward – Casting Couch: My DP 6, Tushy/Pulse**; Scarlett Alexis – Piano Play, Family Strokes/Team Skeet; Anna Claire Clouds – Knots: If It Feels Good 4, Deeper/Pulse; Reagan Foxx – Returned: Enjoy Your Stay, Pure Taboo/Adult Time/Pulse; Brooklyn Gray – We Are Alone Now, Delphine Films; Lumi Ray – Hopeless, Holly Randall Productions; Octavia Red – You Deserve Me, MissaX; Vanessa Vega – No Going Back, Pure Taboo/Adult Time; Dee Williams – We Musn't Upset Him, Pure Taboo/Adult Time; Maya Woulfe – Maya Woulfe, Delphine Films	**Best Actor - Featurette**: **Tommy Pistol – We Are Alone Now, Delphine Films**; Robby Apples – What Are You Doing Bro, AOFlix; Nathan Bronson – No Going Back, Pure Taboo/Adult Time; Danny D – The Chosen Nymph: Darkwoods, Digital Playground/Pulse; Ryan Driller – You Deserve Me, MissaX; Oliver Flynn – Knots: If It Feels Good 4, Deeper/Pulse; Seth Gamble – The Mystery of Jane Doe, Delphine Films; Codey Steele – Polar Opposites: Out of Our System, Pure Taboo/Adult Time/Pulse; Jonte – Mating Rituals, ForPlay Films; Chad White – Risqué Business, MissaX
**Movie of the Year**: **Machine Gunner, Digital Playground/Pulse**; Ashford Manor, Lust Cinema; Feed Me, Adult Time/Pulse; Love, Sex & Robots, Adam & Eve Pictures; Primary 3, Lust Cinema; Reckless, Wicked/Pulse; Redemption, Adam & Eve Pictures; Sally Mae: The Revenge of the Twin Dragons, Adult Time/Pulse; The View, Deeper/Pulse; Wasteland Ultra, Digital Playground/Pulse	**Best Featurette**: **The Mystery of Jane Doe, Delphine Films**; Barbie in the Porn World, SugarBabes.tv; The Chosen Nymph: Darkwoods, Digital Playground/Pulse; Doppelgänger, Sensex Studios; Hopeless, Holly Randall Productions; Knots: If It Feels Good 4, Deeper/Pulse; Polar Opposites: Out of Our System, Pure Taboo/Adult Time/Pulse; Raining Blood, Somegore; Risqué Business, MissaX; Tell Me (Director's Cut), 2049 Entertainment/Afterglow
**Best Supporting Actress**: **Victoria Voxxx – Primary 3, Lust Cinema**; Aiden Ashely – Redemption, Adam & Eve Pictures; Cali Caliente – Sally Mae: The Revenge of the Twin Dragons, Adult Time/Pulse; Charlie Forde – Behind the Scenes, Delphine Films; Laney Grey – Redemption, Adam & Eve Pictures; Andi James – The Wedding, Lust Cinema; Geisha Kyd – Space Junk, Digital Playground/Pulse; Ryan Reid – Reckless, Wicked/Pulse; August Skye – Reckless, Wicked/Pulse; Jane Wilde – Trouble, Dorce/Pulse	**Best Supporting Actor**: **Danny D – Space Junk, Digital Playground/Pulse**; Robby Apples – Hang in There, Abigail, Delphine Films; Nathan Bronson – Privilege, Digital Playground/Pulse; Dillon Diaz – Ashford Manor, Lust Cinema; Damon Dice – Hang in There, Abigail, Delphine Films; Alex Jones – Machine Gunner, Digital Playground/Pulse; Nade Nasty – The Seductress 4, Sweet Sinner/Mile High; Will Pounder – Redemption, Adam & Even Pictures; Codey Steele – Primary 3, Lust Cinema; Lexington Steele – Reckless, Wicked/Pulse
**Female Foreign Performer of the Year**: **Cherry Kiss**; Little Caprice; Kelly Collins; Alexis Crystal; Anna de Ville; Shalina Devine; Eden Ivy; Scarlett Jones; Catherine Knight; Geisha Kyd; Veronica Leal; Clara Mia; Tiffany Tatum; Christy White; Zaawaadu	**Male Foreign Performer of the Year**: **Vince Karter**; Alberto Blanco; Marcello Bravo; Kristof Cale; Christian Clay; Raul Costa; Danny D; Potro de Bilbao; Charlie Dean; Erik Everhard; Tommy Gold; Freddy Gong; David Perry; Jordi El Niño Polla; Aaron Rock
**Best New Starlet**: **Chanel Camryn**; Scarlett Alexis; Katrina Colt; Demi Hawks; Molly Little; Mina Luxx; Emma Magnolia; Hailey Rose; Jennie Rose; Willow Ryder; Queenie Sateen; Lily Starfire; Melissa Stratton; Chloe Surreal; Summer Vixen	**Transgender Performer of the Year**: **Emma Rose**; Valeria Atreides; Zariah Aura; Asia Belle; Erica Cherry; Ariel Demure; Tori Easton; Gracie Jane; Brittney Kade; Kasey Kei; Eva Maxim; Lola Morena; Daisy Taylor; Jade Venus; Izzy Wilde
**Director of the Year**: **Influence: Vanna Bardot, Tushy – Derek Dozer**; Ashford Manor, Lust Cinema – Inka Winter; In Vogue, Vixen/Pulse – Julia Grandi; Machine Gunner, Digital Playground/Pulse – Ricky Greenwood; Primary 3, Lust Cinema – Casey Calvert; Reckless, Wicked/Pulse – Seth Gamble; Redemption, Adam & Eve Pictures – Stormy Daniels; Space Junk, Digital Playground/Pulse – Dick Bush; Wasteland Ultra, Digital Playground/Pulse – Lea Lexis; The Wedding, Lust Cinema – Erika Lust	**Best Editing**: **Influence: Vanna Bardot, Tushy – Gabrielle Anex**; Machine Gunner, Digital Playground/Pulse – Papa Bitch, Boris Dongson & Steve McQueef; Missing, Dorcel/Pulse – Hervé Bodilis; Primary 3, Lust Cinema – Bryn Pryor; Reckless, Wicked/Pulse – Claudia Ross; Redemption, Adam & Eve Pictures – Barrett Blade; Sally Mae: The Revenge of the Twin Dragons, Adult Time/Pulse – Clit Eastwood; Space Junk, Digital Playground/Pulse – Papa Bitch & Boris Dongson; The View, Deeper/Pulse – Duboko; Wasteland Ultra, Digital Playground/Pulse – Steve McQueef & Jep Lamela
**Best Cinematography**: **Ashford Manor, Lust Cinema – Viki Collins**; "Hopeless", Holly Randall Productions – Jeffrey John Hart; Luna Star: Seduce & Destroy, Brazzers – Zeus; Machine Gunner, Digital Playground/Pulse – Matt Holder; Primary 3, Lust Cinema – Bryn Pryor; Privilege, Wicked/Pulse – James Avalon; Reckless, Wicked/Pulse – Billy Visual, Sammy Slater, David Lord, James Avalon & Axel Braun; Redemption, Adam & Eve Pictures – Barrett Blade; The View, Deeper/Pulse – Set Walker; The Wedding, Lust Cinema – Thais Català	**Best Soundtrack**: **Influence: Vanna Bardot, Tushy**; Deep Inside Jennifer White, Darkko/Evil Angel; Feed Me, Adult Time/Pulse; "Going Up", Sensex Studios; "Hopeless", Holly Randall Productions; Machine Gunner, Digital Playground/Pulse; Primary 3, Lust Cinema; Redemption, Adam & Even Pictures; Sally Mae: The Revenge of the Twin Dragons, Adult Time/Pulse; The Wedding, Lust Cinema

=== Additional award winners ===
**VIDEO**

- Best All-Girl Group Sex Scene: Lesbian Threesomes Scene 3, Sweetheart/Mile High – Blake Blossom, Vanessa Sky, Aidra Fox
- Best All-Girl Movie or Limited Series: Drip 3, Slayed/Pulse
- Best All-Girl Series or Channel: Touch, Slayed/Pulse
- Best Anal Movie or Limited Series: Anal Icons 2, Tushy/Pulse
- Best Anal Series or Channel: Tushy Raw, Tushy Raw/Pulse
- Best Anal Sex Scene: Influence: Vanna Bardot – Part 1, Tushy – Vanna Bardot & Maximo Garcia
- Best Anthology Movie or Limited Series: Video Secrets, Deeper/Pulse
- Best Anthology Series or Channel: Club VXN, Vixen/Pulse
- Best Art Direction: Space Junk, Digital Playground/Pulse
- Best BDSM Movie or Limited Series: Switch: Leaving Your Mark, Adult Time/Pulse
- Best Blowbang Scene: Mouths of Babes Part 1: Up to and Including Her Limits 3, Deeper/Pulse – Vicki Chase
- Best Boy/Girl Sex Scene: She Ruined Me, Deeper – Violet Myers & Chris Diamond
- Best Curve Appeal Movie or Limited Series: Breast Worship 8, Jules Jordan Video
- Best Directing Portfolio – International: Julia Grandi
- Best Directing Portfolio – Cross-Genre: Ricky Greenwood
- Best Directing Portfolio – Narrative: Kayden Kross
- Best Directing Portfolio – Non-Narrative: Jules Jordan
- Best Directing Portfolio – Specialty: Aiden Starr
- Best Double-Penetration Sex Scene: Influence: Vanna Bardot Part 3, Tushy – Vanna Bardot, Alex Jones & Dante Colle
- Best Female Mixed-Age Movie or Limited Series: Moms Bang Teens 47, Reality Kings/Pulse
- Best Foursome/Orgy Scene: All For Us: Blacked Raw V70, Blacked Raw/Pulse – Gianna Dior, Kylie Rocket, Richard Mann & Dwayne Fox
- Best Gangbang Scene: Angela White: Unbound Part 4, Brazzers – Angela White, Alex Mack, John Strong, Eddie Jaye, Vince Karter, Will Pounder, Scotty P & Mazee the Goat
- Best Girl/Girl Sex Scene: Punch, Slayed – Vanna Bardot & Liz Jordan
- Best Gonzo/Cinemacore Movie or Limited Series: Performers of the Year 2023, Elegang Angel
- Best Gonzo/Cinemacore Series or Channel: Blacked Raw, Blacked Raw/Pulse
- Best Hair & Makeup: Sally Mae: The Revenge of the Twin Dragons, Adult Time/Pulse – Raven Lux
- Best Ingénue Movie or Limited Series: Slut Puppies 16, Jules Jordan Video
- Best Ingénue Series or Channel: Young Fantasies, Vixen/Pulse
- Best International All-Girl Sex Scene: Dollhouse 2, Slayed – Little Caprice & Eva Elfie
- Best International Anal Sex Scene: In Vogue Part 2, Vixen/Pulse – Vanessa Alessia & Vince Karter
- Best International Group Sex Scene: Newly Engaged Swingers, WeCumToYou/Little Caprice Dreams – Little Caprice, Rika Fane, Stanley Johnson, Marcello Bravo
- Best International Production: Missing, Dorcel/Pulse
- Best Male Newcomer: Hollywood Cash
- Best MILF Movie or Limited Series: MILF Performers of the Year 2023, Elegant Angel
- Best MILF/Female Mixed-Age Series or Channel: Mother-Daughter Exchange Club, Girlfriends Films
- Best Multi-Partner Movie or Limited Series: Three V3, Deeper/Pulse
- Best New International Starlet: Rika Fane
- Best New Production Brand: MILFY
- Best Niche Movie or Limited Series: When the Husband Likes to Watch, New Sensations
- Best Niche Series or Channel: How Women Orgasm, Adult Time
- Best Non-Sex Performance: Julia Ann, Privilege, Wicked/Pulse
- Best Oral Movie or Limited Series: Wet Food 10, Darkko/Evil Angel
- Best Oral Sex Scene: Machine Gunner: Episode 3, Digital Playground/Pulse – Kira Noir & Tommy Pistol
- Best POV Sex Scene: Big Tit Teen Angel Youngs Creampie, MrLuckyPOV – Angel Youngs & Mr. Lucky
- Best Screenplay – Featurette: Polar Opposites: Out of Our System, Pure Taboo/Adult Time/Pulse – Bree Mills & Seth Gamble
- Best Screenplay – Movie or Limited Series: Primary 3, Lust Cinema – Casey Calvert & Mark Logan
- Best Solo/Tease Performance: Drawn to You: Vanity, Wicked/Pulse – Blake Blossom

**(Continued)**

- Best Star Showcase: Vicki Chase Ninfomana, Darkko/Evil Angel
- Best Taboo Relations Movie or Limited Series: My Sexy Little Sister 15, Digital Sin
- Best Tag-Team Sex Scene: Machine Gunner: Episode 2, Digital Playground/Pulse – Kira Noir, Charles Dera & Scott Nails
- Best Best Thespian – Trans/X: Daisy Taylor, Daisy's Flower Box, TransAngels
- Best Three-way Sex Scene: All In: Three V3, Deeper/Pulse – Jane Wilde, Avery Black & Troy Francisco
- Best Trans Group Sex Scene: Horny Golden Goddesses: Tantalizing Threesomes 2, TransAngels/Pulse – Izzy Wilde, Lola Morena & Billie Beaumont
- Best Trans Movie or Limited Series: office Ms. Conduct, Transfixed/Adult Time/Pulse
- Best Trans Newcomer: Leilani Li
- Best Trans One-on-One Sex Scene: Muses: Kasey Kei, Transfixed/Adult Time – Kasey Kei & Casey Calvert
- Best Trans Series or Channel: Transfixed, Adult Time/Pulse
- Best VR Group Sex Scene: Mile High Clug, SLR Originals/SexLikeReal – Blake Blossom, Angel Youngs, Tru Kait & John Strong
- Best VR One-on-One Sex Scene: Dante's Inferno: Beatrice A XXX Parody, VRCosplayX.com – Blake Blossom & Ryan Driller
- Best VR Trans Sex Scene: Measure Me, VRB Trans – Emma Rose & Dante Colle
- Clever Title of the Year: Total Eclipse of the Hole, Proxy Paige/Evil Angel
- Girl/Girl Specialty Performer of the Year: Amirah Adara
- Mainstream Venture of the Year: Everything in Its Right Place (Short Film) – Vicki Chase
- Mark Stone Award for Outstanding Comedy: Influence: Vanna Bardot, Tushy
- MILF Performer of the Year: Penny Barber
- Most Outrageous Sex Scene: Raining Blood (or Night of the Jizzed-In Dead), Somegore – Ana Foxxx & Tommy Pistol
- Niche Specialty Performer of the Year: Dante Colle

**FAN-VOTED**

- Favorite Adult Podcast: Pillow Talk
- Favorite BBW Star: Alex Blair
- Favorite Camming Couple: Kayley and Emily
- Favorite Cosplayer: (tie) Sweetie Fox & Bunni Black
- Favorite Domme: London River
- Favorite Female Porn Star: Violet Myers
- Favorite Female Indie Creator: Coco Bae
- Favorite Male Indie Creator: John Legendary
- Favorite Male Porn Star: Dredd
- Favorite Porn Star Creator: Angela White
- Favorite Trans Porn Star: Daisy Taylor
- Favorite Trans Cam Star/Creator: Aubrey Kate
- Favorte Cam Girl: OnlineGirl_ (Alex Knight)
- Hottest Anal Creator Collab: Angela White & Alex Mack
- Hottest Adult Newcomer: Emma Magnolia
- Hottest Boy/Girl Creator Collab: Lena the Plug & Jason Luv
- Hottest All-Girl Creator Collab: Angela White & Violet Myers
- Hottest Trans Creator Collab: Aubrey Kate & Dante Colle
- Most Amazing Ass: Abella Danger
- Most Spectacular Boobs: Angela White
- Sexiest MILF: Kendra Lust
- Ultimate Oral Content Creator: Coco Bae
- Unsung Darling: Kali Roses

**PLEASURE PRODUCTS**

- Best Enhancement Manufacturer: Sensuva
- Best Lingeri or Apparel Line: Barely Bare
- Best Lubricant Brand: Swiss Navy
- Best Pleasure Product Manufacturer – Large: XR Brands
- Best Pleasure Product Manufacturer – Medium: Motorbunny
- Best Pleasure Product Manufacturer – Small: OEJ Novelty

**RETAIL**

- Best Boutique: Museum of Sex, New York City
- Best Retail Chain – Large: Lion's Den
- Best Retail Chain – Medium: Romeo & Juliet's
- Best Retail Chain – Small: Cupid's Closet
- Best Web Retail Store: PinkCherry.com
