= AAO =

AAO, AAo or aao may refer to:

== Organizations ==
- Administrative Appeals Office, an office within US Citizenship and Immigration Services
- American Academy of Ophthalmology
- American Academy of Optometry
- American Academy of Osteopathy
- American Association of Orthodontists

== Places ==
- Andrushivka Astronomical Observatory, an observatory in Ukraine
- Australian Astronomical Observatory, an observatory in Australia
- Colonel James Jabara Airport (FAA LID: AAO), Wichita, Kansas, US
- Anaco Airport in Anzoátegui, Venezuela (IATA airport code AAO)

== Science and Technology ==
- Acer Aspire One, a subcompact notebook computer
- Alert, awake, and oriented, a measure of level of consciousness
- Amino acid oxidase, any of several enzymes:
  - D-amino acid oxidase, which catalyzes D-amino acids, producing imino acids, ammonia, and hydrogen peroxide
  - L-amino-acid oxidase, which catalyzes L-amino acids, producing keto acids, ammonia, and hydrogen peroxide
- Anodic Aluminum Oxide
- Antarctic oscillation, a low-frequency mode of atmospheric variability of the southern hemisphere
- Ascending aorta (usually as "AAo")

== Other uses ==
- "AAO" (song), a 2015 single by Kis-My-Ft2
- Saharan Arabic language (ISO-639-3 code "aao")
- a.a.O., am angegebenen Ort, or Loc. cit. in German publications
- Aktionsanalytische Organisation, former Austrian/German commune
- America's Army, a computer game series
