= VRSpy =

- Type: Private
- Industry: Adult entertainment, Virtual reality
- Founded: 2023
- Headquarters: Los Angeles, California, United States
- Area served: Worldwide
- Products: VR/AR adult video content; streaming platform
- Website: vrspy.com

VRSpy is an American VR adult entertainment studio and streaming platform, founded in 2023 and headquartered in Los Angeles, California. The company operates as both a production studio for VR and AR adult video content and as a consumer streaming service through its platform VRSpy.com.

== History ==
VRSpy was established in 2023 in Los Angeles, California. In its founding year, the company began distributing content through established industry platforms, including SexLikeReal, PornDude, and DreamCam, and entered a collaboration with VR director Alex Nash. In 2024, VRSpy expanded its distribution network through a partnership with Ohdoki.

Starting in 2023, VRSpy has received nominations at the AVN Awards and the XBIZ Awards in each subsequent year. The company has been nominated annually across three AVN categories - Best New Production Brand, Best VR Group Sex Scene, and Best VR One-on-One Sex Scene - and two XBIZ/XMAs categories - Best Sex Scene (Virtual Reality) and Virtual Reality Site of the Year.

The 40th AVN Awards were held on January 7, 2023, at Resorts World Las Vegas Theatre, encompassing over 120 categories. The 42nd AVN Awards took place on January 25, 2025, at the Theater at Virgin Hotels Las Vegas. The 43rd AVN Awards were held on January 24, 2026, at the same venue. The 2026 XMAs nominees were announced on January 8, 2026, at the Hollywood Palladium, during XBIZ Week.

== Nominations record ==
Year	Ceremony	Date	Category	Result
2023	40th AVN Awards	January 7, 2023	Best New Production Brand	Nominee
2023	40th AVN Awards	January 7, 2023	Best VR Group Sex Scene	Nominee
2023	40th AVN Awards	January 7, 2023	Best VR One-on-One Sex Scene	Nominee
2023	XBIZ Awards	January 15, 2023	Best Sex Scene – Virtual Reality	Nominee
2023	XBIZ Awards	January 15, 2023	Virtual Reality Site of the Year	Nominee
2024	41st AVN Awards	January 24, 2024	Best New Production Brand	Nominee
2024	41st AVN Awards	January 24, 2024	Best VR Group Sex Scene	Nominee
2024	41st AVN Awards	January 24, 2024	Best VR One-on-One Sex Scene	Nominee
2024	XBIZ Awards	January 15, 2024	Best Sex Scene – Virtual Reality	Nominee
2024	XBIZ Awards	January 15, 2024	Virtual Reality Site of the Year	Nominee
2025	42nd AVN Awards	January 22, 2025	Best New Production Brand	Nominee
2025	42nd AVN Awards	January 22, 2025	Best VR Group Sex Scene	Nominee
2025	42nd AVN Awards	January 22, 2025	Best VR One-on-One Sex Scene	Nominee
2025	XMAs	January 19, 2025	Best Sex Scene – Virtual Reality	Nominee
2025	XMAs	January 19, 2025	Virtual Reality Site of the Year	Nominee
2026	43rd AVN Awards	January 21, 2026	Best New Production Brand	Nominee
2026	43rd AVN Awards	January 21, 2026	Best VR Group Sex Scene	Nominee
2026	43rd AVN Awards	January 21, 2026	Best VR One-on-One Sex Scene	Nominee
2026	XMAs	January 8, 2026	Best Sex Scene – Virtual Reality	Nominee
2026	XMAs	January 8, 2026	Virtual Reality Site of the Year	Nominee

== Operations ==
VRSpy operates as both a production studio and a consumer streaming platform, creating VR and AR video content including standalone scenes and narrative format projects, and distributing it through its own site, VRSpy.com, as well as third-party platforms. The streaming service offers one-time purchases, subscriptions, and free content, and supports features such as passthrough/mixed reality viewing, interactive scenarios with optional haptic device integration, and compatibility with multiple VR players and headsets.

== See also ==
- Virtual reality pornography
- SexLikeReal
- AVN Awards
- XBIZ Awards
