= Seedfeeder =

Contributor of sex act illustrations to Wikipedia

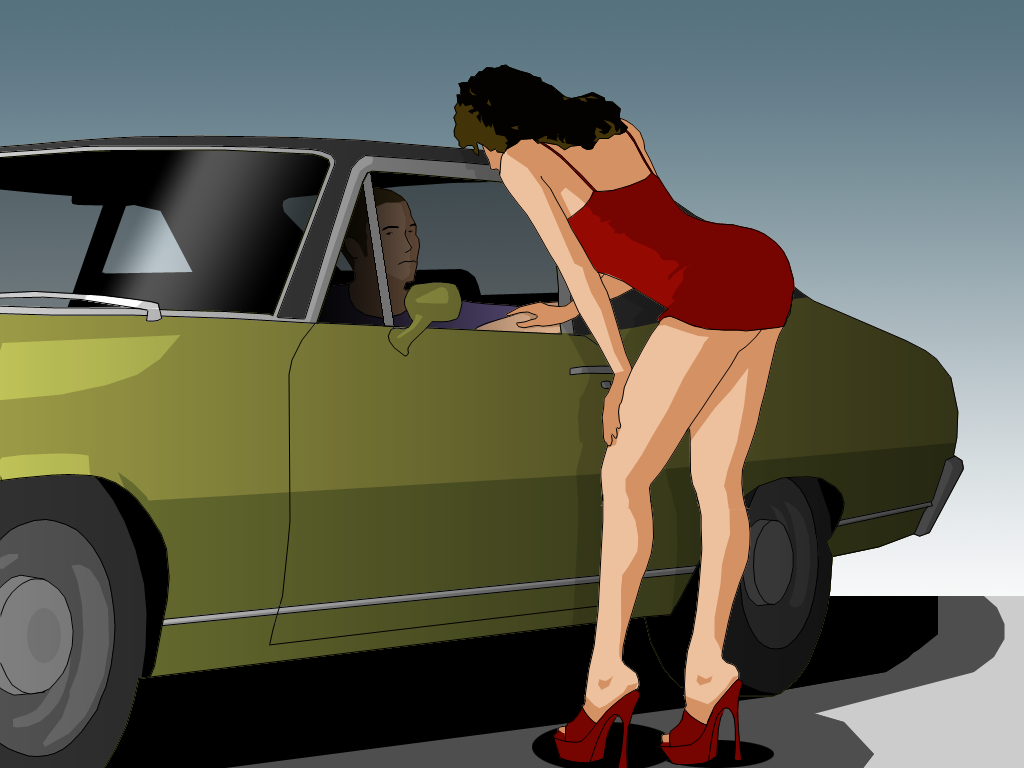
Seedfeeder's illustration of a prostitute soliciting a potential client in a stopped vehicle

Seedfeeder (fl. 7 July 2008 – 22 June 2012) is a pseudonymous illustrator known for contributing sexually explicit drawings to Wikipedia. Between 2008 and 2012, the artist created 48 depictions of various sexual acts. Seedfeeder's illustrations garnered mixed reactions: some Wikipedia editors claimed they contained racist and sexist undertones, while Andy Cush of Gawker called him "Wikipedia's greatest artist of sex acts". Artnet columnist Paddy Johnson listed Seedfeeder's work as one of the "Top 10 Digital Artworks of 2014".

== Work ==
Seedfeeder contributed 48 drawings of 35 various sex positions; these have also been used in other language editions of Wikipedia. They are available for adaptation and reuse under the conditions of a Creative Commons license. The images are vector graphics with gradient colors and neutral backgrounds; Seedfeeder said that he lacked the skills to make complex backgrounds. The simplified and "sterile" style of the artwork has been compared to that of aircraft safety cards.

They contributed drawings to the following Wikipedia articles, among others:

English Wikipedia articles using Seedfeeder's illustrations (as of 16 August 2025) (Note: Although the first sentence of this section says that "Seedfeeder contributed 48 drawings of 35 various sex positions", the table only lists 38 unique drawings in 27 unique articles. The discrepancy may be due to some drawings not being used in Wikipedia articles, and some articles combining multiple sex positions into a single article.)
Wikipedia article (Note: Italicized titles are used to indicate entries that are transliteration of foreign language words and/or redirects to other articles)	Number of illustrations used in article	Date illustrations originally uploaded to Wikipedia	Notes
69 (sex position)	1	28 March 2010	
Anal sex	3	25 August 2008, 8 November 2008, 22 November 2010	
Anilingus	1	4 December 2011	
Bukkake	2	11 August 2008, 18 August 2009	The first illustration was removed from the article in the English Wikipedia, but is still used in the equivalent articles in many other languages such as Czech, Dutch, Finnish, Persian, Polish, and Swedish.
Cum shot	1	31 December 2008	
Cunnilingus	1	27 December 2009	
Doggy style	1	21 January 2010	
Double penetration	1	29 January 2012	
Ekiben (sexual act)	1	17 August 2011	
Facial (sex act)	3	7 July 2008, 20 January 2009	Seedfeeder revised the first illustration on 26 December 2011 and the second illustration on 29 December 2011. The date for the third illustration in the article is provided in the entry for Cum shot.
Fellatio / Deep-throating	2	17 August 2008, 12 January 2012	Seedfeeder revised the first illustration on 19 December 2011.
Fingering (sexual act)	1	15 January 2009	
Fisting	1	20 September 2009	
Gokkun / Snowballing (sexual practice)	2	1 September 2008, 28 August 2008	Seedfeeder revised the first illustration on 31 December 2011
Lateral coital position	1	23 August 2009	
Mammary intercourse	1	4 January 2009	
Missionary position	4	20 November 2010, 2 June 2011, 27 February 2012, 26 May 2012	
Oral sex	1	2 January 2009	
Non-penetrative sex	2	13 March 2012	The date for the second illustration in the article is provided in the entry for Mammary intercourse
Point-of-view pornography	1	23 June 2011	
Sex position	10 (Note: excludes an image that is a collage of 9 illustrations, 8 of which are Seedfeeder's work)	19 February 2012	The date is for the only illustration in the article that is unique to this article. All other illustrations are also located in other articles.
Sexual practices between women	4	11 October 2009	The date is for the only illustration in the article that is unique to this article. All other illustrations are also located in other articles.
Spooning	1	13 September 2009	
Teabagging	1	12 April 2010	
Threesome	2	15 October 2008, 7 March 2012	
Tribadism	2	20 December 2009	The date for the second illustration in the article is provided in the entry for Missionary Position
Woman on top	2	19 September 2010, 29 August 2011	

Seedfeeder retired from Wikipedia in June 2012.

== Reception ==
=== General reactions ===
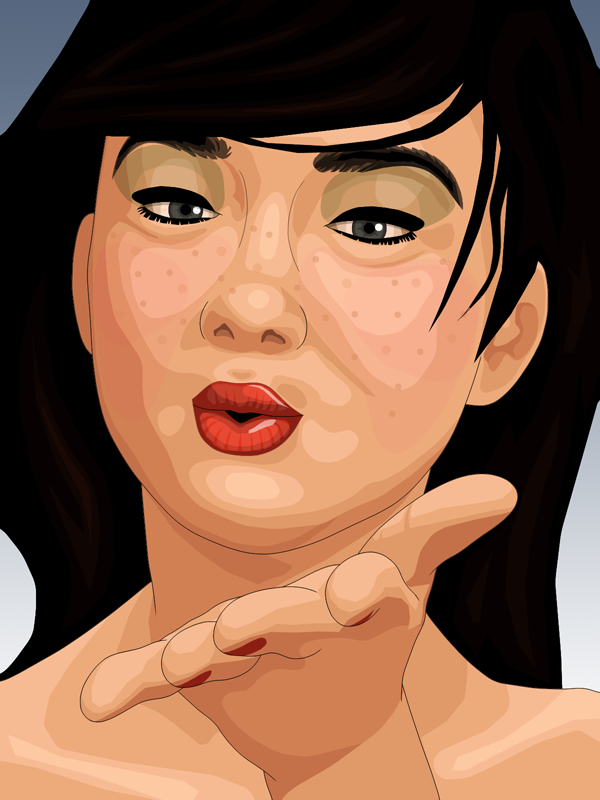
Seedfeeder created this illustration of "a freckled Asian woman blowing a seductive goodbye kiss" for his retirement announcement. Seedfeeder captioned the illustration with the sentence "So long, and thanks for all the fish", which has been interpreted as a "nerdy cunnilingus joke".

Seedfeeder's images received media coverage in numerous languages and publications. In 2014, Gawker's Andy Cush published an article about Seedfeeder's "frank, graphic" illustrations, and a companion gallery called "The Best of Seedfeeder, Wikipedia's Greatest Sex Illustrator", which he described as a collection of the artist's "greatest works". In his Gawker piece, Cush called Seedfeeder "Wikipedia's greatest artist of sex acts" and his work "unmistakable" and "nearly as striking as [the] subject matter". Cyriaque Lamar of Cracked.com called the images "goddamn hilarious" and also compared them to airline safety pamphlets. Lamar acknowledged their educational value but criticized them for being too pornographic for pedagogical purposes. The Cracked.com article included a gallery of the six "most terrifying sex illustrations on Wikipedia".

HuffPost's Andres Jauregui said the illustrations were "anything but shy" and that "by rendering intense acts of coupling in a sterile, almost instructional manner, Seedfeeder's drawings have a normalizing effect on bedroom play that some might consider taboo". He wrote that the sexual acts Seedfeeder illustrates "aren't weird, but the plastic, detached style in which they're rendered is bizarrely matter-of-fact, like the airline safety pamphlets that the illustrator says inspired them". Furthermore, he said: "Some wouldn't consider it art, but it's not porn, either. The drawings are educational, but they serve a purpose beyond illustration." Artnet columnist Paddy Johnson listed Seedfeeder's work as one of the "Top 10 Digital Artworks of 2014".

=== Criticism ===
Seedfeeder's drawings were also met with controversy. Some Wikipedia contributors perceived racist and sexist undertones, resulting in the removal of some images from English-language Wikimedia projects. A depiction of a facial featuring a black man ejaculating onto a white woman prompted criticism, with some users claiming that the image was racist and promoted violence against women.

Seedfeeder responded to those who argued that descriptions of sex acts without accompanying images would be best by saying: "I come from a philosophical viewpoint that every Wikipedia article should have all forms of media available associated with it. Images, audio, and video. All articles, without exception. So any argument predicated on 'an image isn't necessary' is one that carries absolutely zero weight. None." In an interview with NaTemat.pl, sexologist Andrzej Depko defended the images, saying that images of sexual activity are nothing new and that people should not be offended by sex.

In response to criticism of the interracial facial image, Seedfeeder implied the backlash was due to racial prejudice, stating, "What about the heroes being from two different races? I don't care about the prejudices and anxieties of people with limited horizons." Seedfeeder also responded to criticism that children could discover his illustrations by writing, "if your children are actively searching for these kind of topics... it's because they already have a slight idea of them... and they feel ready to know more."

== See also ==
- List of Wikipedia people
