= Free sex =

Free sex may refer to:

- Promiscuity, undiscriminating casual sex with many sexual partners
- Group sex
- Human sexual activity that does not cost money (as opposed to sex that is paid for)

== See also ==
- Free love
