= Mammary intercourse =

Non-penetrative sex act

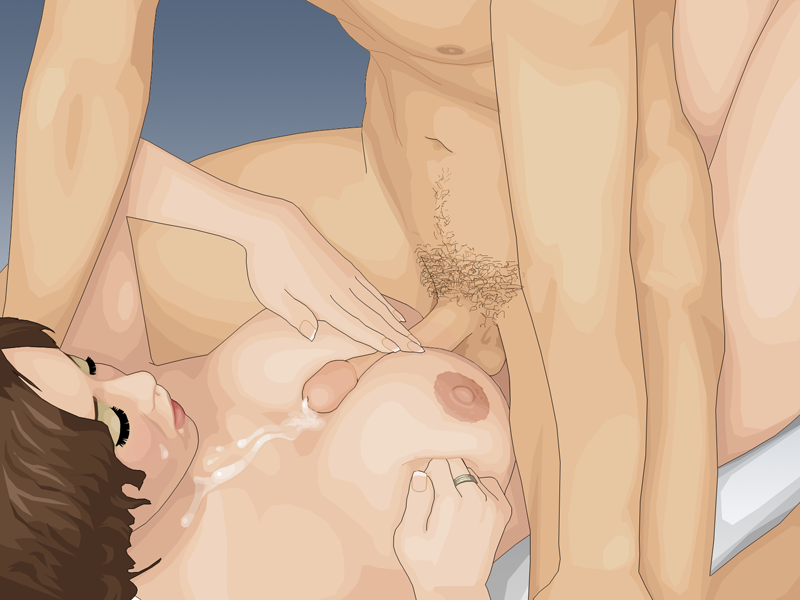
An illustration by Seedfeeder of the woman in a lying position with the man ejaculating

Mammary intercourse is a sex act, performed as either foreplay or as non-penetrative sex, that involves the stimulation of a man's penis by a woman's breasts and vice versa. It involves placing the penis between a woman's breasts and moving the penis up and down to simulate sexual penetration and to create sexual pleasure.

== Practice ==
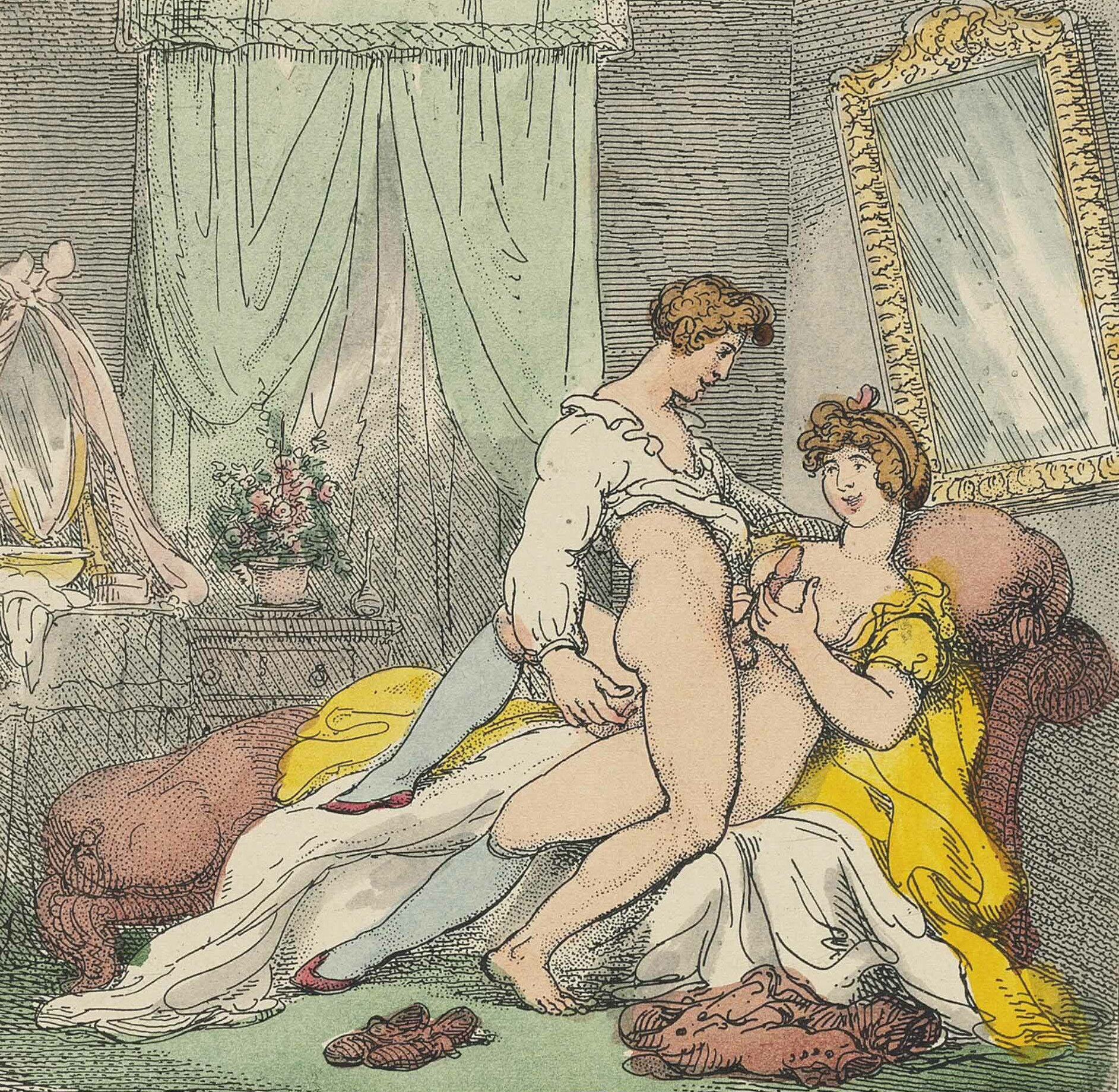
Painting of mammary intercourse c. 1800

Mammary intercourse involves a man kneeling or sitting on a woman's stomach or chest, placing his erect penis on her cleavage, and rubbing or thrusting while the breasts are squeezed around the penile shaft, by either the woman or the man, creating tightness similar to masturbation, and in simulation of penetrative sex. A lubricant or saliva may be used between the breasts or on the penis. Alternatively, the woman can tighten her breasts around the penis and move them back and forth. Other positions involve either the man standing while the woman kneels, or the man laying back with the woman on top.

In some cases, mammary intercourse can be combined with oral sex. Mammary intercourse may be carried out face to face or head to tail.

While mammary intercourse is mostly suited for women with naturally larger breasts, the book The Joy of Sex recommended that women with smaller breasts be on top. Smaller female breasts tend to be more sensitive than larger ones.

The woman normally does not receive direct sexual stimulation during mammary intercourse, other than the erotic stimulation of bringing her partner to orgasm, without sexual penetration. However, Alex Comfort has said that mammary intercourse can produce orgasm in women with sensitive breasts (what Margot Anand terms local orgasms of the breast), and it was one of the nine substitute exercises for penetrative sexual activities, as detailed in the Paradis Charnels of 1903. It is possible for the man to perform a fingering on the woman during mammary intercourse.

Since mammary intercourse is a non-penetrative sex act, the risk of passing a sexually transmitted infection (STI) that requires direct contact between the mucous membranes and pre-ejaculate or semen is greatly reduced. HIV is among the infections that require such direct contact and is therefore very unlikely to be transmitted via mammary intercourse. A study of the condom usage habits of New Zealand's sex workers said that they offered various safe sex alternatives to vaginal sex to clients who refused to wear a condom. One sex worker said that mammary intercourse was one alternative used; mammary intercourse performed by a woman with large breasts felt to the client like penetrative vaginal sex.

Popular depictions of mammary intercourse, at least in advertising, have been described as erotic, and is a common practice in pornography. Mammary intercourse has sometimes been considered a perversion. Sigmund Freud, however, considered such extensions of sexual interest to fall within the range of the normal, unless marked out by exclusivity (i.e. the repudiation of all other forms of sexual contact).

== Slang terms ==
Slang terms for mammary intercourse include:

- Titty-fuck, titjob or titfuck in the United States
- Tit wank or French fuck in the United Kingdom — the latter term dating back to the 1930s; while a more jocular equivalent is a trip down mammary lane.

== See also ==
- Breast fetishism
- Kama Sutra
- Non-penetrative sex
- Pearl necklace (sexual act)
