= Inka Winter =

German-American filmmaker, sex educator

- Education: Technische Universität Berlin; HTW Berlin
- Occupations: Filmmaker; Screenwriter; Sex educator; Trauma-informed relationship counselor

Inka Winter is a German-American erotic filmmaker, sex educator, and trauma-informed relationship counselor. She is best known as the founder of ForPlay Films, an independent feminist pornography studio emphasizing ethical production, the female gaze, and consensual erotic narratives.

== Early life and education ==
Winter spent her early years in the Friedrichshof Commune, a controversial socialist commune near Vienna founded by artist Otto Muehl, known for enforced communal child-rearing practices. She later attended Schulfarm Insel Scharfenberg, a progressive boarding school located on an island in Berlin's Tegeler See.

She studied economics at the Technische Universität Berlin and fashion design at the University of Applied Sciences Berlin (HTW Berlin). She is also a certified sex educator and counselor through the American Board of Sexology.

== Career ==
Winter founded ForPlay Films to produce erotic short films that spotlight the female gaze, authentic consent, and emotional intimacy. The studio has been described in the industry as “Made by women, for women.”

Winter is also collaborating with a range of other labels, e.g. Marc Dorcel and Erika Lust.

Her films and educational projects focus on themes such as pleasure, communication, and sexual autonomy. On her official site she describes herself as “a certified sex and relationship counselor ... [and] an award-winning, independent, feminist porn producer ... who focuses on genuine pleasure, authentic connection, and empowering each of my performers to claim and express their own true desires.”

In 2024, Vice profiled her work and quoted an actress who said: “The first time I arrived on Inka’s set, I was asked, ‘What do you want to do? How do you want to do it?’”

In addition to filmmaking, Winter created Sexucation, an educational project offering workshops and media content about birth control, polyamory, and sexual communication. She also provides desire and arousal coaching. Curator Jasmin Hagendorfer interviewed Winter for the German art and film festival B3 Biennial of the Moving Image about her work in filmmaking and coaching.

== Media coverage ==
Winter's personal journey and work have been covered in several international outlets. Vice’s Growing Up in a Sex Cult discussed her upbringing in Friedrichshof and her later career as a feminist adult filmmaker. Slate highlighted her role in redefining erotic filmmaking from a female perspective. She has also been profiled by XBIZ and featured in Hustler Magazine. Her work has been discussed in outlets such as Vice, Slate, and the Frankfurter Allgemeine Zeitung.

== Awards and recognition ==
- Nominations at the XBIZ Awards and AVN Awards.
- Screenings at international erotic and independent film festivals.
