= Foursome (group sex) =

Form of group sex involving four people

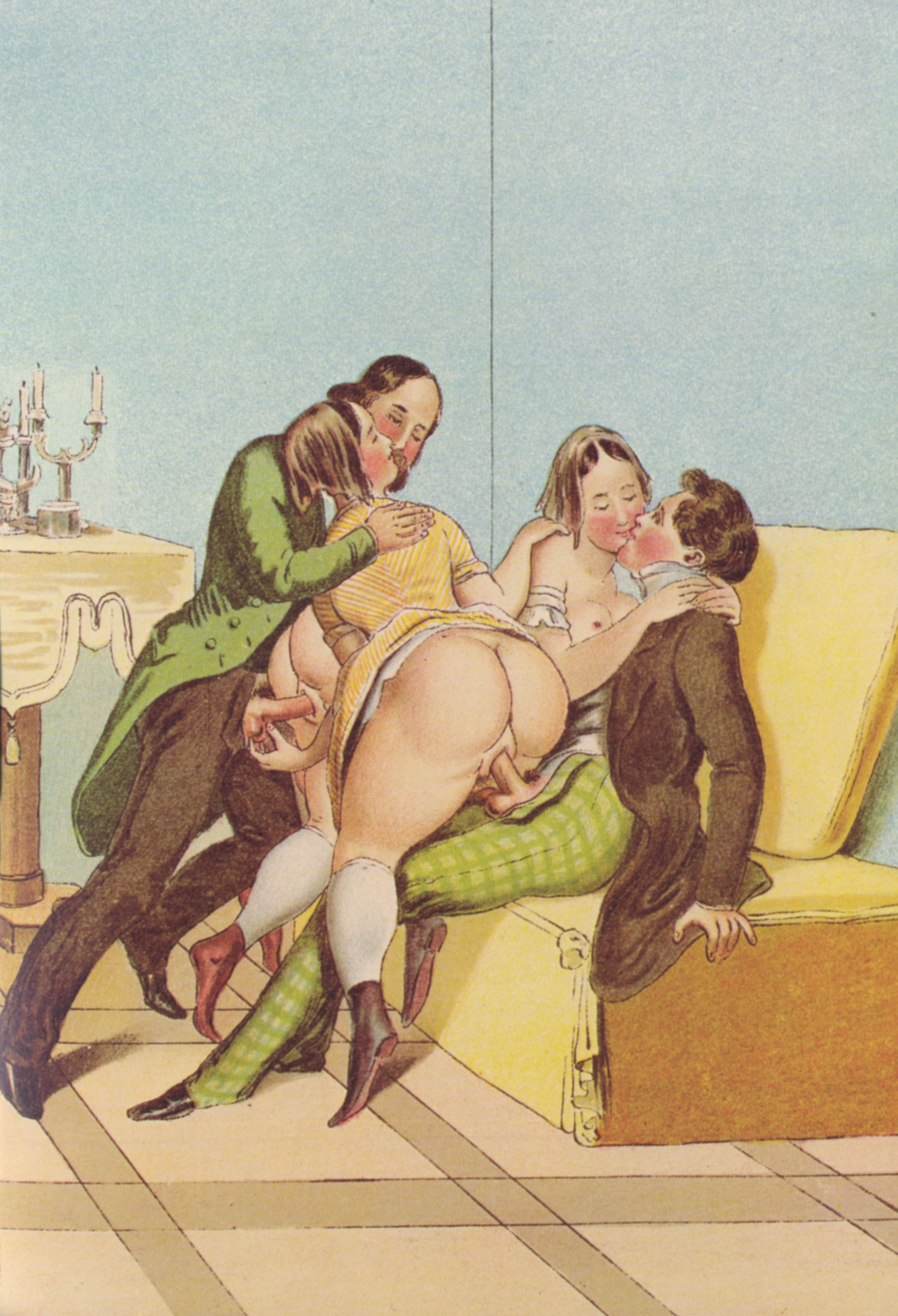
Two couples in a foursome. Painting (misleadingly attributed to) Peter Fendi.

A foursome is a form of group sex involving four people of any gender combination.

== Types of foursomes ==
The level of sexual activity among the four members may vary greatly. Other foursomes may involve some same sex contact, and some foursomes actively involve all four members.

=== Wife swapping ===
Wife swapping involves two couples, usually both married heterosexual pairs, where each man swaps his wife for the other, and has sexual intercourse with her. There is usually no sexual contact between the two wives or the two husbands.

=== Soft swinging ===
Soft swinging involves two couples, where either one couple has a voyeuristic role watching the other have sex, or the couples each have sex but with no sexual contact between the two pairs.

=== Gang bangs ===
A gang bang involves three (or more) people having sex with a fourth successively. It involves both heterosexual and homosexual acts.

=== Reverse gang bangs ===
Sexual intercourse involving multiple women in which one man is the central focus.

=== Airtight seal ===
The airtight seal involves vaginal sex and anal sex performed on a woman by two men in a double penetration, while the woman performs fellatio on a third man.

=== Quads ===
A quad is a romantic relationship involving four people. It is most commonly used to describe a love relationship between two couples where it takes the form of a square, in which all four people have a love relationship with each other.

While it can refer to two people independently romantically linked with two others, it usually implies that each of the four people has some kind of sexual relationship to the other three. The relationships are normally friendships, though romantic. Addition of bisexual or homosexual characters adds many possible combinations of sexes, and of romantic and sexual interactions.

== Gallery ==
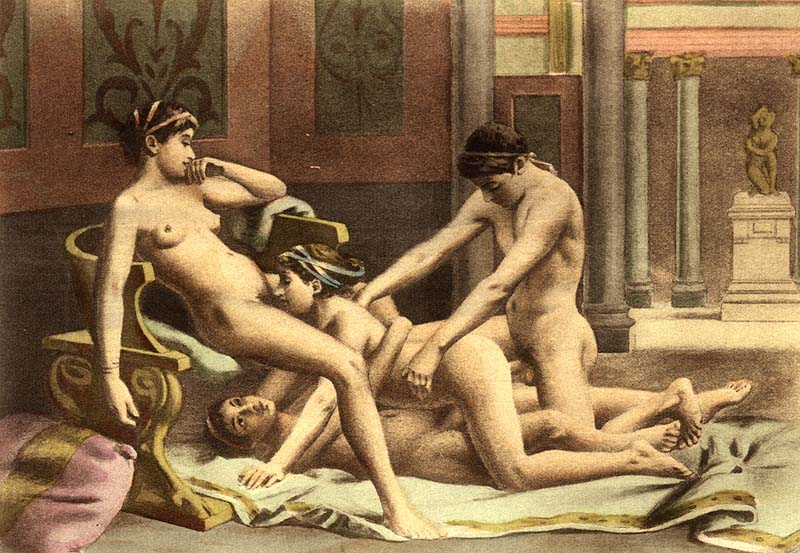
Painting by Édouard-Henri Avril: two women and two men having a foursome.

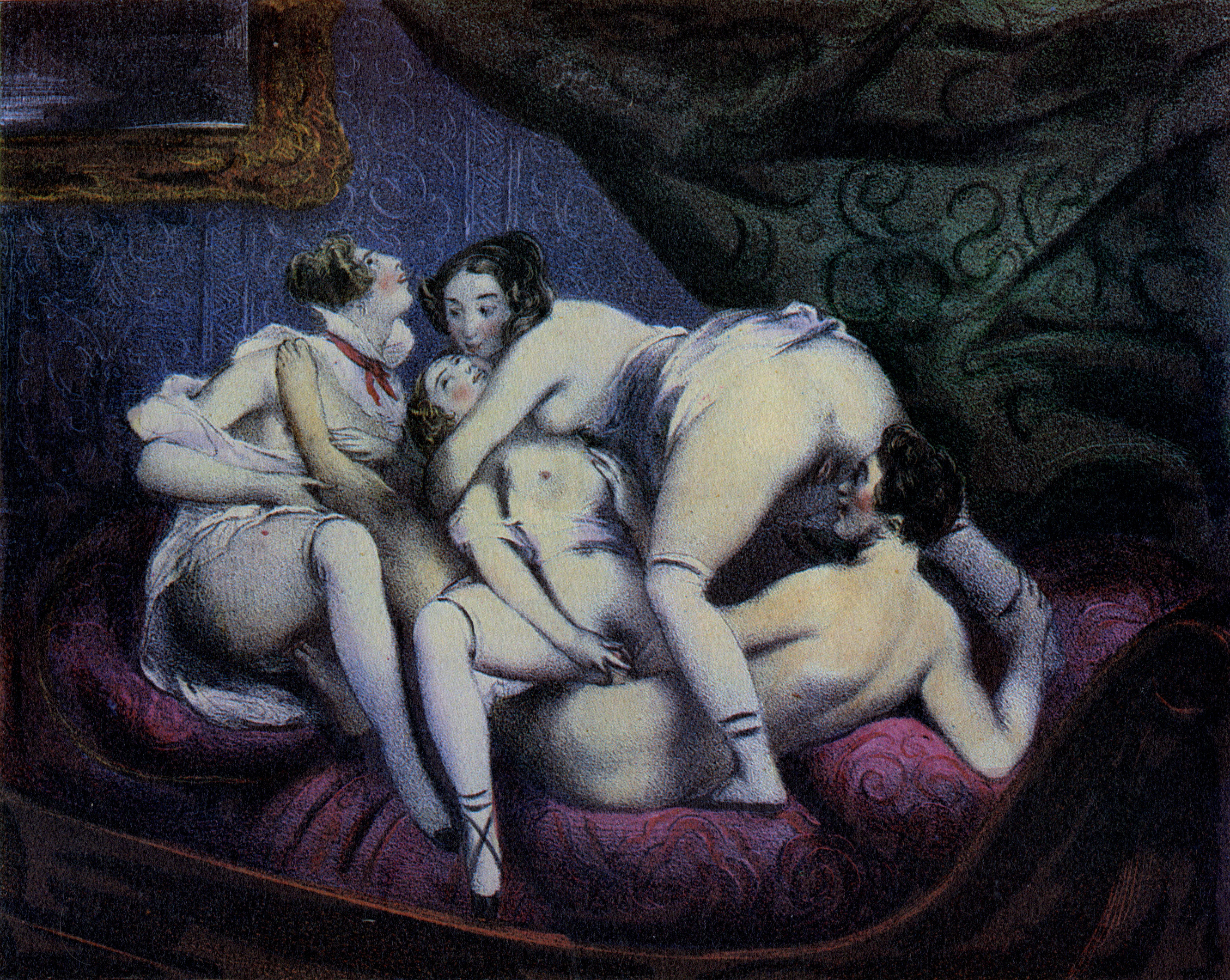
Painting attributed to Achille Devéria, of three women and a man having a foursome

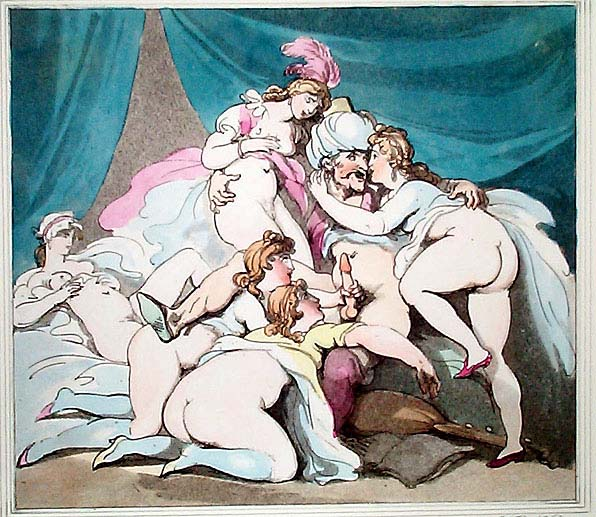
Depiction of a reverse gang bang by Thomas Rowlandson

== See also ==
- Polyamory
- Swinging
- Threesome
