= Threesome =

Sexual activity that involves three people at the same time

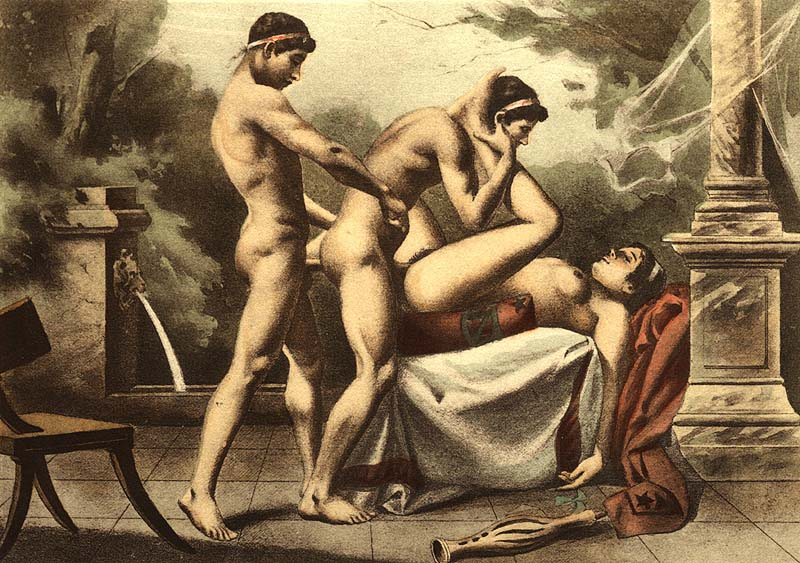
Threesome involving two men and a woman

In human sexuality, a threesome is "a sexual interaction between three people whereby at least one engages in physical sexual behaviour with both the other individuals". While the term threesome typically refers to sexual activity involving three participants, it has at times been used to refer to a long-term domestic relationship, such as polyamory or a ménage à trois.

A threesome is a form of group sex that typically occurs in private settings, such as spontaneous sexual activity among three friends or in the context of casual sex or a hook up. A threesome may occur in specific contexts or environments that allow for sex, such as swingers events, orgies, or sex parties. Threesomes are a common element of sexual fantasy, and are widely depicted in pornography.

== Types ==
The people in a threesome may be of any gender and sexual orientation. Each participant may engage in any type of sex act with one or both of the others, such as vaginal, anal, oral, or manual sex. One or more of the participants may engage in autoerotic sexual activity, such as masturbation, possibly without physical contact with the other participants. It is a matter of subjective definition whether participation of a third person without physical contact constitutes a threesome and this sort of sexual activity might instead be interpreted as voyeurism or cuckolding or cuckqueaning. Troilism is a term that encompasses both threesomes and cuckoldry, although its usage across literature is inconsistent.

Threesomes are sometimes described using shorthand to refer to who was involved in the threesome e.g. MMF (male, male, female); FFM (female, female, male); MMM (male, male, male); FFF (female, female, female).

Sandwich is slang for a person performing both receptive and insertive anal and/or vaginal sex simultaneously during a threesome, being positioned between the two partners.

== Academic research ==
The first major academic work to address threesomes specifically was published in 1988, called: Threesomes: Studies in Sex, Power, and Intimacy by Arno Karlen. In the work, drawing mainly from interview data, Karlen outlined how threesomes were often viewed as qualitatively different to other forms of group sex. Other notable findings include that threesomes were often viewed by women as a safe way to explore their sexuality; they often consisted of a couple joined by a third person; and that the third person was not necessarily viewed or treated equally. Karlen also suggested that the societal view of threesomes cast those who engaged in them as radically different to other members of society:

There is a common tendency to think of people who have been in threesomes as alien beings. Like swingers, homosexuals and others who deviate from basic sexual norms, they seem to many to have entered another social, psychological, and moral sphere.

Research exploring rates of threesome engagement suggest that men have both higher levels of interest and participation in threesomes. One study soliciting responses to a sex survey via a British newspaper in 1987 found that 34% of 1,862 men, and 15% of 2,905 women had experience of a threesome. From a nationally representative sample in the US in 2017, 34.1% of men and 11.1% of women found a threesome to be at least somewhat appealing and 18% of men and 10% of women had engaged in one.

== In art ==
Threesomes in various positions depicted in art:

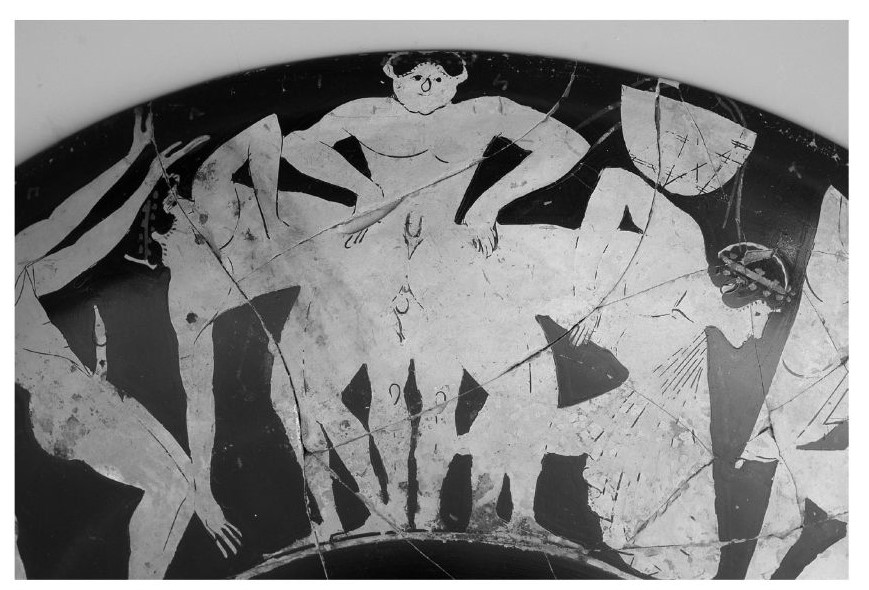
Three young men in an unusual position (Greek)

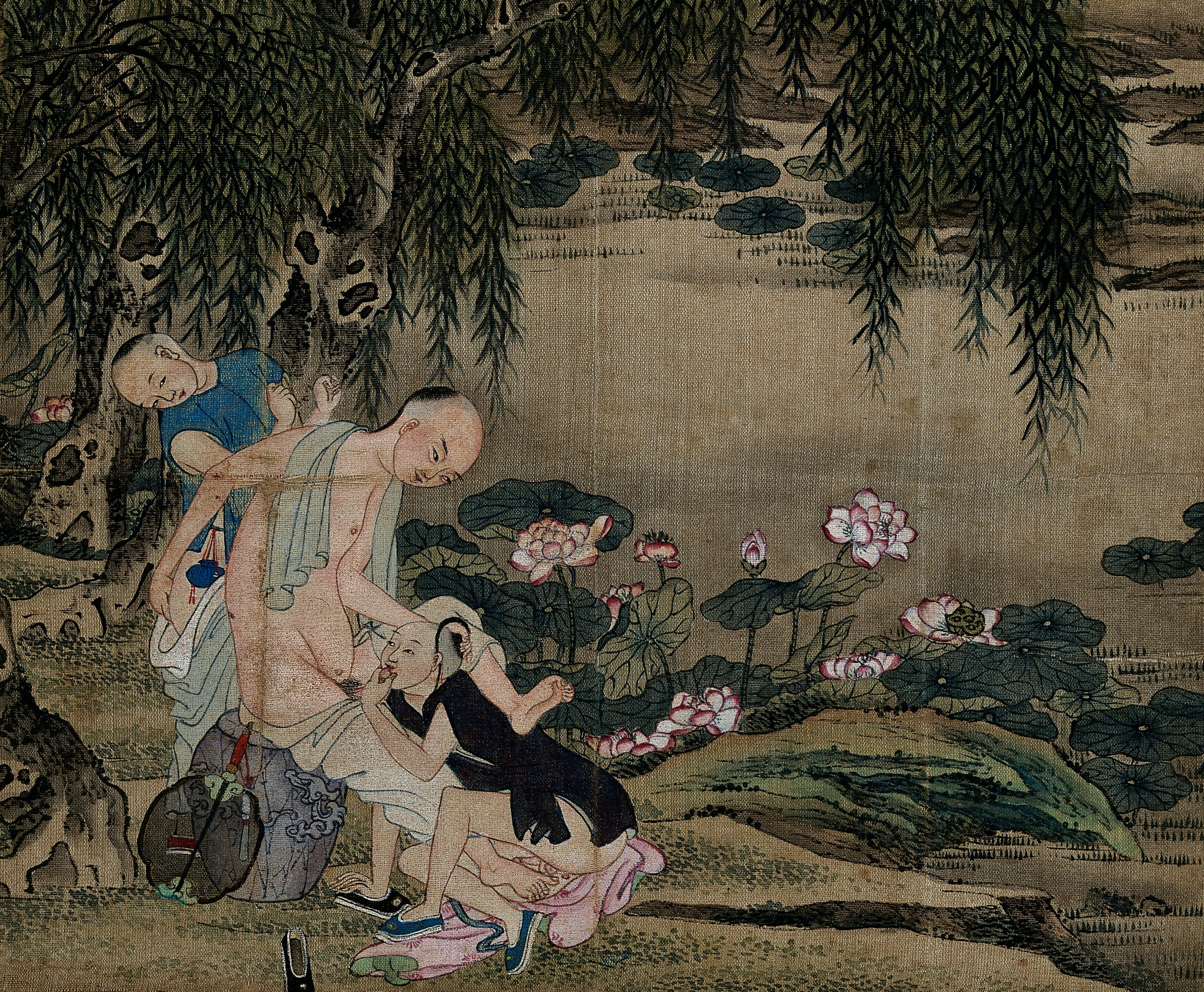
A man and two male youths (Chinese)

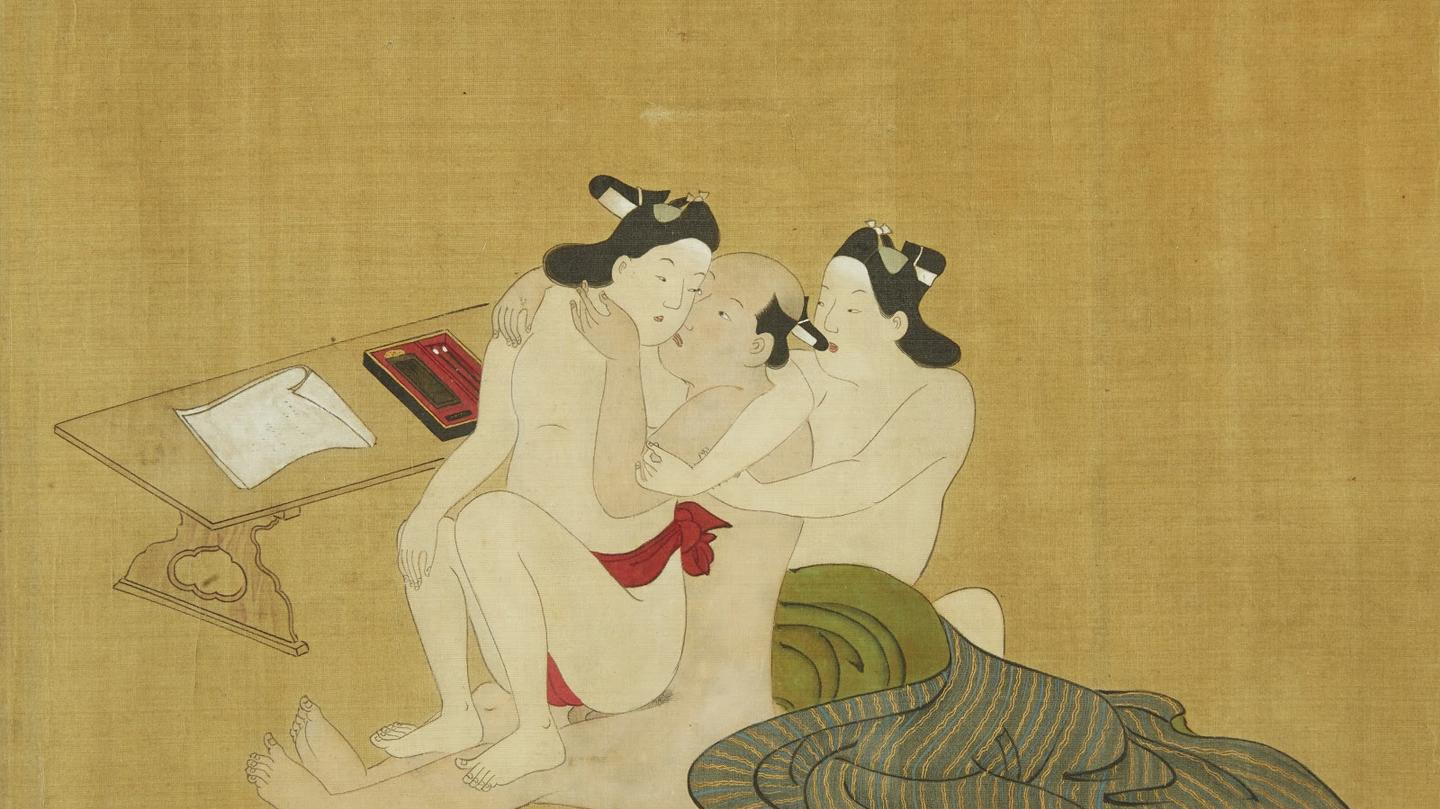
A man and two male youths (Japanese)

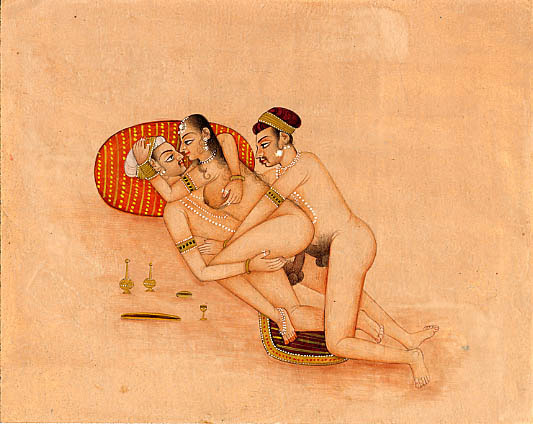
Threesome involving double penetration

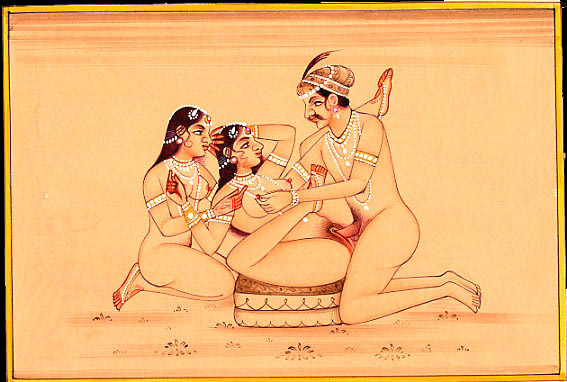
Threesome involving two women and a man

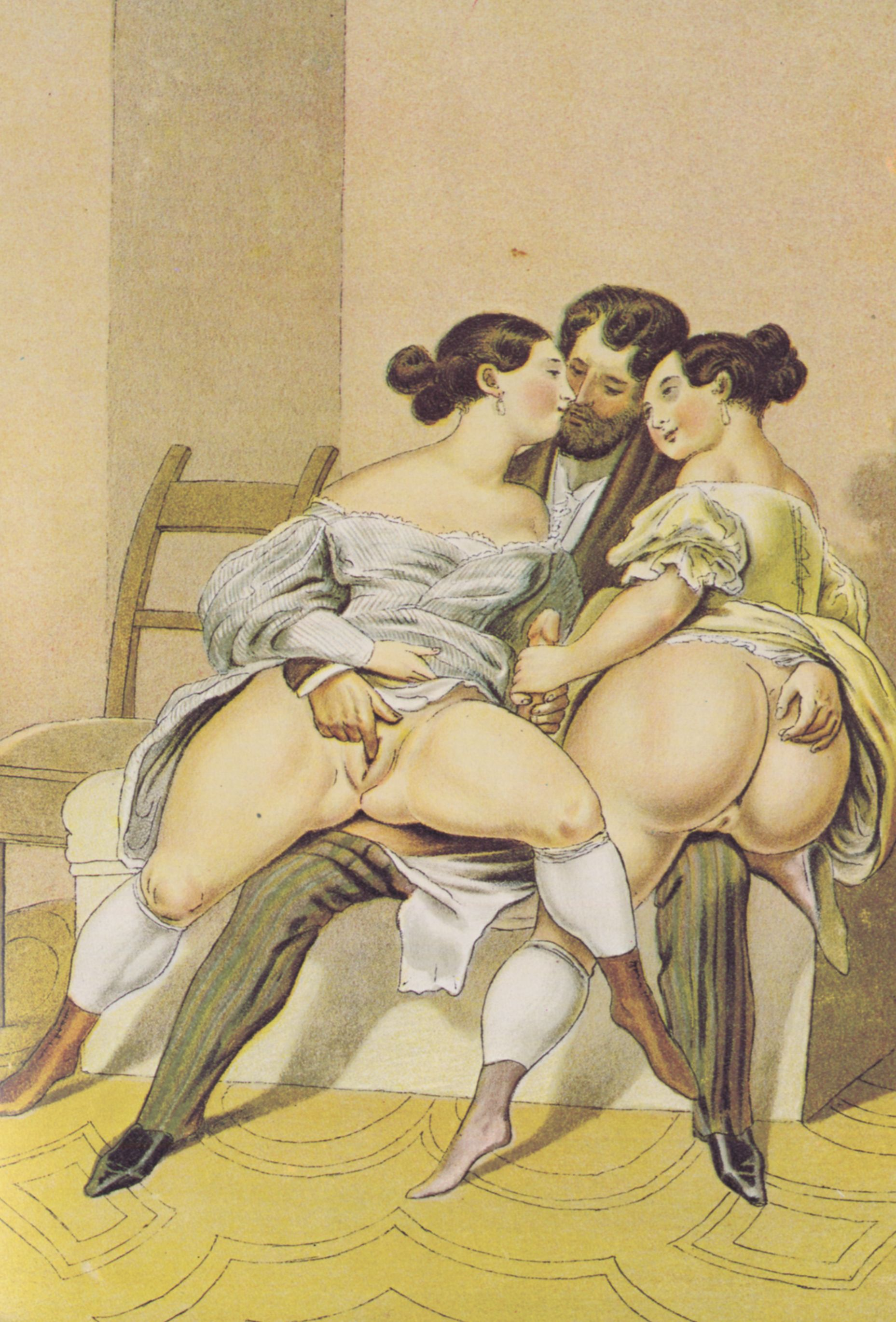
"Der Gemeinsame Freund" ("The Mutual Friend") attributed to Peter Fendi

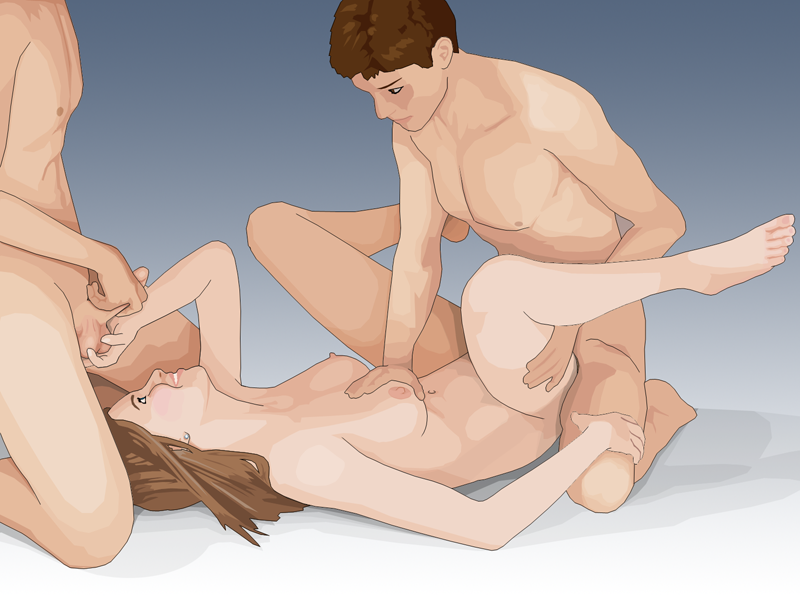
Seedfeeder's illustration of a threesome involving two men and a woman

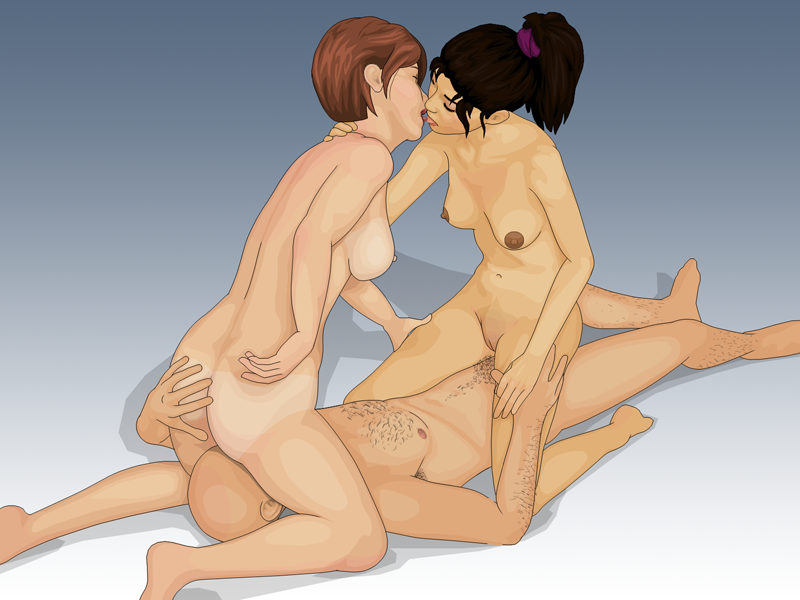
Seedfeeder's illustration of a threesome involving two women and a man

== In popular culture ==
Threesome scenes are featured in various films and TV series, including Summer Lovers (1982), Threesome (1994), Wild Things (1998), American Psycho (2000), Zoolander (2001), Y Tu Mamá También (2001), Ken Park (2002), The Dreamers (2003), Kiss Me Again (2006), Shortbus (2006), Vicky Cristina Barcelona (2008), Shame (2011), 21 Jump Street (2012), On the Road (2012), Savages (2012), Spring Breakers (2012), Knock Knock (2015), Love (2015). Basic Instinct 2 (2006) was originally intended to include a threesome scene, but this was cut out.

== See also ==
- Adultery
- Bigamy
- Bisexuality
- Compersion
- Foursome
- Open marriage
- Orgy
- Polygamy

== Bibliography ==
- Benoit, Sophia (2019-07-24). "How to Have a Successful Threesome, According to People Who Have a Lot of Them". GQ.
- Druckerman, Pamela (2023-04-23). "'It was hard to keep track of who was at which stage': what I learned from a threesome". The Guardian.
- Hsieh, Carina (2020-10-08). "What It's Really Like to Have a Threesome". Cosmopolitan.
- Hunt, Elle (2020-02-11). "The psychology of the threesome: everyone wants one, but who's truly ready for it?". The Guardian.
