= Anodic aluminium oxide =

Form of aluminium oxide

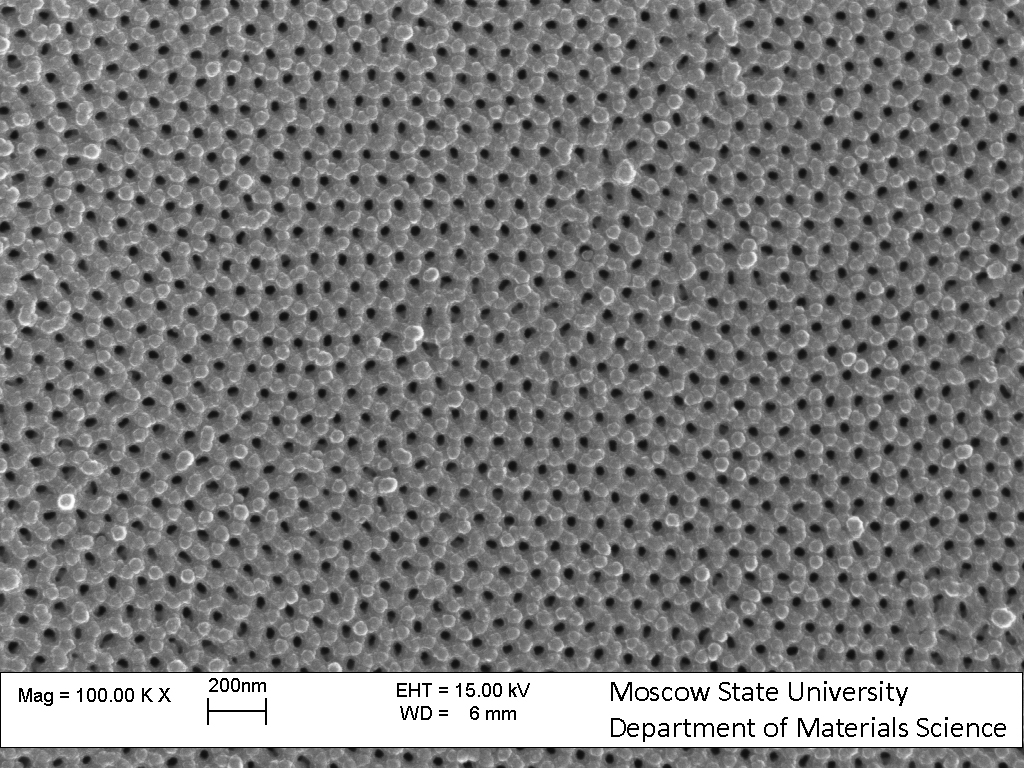
Top-view scanning electron microscopy image of AAO

Anodic aluminum oxide, anodic aluminum oxide (AAO), or anodic alumina is a self-organized form of aluminum oxide that has a honeycomb-like structure formed by high density arrays of uniform and parallel pores. The diameter of the pores can be as low as 5 nanometers and as high as several hundred nanometers, and length can be controlled from few tens of nanometers to few hundred micrometers. Porous AAO is formed by electrochemical oxidation (anodization) of aluminum in acid electrolytes in the conditions that balance the growth and the AAO films are formed with limited thickness.

Anodizing aluminum has been widely used since early last century for corrosion protection and decorative purposes. The porous nature of anodic alumina films was discovered in the 1930s and further elaborated in the 1950s–1970s. Processes for producing anodic aluminum oxide membranes using chromic acid, sulfuric acid, oxalic acid, or phosphoric acid appear in a patent attributed to Alan W. Smith of the Boeing Company in 1974.

The formation of AAO with highly ordered 2D hexagonal porous structure was first demonstrated in 1995. Further empirical research of anodization processes showed that well-ordered AAO structures can be generated solely within narrow windows of applied voltages. The study of these self-ordering conditions received a great impetus when the electroconvective nature of hexagonal cells in AAO was discovered. At these voltages which correspond to stable self-ordering conditions, AAO cells of equal size are formed and neatly packed into a hexagonal lattice. However, an array consisting of electroconvective cells with different sizes emerges within the intermediate voltage ranges, which appears like a chaotic arrangement.

Starting in the late 1980s, owing to uniform nanostructure, AAO began to attract interest in the area of nanotechnology, in particular as a template for deposition of the uniform arrays of nanowires. Since several key publications on using AAO for bottom-up templated nanofabrication appeared by the mid-1990s, AAO became widely recognized and very popular platform for design and synthesis of high density arrays of nanostructures (nanowires, nanotubes) and functional nanocomposites.

AAO-based nanomaterials have a broad range of applications, from nanoelectronics and magnetic storage media to photonics and energy conversion to nanoporous substrates and nanotags for bioanalysis. The number of AAO-related publications in this area greatly increased since 1990s, with over 75% of the papers focused on use of AAO in nanotechnology.

The significance of AAO in science and technology is underpinned by the fact that its structure and chemistry could be controllably engineered at the nanoscale over very large areas and in practical formats, enabling development of new materials and products with desired properties and functionality. For example, AAO membranes have been used as a platform for chemical and biological sensors. Protein molecules like thrombin have been detected using AAO membranes.
