= Melissa Stratton =

American pornographic film actress and model (born 1989)

- Born: 1989 (age 36–37)
- Occupations: Pornographic film actress; model
- Years active: 2022–present

Melissa Stratton (born 1989) is an American pornographic film actress and model.

== Career ==
Stratton launched an AI digital companion in 2023, Melissa AI, which offered both AI voice notes and text chats. In February 2024, she accepted a six-figure offer to perform at several of Larry Flynt's strip clubs.

Stratton received two AVN Awards nominations in 2024. She hosted the 2026 XMZ Awards ceremony in Los Angeles. Also in 2026, Stratton was nominated for two AVN Awards, including for her collaboration with 2 Drops and Kylie Rocket.

In March of 2026, Melissa was featured in a new Dorcel film Luxure - Indecent Wives directed by Ricky Greenwood along with fellow star Vanna Bardot.

== Awards ==
- 2024 AVN Award Nominee Award Best New Starlet
- 2026 AVN Award Nominee Favorite Star Creator
- 2026 AVN Award Nominee Hottest Boy / Girl Creator Collab with 2 Drops
- 2026 AVN Award Nominee Hottest Group Creator Collab with 2 Drops & Kylie Rocket

== Personal life ==
Stratton grew up in Utah, in a Mormon military family which she stated left her "sexually repressed" and led to her decision to seek greater freedom through entering the adult film industry.

In mid-February 2024, it was reported by TMZ that Stratton was dating Hot Ones host Sean Evans after posting together during the Super Bowl. The couple broke up soon after, with Stratton stating that the public mockery that followed Evans after the announcement was too overwhelming.
