= Emma Magnolia =

American pornographic film actress (born 1992/1993)

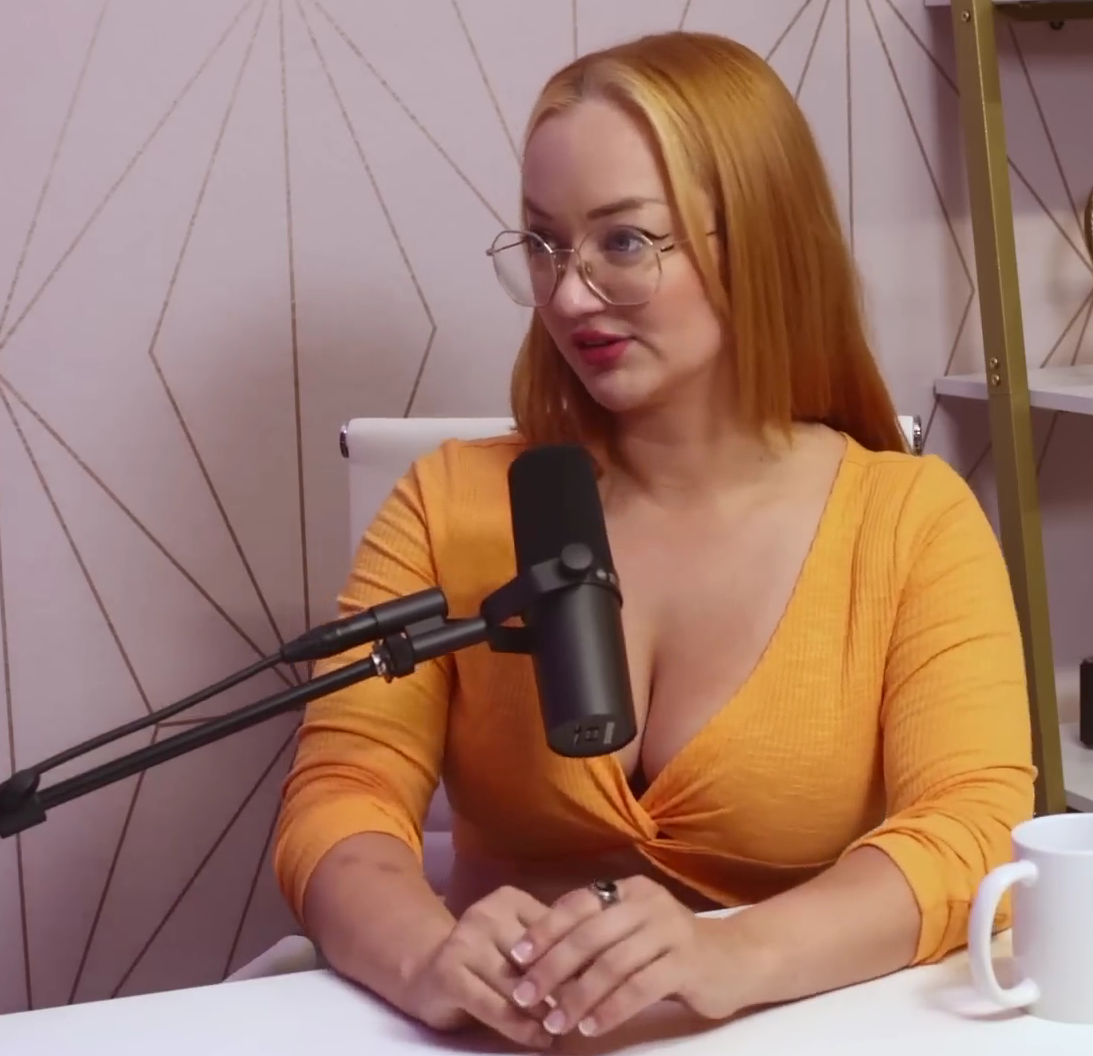
- Magnolia in 2023
- Born: 1992 or 1993 (age 33–34)
- Occupations: Pornographic film actress; model
- Awards: AVN Awards, Pornhub Award, XBIZ Award

Emma Magnolia (born 1992 or 1993) is an American pornographic film actress and model. She was a winner at the AVN Awards (2024), Pornhub Awards (2024), and XMA Awards (2026).

== Biography ==
Magnolia studied at a college in Arkansas, where she obtained a degree in biology. After graduating, she began working on a farm. She had her own farm where she grew vegetables and sold them at the local market. During this time, she became interested in punk rock and began living in punk houses, where concerts were held for donations.

=== Pornographic film career ===
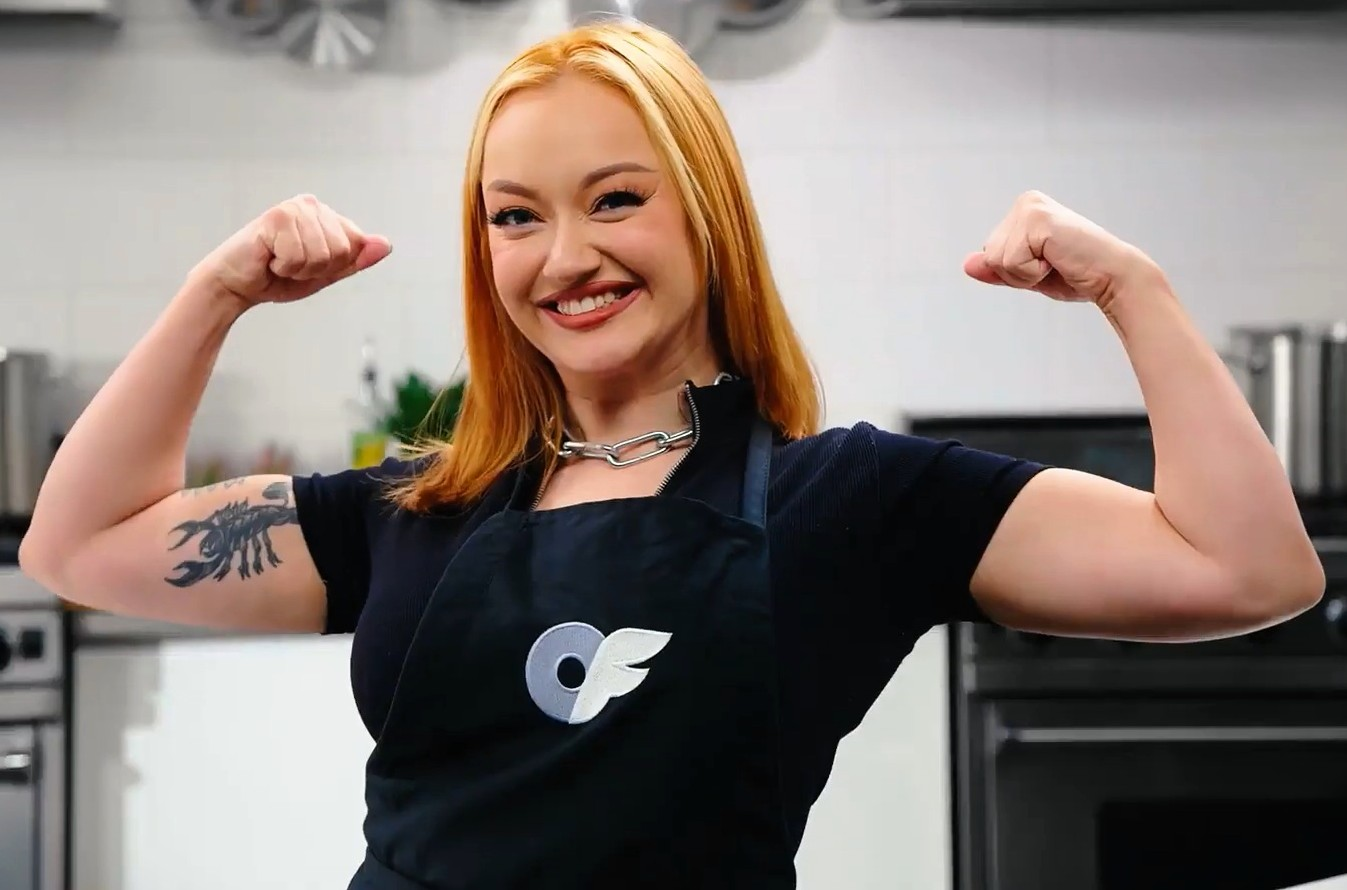
Magnolia posing for OnlyFans in 2023

Magnolia began her career at the start of the COVID-19 pandemic, searching for alternative ways to earn money online. In March 2020, she registered on OnlyFans.

== Personal life ==
In 2022, she moved to Los Angeles and continues to live there. She enjoys gardening and has her own garden.

In an interview with Forbes, she said that she believes the best way to get started on social media is to "communicate with fans on a personal level and share your interests."

== Awards and nominations ==
Year	Award	Category	Work	Result
2023	Urban X Awards	Most Amazing Ass	—	Nominated
2023	Urban X Awards	Most Amazing Big Breasts	—	Nominated
2023	AVN Awards	Fan Award: Hottest Adult Newcomer	—	Nominated
2024	AVN Awards	Best New Starlet	—	Nominated
2024	AVN Awards	Fan Award: Hottest Adult Newcomer	—	Won
2024	AVN Awards	Fan Award: Most Amazing Ass	—	Nominated
2025	TEA Show	Best Non-TS Female Performer	—	Nominated
2026	XMA Fan Awards	Favorite Female Creator	—	Nominated
2026	XMA Awards	Female Content Creator of the Year	—	Nominated
