= Sweetie Fox =

Russian pornographic film actress (born 2001)

- Born: 2001 (age 24–25); Yekaterinburg, Russia
- Occupation: Pornographic film actress
- Awards: Pornhub Awards (2022–2025); AVN Awards (2024)
- Website: www.sweetiefox.com

Sweetie Fox (born 2001) is a Russian pornographic film actress, model, and cosplayer.

== Career ==
In 2022, Sweetie Fox won her first award at the Pornhub Awards in the category "Favorite Cosplayer". In 2023, she was ranked among the top 20 Russian porn actresses by the magazine Maxim.

In January 2024, she took first place in the ranking of most popular models on Pornhub. That same year, she appeared on the cover of the magazine AVN for the first time.

== Personal life ==
She was born in Yekaterinburg, Sverdlovsk Oblast, Russia.

Sweetie Fox met her husband while training in fencing. She enjoys saber sparring, and handicraft in her free time. She also studies art history and works out regularly.

== Awards and nominations ==
Year	Award	Category	Result	Ref.
2021	AltPorn Awards	Best Clip Artist of the Year (2021)	Nominated	
2022	AltPorn Awards	Best Clip Artist of the Year (2021)	Nominated	
2022	Bazowie Awards	Best Clip Artist of the Year (2021)	Nominated	
2022	Pornhub Awards	Favorite Cosplayer	Won	
2023	Pornhub Awards	Most Popular Amateur	Won	
2023	Pornhub Awards	Most Popular Female Performer	Nominated	
2023	Pornhub Awards	Favorite Cosplayer	Nominated	
2023	Bazowie Awards	Best Kawaii Cosplayer	Nominated	
2023	Bazowie Awards	Best Fandom Clip Artist	Nominated	
2024	AVN Awards	Most Spectacular Boobs	Nominated	
2024	AVN Awards	Favorite Cosplayer	Won	
2024	Pornhub Awards	Favorite Cosplayer	Won	
2025	Pornhub Awards	Most Popular Amateur Model	Won	
2025	XMA Creator Awards	Cosplay Clip Creator of the Year	Won	
2026	Pornhub Awards	Favorite Cosplayer	Won	
2026	Pornhub Awards	Favorite Female Amateur Model	Won	
2026	XMA Europa Awards	Cosplay Creator of the Year	Won	
