= Group sex =

Sexual behavior involving more than two participants

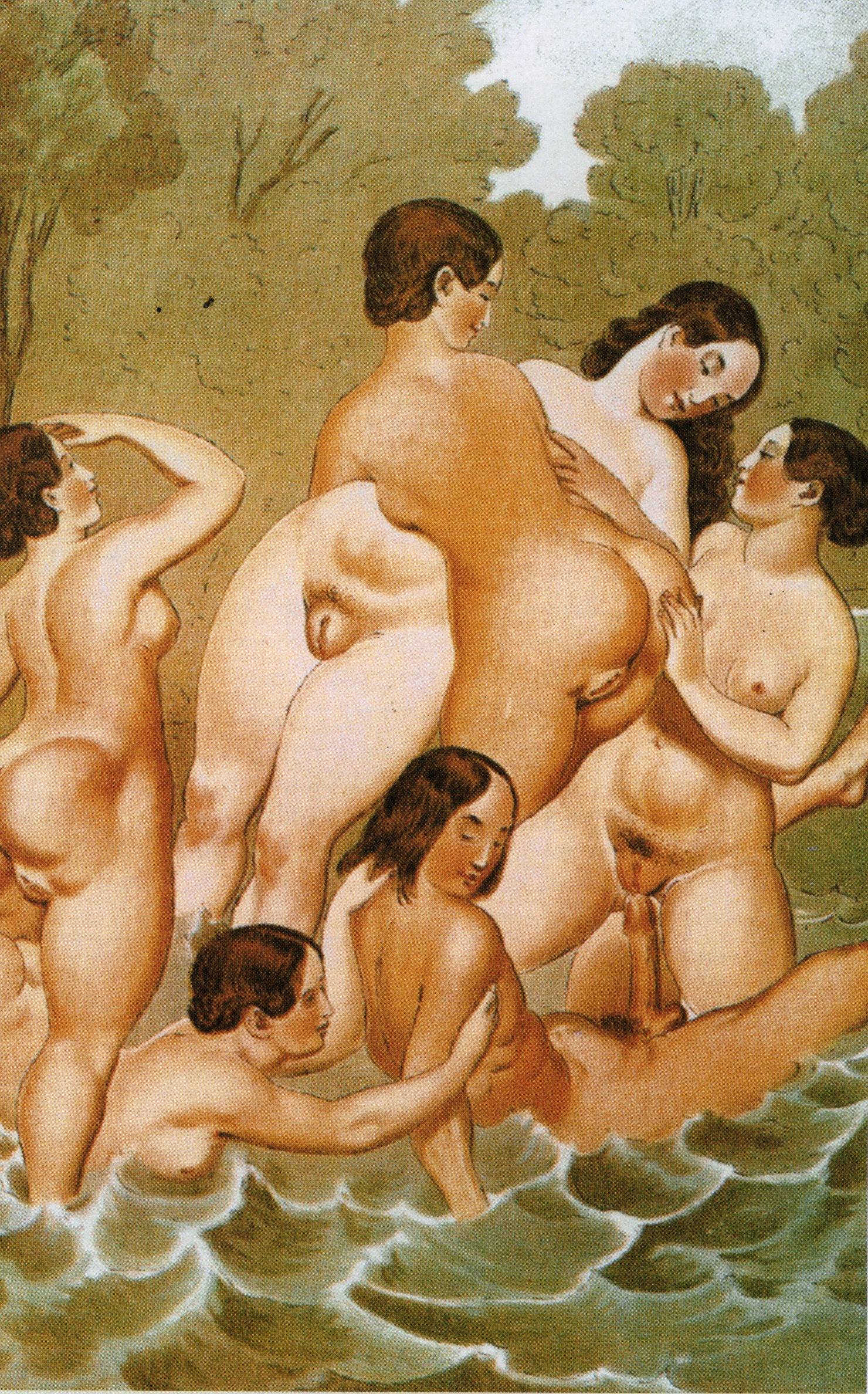
Erotic scene (1835) by Peter Fendi depicting participants engaged in group sex

Group sex is sexual activity involving more than two people. Participants in group sex can be of any sexual orientation or gender. Any form of sexual activity can be adopted to involve more than two participants, but some forms have their own names.

Group sex most commonly takes place in a private sex party or semi-public swinger gathering, but may also take place at massage parlors or brothels or, in some jurisdictions, at purpose-built locations such as sex clubs. In places where non-monogamous sex is taboo or illegal, group sex may take place in private or clandestine locations including homes, hotel rooms, or private clubs.

Fantasies of group sex are extremely common among both men and women. Many forms of sexual behavior were reported by Alfred Kinsey's subjects, but the official Kinsey Reports website does not mention threesomes or group sex in the summary of Kinsey's findings.

Group sex is a popular subgenre in pornographic films.

== Terms ==
In principle, any sexual behavior performed by more than two people can be referred to as group sex, but various terms are used to describe particular acts or combinations of people. Many swingers argue that non-swingers have conflated the terms because of lack of understanding and that there are distinct differences among the terms with specific meanings as to number, intent, sexual orientation, and familiarity of the persons involved.

- Circle jerk: Group masturbation among men, usually sitting in somewhat of a circle formation.
- Daisy chain: Group of participants perform cunnilingus or fellatio on each other in a circular formation, permitting each participant to both give and receive oral sex simultaneously.
- Gang bang: A number of people performing sex acts on one person, either in turn or at the same time. Sexual intercourse involving multiple women in which one man is the central focus is called reverse gang bang.
- Threesome or three-way: Three people all having sexual relations, not necessarily simultaneously. Not to be confused with ménage à trois (literally, "household of three").
- Foursome or four-way: Sex between four people. Not to be confused with ménage à quatre (literally, "household of four").
- Double penetration: When a person is entered or penetrated in the vagina and/or anus by two people at the same time. This is usually when one person enters the anus while another enters the vagina; however, it also refers to two simultaneous penetrations in the same orifice.
- Monogamous group sex or same room sex (a.k.a. soft swapping): Couples engaging in sexual activity in the same room but in separate pairs, without any swapping of partners or other major sexual activity between couples.
- Spintrian: A term used by Suetonius to describe sexual group practices indulged in by the emperor Tiberius on Capri.

== Types of sex party ==
A sex party is a gathering at which sexual activity takes place. There are a number of types of sex parties.

=== Orgy ===
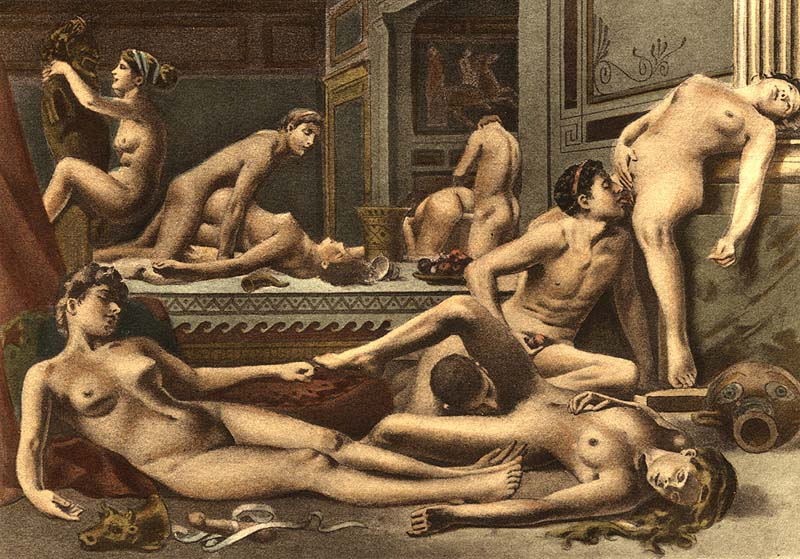
Illustration of an orgy by Édouard-Henri Avril

An orgy is a gathering where guests freely engage in open and unrestrained sexual activity or group sex; and a bunga bunga orgy is an orgy in which participants have sex underwater, such as in a swimming pool or a hot tub.

=== Swinger party ===
A swinger party or partner-swapping party is a gathering at which individuals or couples in a committed relationship can engage in sexual activities with others as a recreational or social activity.

Swinger parties may involve various group sex activities. Partners can engage in penetrative sex, known as "full swap", or choose to "soft swap" in which they engage only in non-penetrative sex. New swinging couples often choose a soft swap before they are comfortable with a full swap, although many couples stay soft swap for personal reasons. "Soft swinging" is when a couple engages in sexual activities with only each other while other couples perform sex acts in the immediate vicinity. Technically this is a form of exhibitionism rather than "group sex" per se.

== Health ==
As with all sexual activity, the relative risks of group sex depend on the specific activities engaged in, although having a large number of sexual partners increases one's risk of exposure to sexually transmitted infections (STIs).

From the mid-1980s there was active lobbying against gay bathhouses, blaming them for the spread of STIs, in particular HIV, and this forced closures in some jurisdictions, particularly in the United States. Sociologist Stephen O. Murray writes that, "there was never any evidence presented that going to bathhouses was a risk-factor for contracting AIDS." This statement ignored the fact that few studies had been done. Later studies have confirmed a higher risk of STI from bathhouses. In other countries, fears about the spread of STIs have prompted the closing of bathhouses—with their private rooms—in favour of sex clubs, in which all sexual activity takes place in the open, and can be observed by monitors whose job it is to enforce safer sex practices.

Proponents claim that venues where group sex takes place often provide condoms, dental dams, latex gloves, lubricants and other items for safer sex, although they cannot prove that those items are used and use is typically not mandated. Bathhouses in particular are a major source of safer sex information—they provide pamphlets and post safer sex posters prominently (often on the walls of each room as well as in the common areas), provide free condoms and lubricants, and often require patrons to affirm that they will only have safer sex on the premises.

== Prevalence ==
In a 2015 US survey, a significantly larger percentage of men than women responded that they had any lifetime experience of a threesome (17.8 vs 10.3) or group sex (11.5 vs 6.3).

== Law ==
The Sexual Offences Act 1967 decriminalized homosexual acts between two men over 21 years of age in private in England and Wales; however, the privacy restrictions of the Act meant a third person could not participate in the sex or even be present, as well as that the two men could not have sex in a hotel. These restrictions were overturned in the European Court of Human Rights in 2000.

Section 20A of the Immorality Act, 1957, commonly known as the "men at a party" clause, was a South African law that criminalized all sexual acts between men that occurred in the presence of a third person. The section was enacted by the Immorality Amendment Act, 1969 and remained in force until it was found to be unconstitutional in 1998 by the Constitutional Court in the case of National Coalition for Gay and Lesbian Equality v Minister of Justice.

A 1996 sexual harassment case filed against Mitsubishi Motor Manufacturing of America by the Equal Employment Opportunity Commission (EEOC) highlighted corporate involvement by Mitsubishi in sex parties arranged by managers and other employees.

Group sex is illegal in China, due to Article 301 of China's 1997 Criminal Law which bans "group licentiousness".

In Canada, in a 2002 decision regarding a case in which three people were engaged in sexual intercourse, the Court of Queen's Bench of Alberta declared section 159 of the Criminal Code in its entirety to be null, including the provisions criminalizing anal sex when more than two persons are taking part or present. In June 2019, C-75 passed both houses of the Parliament of Canada and received royal assent, repealing section 159 effective immediately.

Until 2021, Section 9 of the Sexual Offences Act 1992 continued to apply the criminal law to some "unnatural offences" between men in the Isle of Man, and sub-sections (1) and (4) made "buggery" and "gross indecency" between men offences not only if one or both of the parties was under sixteen but also if the acts were committed "elsewhere than in private." The meaning of this was defined in Section 10: not in private meant that "more than two persons are present" or that the location is "any place to which the public have or are permitted to have access, whether on payment or otherwise." In 2021, the "more than two persons are present" specification was deleted, and the language prohibiting "indecent exposure" and "sexual activity in a public place" was made gender-neutral.

== Media portrayals ==
Sex parties, under various names, have been a common focus of moral panics fed by media reports claiming that such parties are prevalent, or growing in prevalence, especially among teenagers.

Sensational media reports about the prevalence of sex parties, especially among young people, appear with some regularity. In the early 1950s, for example, it was alleged that teenage girls, mainly throughout the Southern and Midwestern United States were forming "non-virgin clubs", in which they organized and held sex orgies with reports of couples being paired off by drawing numbers from a hat. These claims were investigated and debunked.

Several stories of this type arose in the US in 2003. In New York, rumors began that teens had been taking days off from school to attend "hooky parties" while their parents were at work. One school even suspended a group of girls for allegedly skipping school to attend such a party, refusing to let them return to school until each had submitted to a medical examination for sexually transmitted infections and pregnancy, and school officials were allowed to examine the results. The New York Civil Liberties Union filed a federal lawsuit against the school on behalf of the girls and won a settlement which included monetary damages and a change in the school district's policy.

A rainbow party is a baseless urban legend spread from the early 2000s. At these events, females wearing various shades of lipstick reportedly took turns fellating males in sequence, leaving multiple colours on their penises, ignoring the fact that in such a situation the colors would blend. Rainbow parties were covered on The Oprah Winfrey Show in 2003, and became the subject of a juvenile novel called Rainbow Party. On May 27, 2010, the television program The Doctors discussed the topic with dozens of teens, parents, and professionals. However, sex researchers and adolescent health care professionals have found no evidence for the existence of rainbow parties, and as such attribute the spread of the stories to a moral panic.

Similar stories concerning teenagers using gel bracelets as coupons or signals for sex also arose at the time, with a similar lack of corroborating evidence.

== See also ==
- Sex positions of groups
