= SexLikeReal =

Virtual reality company

- Website type: Pornographic video sharing
- Available in: English
- Country of origin: Cyprus
- Area served: Worldwide
- Key people: Alex Novak
- Industry: Virtual reality pornography video sharing site; VR live cam streaming; production company; VR technology developer
- Website: www.sexlikereal.com
- Advertising: Yes
- Registration: Optional
- Launched: 2015

SexLikeReal is a virtual reality pornography sharing site, VR live cam streaming, production company and VR technology developer. It was launched in 2015 with the top Studios such as VR Bangers, VR Conk, BadoinkVR, Virtualrealporn and more than one of the largest Netflix-like platforms for VR pornography, SexLikeReal has been featured by XBIZ and other major media outlets in the adult entertainment industry. According to Venture Beat, SexLikeReal is pioneering in merging adult entertainment with VR technology.

== History ==
SexLikeReal was founded by Alex Novak in 2015.

In 2016, SexLikeReal released a VR porn app for Android and Windows.

In 2018, SexLikeReal's VR app has been downloaded by more than 600,000 users.

In 2019, SLR launched an Android app to support interactive teledildonics synchronized with video like Fleshlight Launch, powered by Kiiroo.

In 2020, SexLikeReal reported 1.5 million monthly users. SexLikeReal developed a native VR porn app to watch videos since web browsers could not playback high-resolution videos, with 5K/6K 180º stereoscopic 60FPS becoming a standard.

In early 2022, SexLikeReal released the first ever 8K 30FPS and 8K 60FPS VR porn videos.

== Overview ==
The platform brings together over 13,000 films from 193 major VR video producers. As of 2021, SexLikeReal also features a VR cam girl section, where you are able to watch live cam girls in VR.

The app is compatible with Oculus Quest, Valve Index, HP Reverb G2, Windows MR, Oculus Go, HTC Vive, and Gear VR, and especially Oculus Rift. The PS4 Pro and PlayStation Pro are not capable of streaming high-quality VR videos on SexLikeReal.

SexLikeReal is popular in many countries and regions, including not only North America and Europe, but also Japan and other Asian countries.

== Technology ==
The SexLikeReal app is a one-click VR video playback player that automatically provides the setup for each headset.

The Virtual reality porn app features the approach to the SexLikeReal porn library on any VR headset and access to developing full dive technology. SexLikeReal app works with Oculus Quest and Quest 2, Rift, Valve Index, Windows Mixed Reality, HTC Vive.

Alex Novak mentioned that a cheap VR headset gave you only 20 percent of VR porn's potential.

In a study conducted by SexLikeReal, the company found that recent video game sales, reported by Steam, showed the VR industry on average drew in total $50 million in title sales alone.

Passthrough technology uses the AR function of a VR headset to make it feel like the performer is in the room.

SexLikeReal created a method of censoring required areas that can be used for all types of JAV and VR porn.

== Interactives ==
SexLikeReal App is supported by several sex toys like TheHandy, Fleshlight Launch, Kiiroo Keon and Onyx+ interactive sex toys. Synchronized scripts make it work with a single click in the SexLikeReal app, and the DeoVR player helps to match every movement that the user sees.

- TheHandy interactive sex toy (no proxy app or extra phone required, it works directly from the SexLikeReal app and DeoVR player)
- Fleshlight Launch, Kiiroo Keon and Onyx+ (install SexLikeReal Interactive on your Android phone)
- SLR Scripts Creators allows users to create scripts with interactive toys and SexLikeReal VR functionality, upload them and earn money when SLR Scripts is used by other users

== Reviews ==
Forbes described SexLikeReal as “a top name in adult VR due to its continued efforts to provide broad content offerings, which can be accessed by every major headset on the market via the SLR app.”

The Daily Star has also given detailed coverage of SexLikeReal's progress in the world of haptic technology and VR material.

== Awards ==
- In 2021, SexLikeReal was among the Best VR porn websites according to Сhicagoreader
- In 2021, GFY Awards announced SexLikeReal as Best VR Affiliate Program
- Xbiz 2023 Best Virtual Reality Site of the Year
- AVN 2023 Best VR scene 2023
- Xbiz 2022 - Best Virtual Reality Sex Scene

== See also ==
- VirtualRealPorn
- BaDoinkVR
