= Friedrichshof Commune =

Austrian far-left commune, 1972–1990

Aktionsanalytische Organisation
- Abbreviation: AAO
- Formation: 1972
- Founder: Otto Muehl
- Dissolved: 1990
- Type: Far-left commune
- Headquarters: Friedrichshof
- Location: Austria

The Aktionsanalytische Organisation (AAO), commonly known as the Friedrichshof Commune, was an Austrian far-left commune in Friedrichshof outside Vienna. The organization was founded in 1972 by artist Otto Muehl and dissolved in 1990. AAO became an authoritarian sect, described as a "psycho sect" by authors Nordhausen and Billerbeck. AAO was devoted to a breakdown of established social habits and beliefs, partly inspired by ideas of Wilhelm Reich.

Muehl was subsequently convicted of widespread sexual abuse of minors who lived in the commune and sentenced to 7 years in prison.

A collection of Viennese Actionist art assembled by the commune later formed the core of the Wiener Aktionismus Museum, which opened in Vienna in 2024.

== Literature ==
- Die Diktatur der `freien Sexualität´ Book with an extensive description, written by the former member Andreas Schlothauer, who played a leading role during the dissolution of the organization.
