= Double penetration =

Both anal and vaginal penetration at the same time

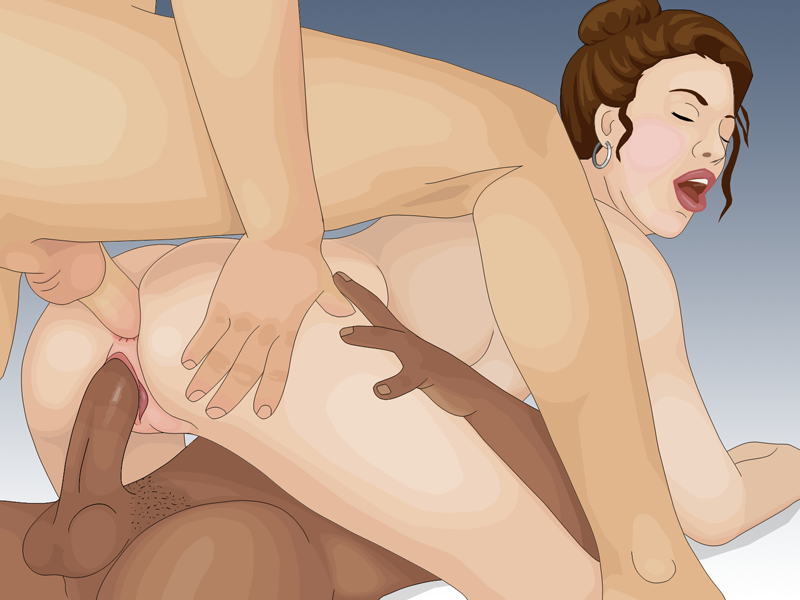
An example of a common pose for double penetration

Double penetration (sometimes called DP for short) is a term that usually refers to a vaginal and anal sex act involving one penis penetrating a vagina while another penetrates the anus. It also refers to the simultaneous penetration of either a vagina or an anus by two penises or objects.

== Practice ==
Double penetration usually involves the insertion and thrusting of two erect penises into a woman's vagina and anus simultaneously. It is a common type of practice in pornography. The term can also describe the insertion and thrusting of two erect penises into a single vagina or anus. This is known as double vaginal penetration (DVP) and double anal penetration (DAP) respectively.

Double penetration can be carried out not only with penises, but also with different parts of the body (hands, fingers) or with specific sex toys.

The sexual act may be pleasurable for the female penetrated partner due to the "blended orgasms" from the stimulation of either or both the G-spot and the A-spot (anterior fornix) in the vagina with the anal nerve endings and the PS-spot (perineal sponge), which is situated inside the wall separating the anal and vaginal canals. The penetrating partners may derive pleasure from the tightness of the vagina and/or anus, as well as from their penises rubbing together either in the same orifice or through the lining of the rectovaginal fascia.

== History ==
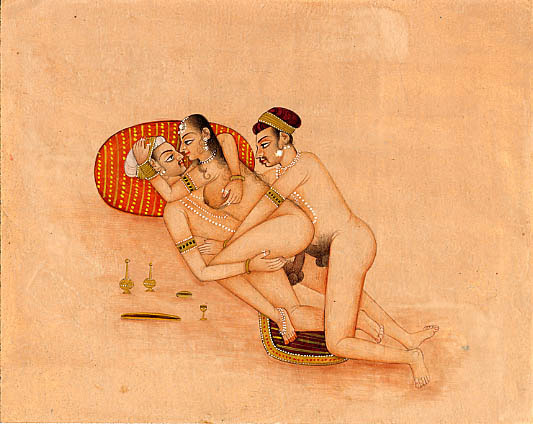
Illustration of a woman being double penetrated in the 3rd century CE text Kama Sutra.

Representations of double penetration have been depicted in many Roman erotic objects, as well as in the Kama Sutra. The first filmed double penetration in history appeared in 1970, in the movie "Delphia the Greek", by director Lasse Braun.

The feminist Bernadette Barton has argued that double penetration, because it usually involves two men's penises close together or directly touching, is an "unusually homoerotic" act in an otherwise homophobic culture. Barton also thinks double penetration is "bizarre" and "body punishing" because it can stretch a woman's orifices to their physical limit. Pornographic actor James Deen denies that double penetration is inherently "homosexual activity", even if two penises are in the same orifice, believing that the motivation of the male performer determines whether the act is homosexual or not. Bisexual author Zachary Zane writes that double penetration is not inherently bisexual, but may become bisexual if the men choose to interact sexually, saying that queer men doubly penetrating a woman may be a "completely different experience" than straight men doing so.

== Spit-roast ==
The spit-roast is a variation of double penetration, whereby a person is penetrated from behind by one penis (either in the vagina or anus) and performs oral sex on another penis. This sexual act combines both the doggy style position with fellatio; the "spit-roast" is frequently depicted within pornography.

== See also ==
- Bisexual pornography
- Group sex
- Threesome
