= Double penetration dildo =

Dildo that can be inserted on either end

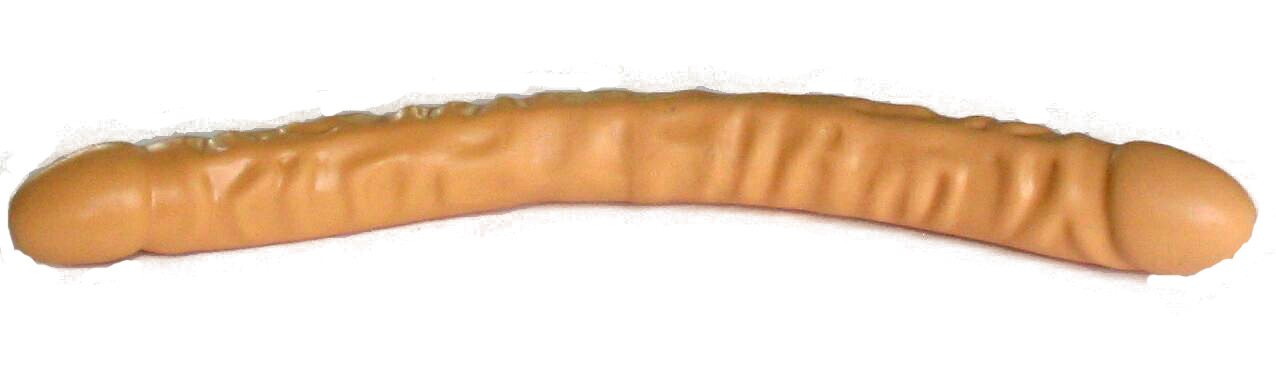
A 59-inch latex double dildo

A double penetration dildo or double dildo is a type of sex toy used for double penetration, the simultaneous entry of two body orifices at the same time, belonging to either one or two people. It is a dildo designed in the form of two penetrative stimulators (either penis-shaped or non-phallic) that are either separate or fixed on a single shaft. Some double penetration dildos include a vibrating motor that allows them to be used as double penetration vibrators.

== Use ==
The following four sexual configurations can be performed using double penetration dildos:

- Vagina-to-vagina. Some people use double-ended dildos as part of their sex play with another person. The double-ended nature of the dildo allows penetration in two vaginas simultaneously.
- Vagina-to-anus. The majority of double-penetration dildos are designed for simultaneous stimulation of anal and vaginal erogenous zones, but in the case of elongated "double-headed" devices it is possible for two partners to use the same device simultaneously. This can also be used for pegging, when a person with a vagina (or other sexual organs) penetrates the anus of another person.
- Anus-to-anus. Most double-ended dildos can be used for anal penetration of both partners.
- Vaginal-and-anus. Vaginal and anal stimulation on one person.

Simulated oral sex can also be performed on the dildo.

== Classification ==
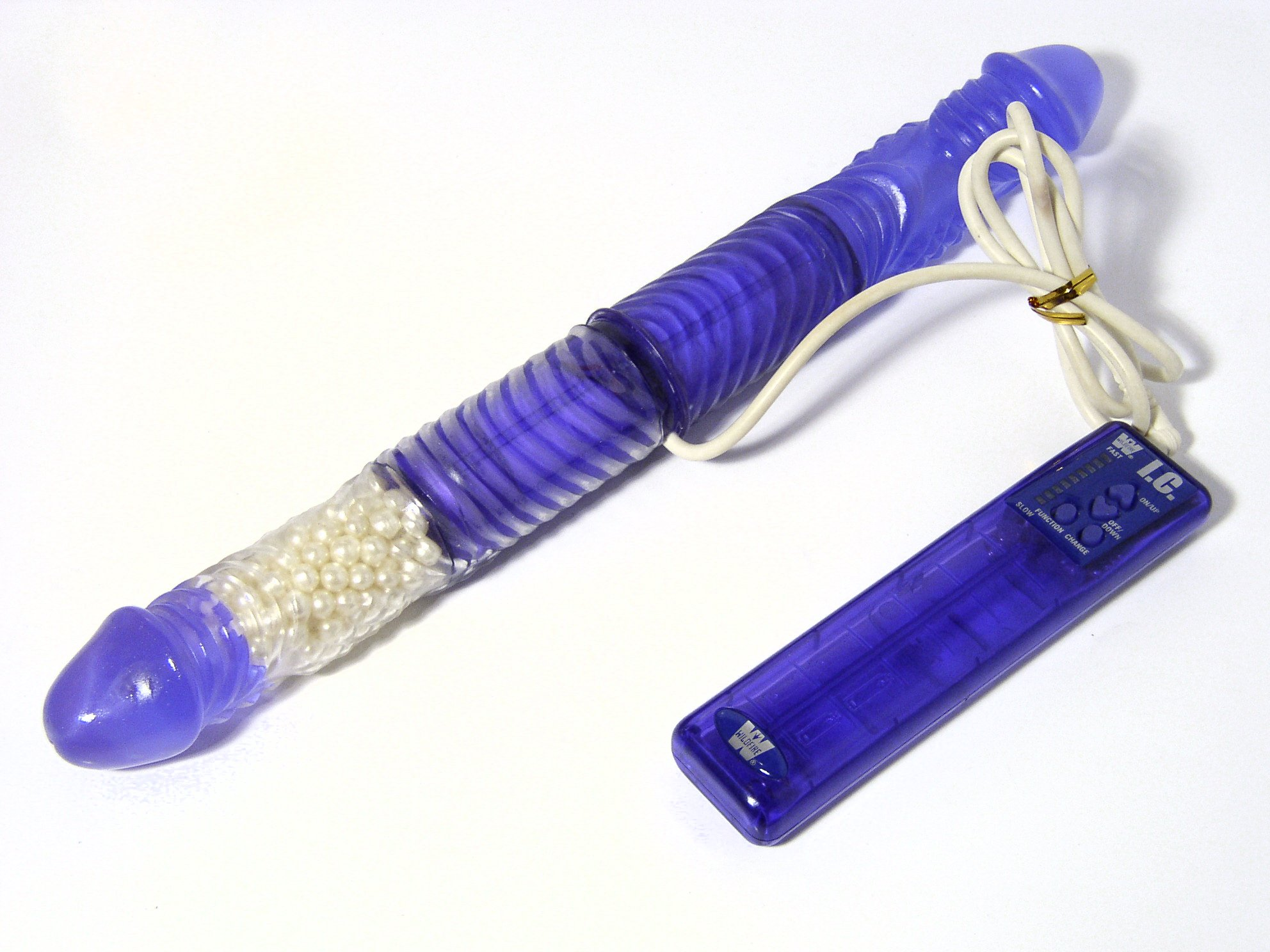
Double dildo with remote-controlled rotating vibrator on one side

- Double-ended dildo also known as a DED, or double-sided dildo. These are associated with lesbian sexual practices, but double-ended dildos are also used by heterosexual women for simultaneous anal and vaginal penetration. This dildo is usually made out of the soft flexible material (such as plastic or some form of rubber) that allows the shape of the shaft to change as the user wishes: to bend in a C-shape or to remain straight. Historically they were often made of wood: Haberlandt (1899), for example, illustrates a straight double-ended dildo of this kind from late 19th century Zanzibar.
- Anal and vaginal stimulators on the single shaft. These types of dildo or vibrator are intended for stimulating the user anally and vaginally. One shaft of the smaller length and width is attached to the other and they are both inserted, stimulating the anal and vaginal erogenous zones of a woman. If this is a vibrating sex toy there can be two motors, one in each shaft, controlled together or separately. Some modern versions incorporate app-linked control features; manufacturers such as Lovense have produced examples of these, which function similarly to other dual-shaft vibrators intended for internal and external stimulation.
- Kits made up of two separate vibrators or dildos. This is a kit of vibrators or dildos that are not directly connected with each other or are connected by a wire attached to a single controller. They can be used simultaneously or independently to stimulate the erogenous zones of both partners, or they can be used without a partner.
- Double-ended/sided hands- and strap-free dildos. A strapless variant on the strap-on dildo, this type is held by an egg shaped bulb inserted into the vagina or anus of the wearer.

== Materials ==
- Jelly rubber ("jelly"). This is a popular sex toy material due to how cheap it is to produce. It features a variety of colors, though the material tends to suffer discoloration and physical deterioration over time. It contains chemicals called phthalates, which are thought to be harmful to gynecological and reproductive health. Unlike silicone (below) this material is porous, meaning that it can harbor bacteria.
- Silicone. Dildos and vibrators made of this material are durable and are non-porous, so they are easy to clean and maintain.
- Rubber. Many realistic dildos are made of rubber—a material that is both pliable and flexible enough for effective penetration. Like jelly, rubber is also porous.
- Glass. Glass double-ended dildos are usually created with special designs. Glass is a smooth and firm material that delivers a cool feeling when used. It can also be used chilled and warmed for different feeling. Usually glass dildos are made of borosilicate glass, of which Pyrex, Schott-Duranglas and Simax are the most suitable.
- Plastic. This non-porous and phthalate-free material is often used for creating double-ended dildos.

== See also ==
- Anal vibrator
- Clitoral pump
- G-spot vibrator
- Love egg
- Rabbit vibrator
- Strap-on dildo

== Notes ==
- Haberlandt, M. (1899). "Conträre Sexual-Erscheinungen bei der Neger-Bevölkerung Zanzibars", Zeitschrift für Ethnologie, 31: 668–670.
