= Clitoral vibrator =

Sex toy

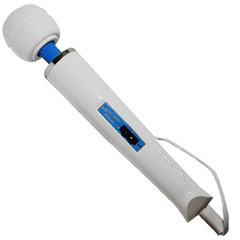
Electronic vibrator

Clitoral vibrators are vibrators designed to externally stimulate the clitoris for sexual pleasure and orgasm. They are sex toys created for massaging the clitoris and are not typically used as penetrating sex toys. Although mainly used for clitoral stimulation, the shape of some vibrators allows for penetration and the stimulation of inner erogenous zones for extra sexual pleasure.

== Use ==
Regardless of the design, the main function of the clitoral vibrator is to vibrate at varying speeds and intensities. Vibrators are normally driven by batteries and some of them can be used underwater. Discretion is often a useful feature for a sex toy, so clitoral vibrators that look like ordinary objects at first glance are also available. Clitoral vibrators have been designed to resemble lipsticks, mobile telephones, sponges, and many other everyday items.

The International Society for the Study of Women's Sexual Health (ISSWSH) writes that clitoral vibrators can be a nonhormonal and nonpharmacological treatment of female genital arousal disorder.

== Types ==
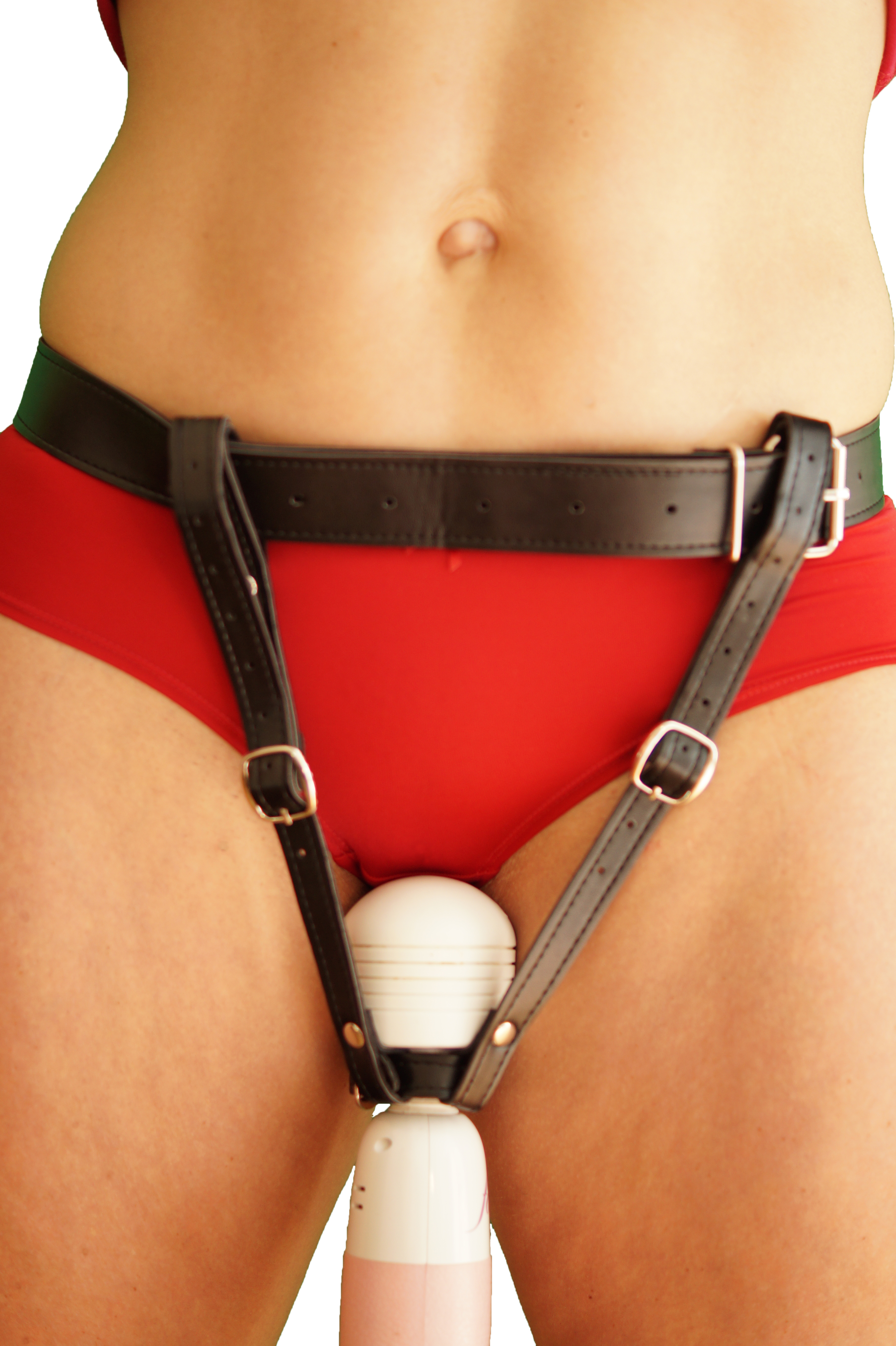
A wand vibrator belt for hands-free use

Most vibrators can be used for clitoral stimulation, but there are a few distinct types of vibrators available:

- Manual clitoral vibrators come in a wide variety of designs. Some wand vibrators (such as the Hitachi Magic Wand and the Doxy) are powered by a long cable to a wall socket, making them somewhat less convenient, and unsafe in a wet environment. However, they are generally powerful, offering more intense stimulation and better durability. There are also battery-operated vibrators, as well as small ones that can be worn on a finger.
- Hands-free clitoral vibrators have evolved from basic egg-shaped designs into more ergonomic and versatile styles. Many modern versions are compact, wearable, and designed to fit snugly against the body without straps or harnesses. They may be operated via wireless remote or mobile apps, offering multiple vibration modes and customizable intensity levels.
- Butterfly strap-ons are small, hands-free vibrators with adjustable straps on the wearer's waist and hips.
- Wearable vibrators are a broader category that includes devices designed to be worn internally, externally, or incorporated into underwear. These devices are often used for public or partnered stimulation, with remote-controlled or app-controlled features enabling hands-free operation. They are usually discreet, rechargeable, and designed for extended wear during everyday activities.
- Vibrating panties are panties with an extra pouch in front into which a small vibrator is placed. They are usually remote-controlled, such as via an app on a mobile device, and can be worn outside of the home, such as in an office, car, etc. The remote control can be entrusted to the wearer's partner, but its range is limited, and the vibrator can also be remotely controlled via an app installed on both mobile devices. In recent years, some devices have used internet-based connectivity to allow long-distance operation, with companies such as Lovense among those producing devices that support synchronization with music, sound activation, and customizable vibration patterns. However, these vibrators are not silent, producing an audible humming sound when active.
- Vibrating cock rings feature a vibrating bullet, to stimulate the clitoris during intercourse, as well as an erection enhancer.

There are also dual types of vibrators which provide stimulation to both the clitoris and G-spot. Some clitoral vibrators may be inserted into the vagina. These typically have a small arm near the base of the vibrator, providing simultaneous clitoral and vaginal stimulation. Variations include vibrators shaped like narrow bullets, animals, ergonomic forms, miniature rockets and large human tongues.

== See also ==
- Anal vibrator
- G-spot vibrator
- Love egg
- Rabbit vibrator
- Waterproof vibrator
