= Anal vibrator =

Electric-powered anal sex toy

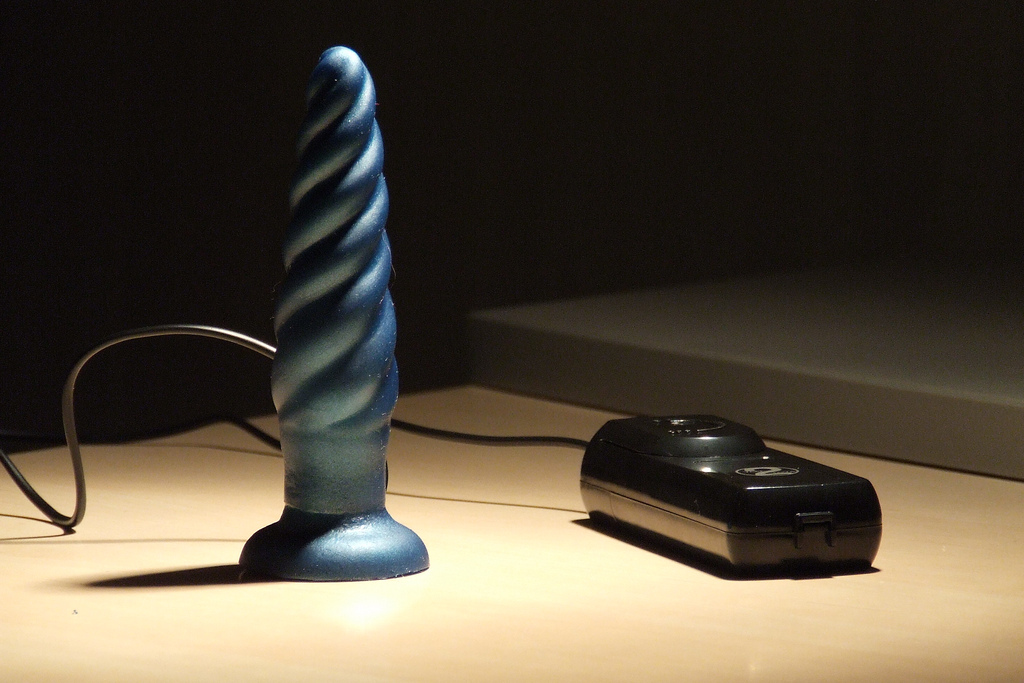
Unisex Superslim Buttplug - Flickr - stnu.

An anal vibrator is a vibrator designed for sexual stimulation of the anus of both men and women. All anal vibrators have one common feature: they produce a vibrating effect in the rectum for pleasurable sensations.

Anal vibrators differ from other types of vibrators in that they have a flared base to prevent possible loss in the rectum. The average size of an anal vibrator is smaller than vibrators intended for vaginal penetration and may vary from 4-6 inches long and about 1 inch wide. As well as other vibrators designed for external and internal stimulation, anal vibrators are usually battery-operated: the batteries may be inside the unit or connected by wire to a power pack.

Unlike anal dildos, such as butt plugs, anal probes and anal beads, vibrating anal toys may produce various stimulating effects: rotating, vibrating or pulsating, and can have different speeds or vibration levels to regulate and adjust the vibrator to various sensations. Some companies like Lovense also produce app-controlled anal vibrators that can be controlled remotely using a smartphone application.

== Types of anal vibrators ==
- Vibrating anal probes

Anal probes, with vibrating effect, are smaller than usual butt plugs–about the size of a finger, which makes them a very helpful anal toy for beginners. Anal probe vibrators may be narrower because their main function is to slide and vibrate.

- Vibrating butt plugs

Vibrating butt plugs are made to stay inside the anus to create fullness and vibrating stimulation at the same time. Their advantage is that they can be simply left in for anal stimulation during solo or partner's sex to receive multiple enhancements.

- Vibrating anal beads and balls

Vibrating beads and balls are a number of small beads or balls joined together through a long, retrievable cord to a power control. They may not only be inserted and pulled out, but also vibrate at different speeds.

- P-spot vibrators

P-spot vibrators are made in such a shape with curved heads that these facilitate the stimulation of the prostate.

== Features ==
Anal vibrator shapes can vary depending on the brand and the buyer's preference. Among the most common ones you can buy if they are phallic shaped (similar to a dildo), elongated or curved shape. length rarely exceeds 15 centimetres with a diameter of no more than 11 centimetres. They usually have an internal motor with a matching battery, a Bluetooth interface to control the device with a smartphone or special remote control, and a charging plug.

They can usually generate different types of vibration, and in products marketed primarily for prostate stimulation, the internal motors may be individually controlled or the shape may be articulated.

Materials vary by brand, but among the most commonly used are silicon to facilitate disinfection (using sodium hypochlorite, alcohol).

== Dangers ==
If they are not used properly, especially if they are very small or not optimized for proper use, they can present a problem of medical and surgical interest because, once lost in the rectum, self-extraction is unlikely to be possible.

== Other uses ==
Some clinical and academic studies have shown that the use of vibration-induced prostate stimulation can help in the sexual rehabilitation of patients who have survived forms of prostate cancer.

== See also ==
- Clitoral pump
- Clitoral vibrator
- Double penetration dildo
- G-spot vibrator
- Love egg
- Rabbit vibrator
- Strap-on dildo
