= Hitachi Magic Wand =

Brand of wand vibrator

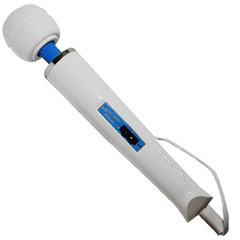
- Hitachi Magic Wand (HV-250R)
- Other names: Magic Wand; Magic Wand Original; Original Magic Wand; The Hitachi
- Type: Electric, wall-powered vibrating massager
- Company: Hitachi
- Country: Japan
- Availability: 25 April 1968–present
- Slogan: Powerful, penetrating vibrations

The Magic Wand (formerly known as the Hitachi Magic Wand (Note: Also known as the True Magic Wand, Magic Wand Original, Vibratex Magic Wand, and Original Magic Wand.)) is an AC-powered wand vibrator. It was originally manufactured for relieving tension and relaxing sore muscles; however, it is most known for its use as a sex toy. Japanese company Hitachi listed the device for business in the United States in 1968. Sex educator Betty Dodson popularized its use as a vibrator and masturbation aid for women during the sex-positive movement in the late 1960s. It functions effectively as a clitoral vibrator for reaching orgasm. The wand is 12 inches (30 cm) long and weighs 1.2 pounds (540 g) with stimulation provided by its rubberized 2.5-inch (64 mm) head.

Hitachi asserts that its sole intended use is for health care purposes. Hitachi's national sales manager said "we approach the massagers as personal care items... the people we hire know what it's for without our having to say it". Hitachi had a conflict with its U.S. distributor in 2000 and briefly stopped selling the device, until it reached a new deal with distributor Vibratex. The Magic Wand was featured in a 2002 episode of Sex and the City. Hitachi ceased production of the device in 2013 due to concerns about having the company name associated with a sex toy. Vibratex convinced the company to continue manufacturing it under the name "Original Magic Wand", omitting the Hitachi name. In 2014, the company used the name "Magic Wand Original".

Academics have researched its use for treatment of female sexual arousal disorder and chronic anorgasmia—a sexual dysfunction in which a person cannot achieve orgasm. The Journal of Consulting and Clinical Psychology published a 1979 study which found self-administered treatment and use of the Magic Wand to be the best method to achieve orgasm. In 2008, The Scientific World Journal published research finding over 93% of a group of 500 chronic anorgasmic women could reach orgasm using the Magic Wand and the Betty Dodson Method. The device was used in studies in many applications, including articles published in Dermatology Online Journal, Journal of Applied Physiology, Experimental Brain Research, Neuroscience Letters, and Journal of Perinatal & Neonatal Nursing.

The Magic Wand has alternatively been referred to as the Cadillac or Rolls-Royce of vibrators, as well as the mother of all vibrators. Counselors Bettina Arndt, Laura Berman, Gloria Brame, and Ruth Westheimer (Dr. Ruth) recommended the device to women, and Cosmopolitan magazine reported the Magic Wand was the vibrator most often suggested by sex therapists. Mobile Magazine readers in 2005 voted the Magic Wand "the No. 1 greatest gadget of all time". Tanya Wexler's film Hysteria featured the device while showing the evolution of the vibrator. Engadget called the Magic Wand "the most recognizable sex toy on Earth".

== Design and features ==
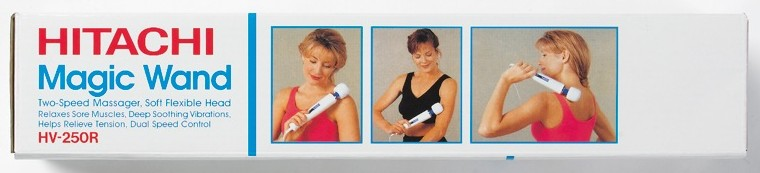
Hitachi listed the Magic Wand for business use with the United States Patent and Trademark Office on 25 April 1968.

The device is 30 cm (12 in) long and it weighs 540 g (1.19 lb). Muscle and nerve stimulation is provided by the device's rubberised, 6.4 cm (2.5 in) head, which is attached to the main body of the massager via a flexible neck. A 1.8 m (6 ft) cord is attached to the device to provide power from mains electricity with alternating current, and requires 120 volts. It does not take batteries. The massager provides two vibration rates—nominally 5,000 and 6,000 rpm, equivalent to 83 Hz and 100 Hz—that are controlled by a switch on its body. Research published in the journal Sexual and Relationship Therapy reported that the Magic Wand operated at frequencies of 89 Hz and 101 Hz. Its displacement was measured as 0.45 mm (0.018 in), with a maximum acceleration of 0.1857 g (1.821 m/s^{2}). The device was not originally designed as a sexual stimulation aid, and it has some deficiencies when used for this purpose. Apart from its size, bulk, and its reliance on a mains power supply that limits its portability, it is not waterproof or water-resistant, and it overheats when used for more than 25 minutes. It does not work well in electrical outlets in all countries internationally.

Because of the Magic Wand's popularity, various aftermarket attachments with differences in colour, pattern of studs, and material, became available to purchase. Such attachments have been produced by many companies without ties to Hitachi. Without attachments, the device functions effectively as a clitoral vibrator, able to bring women to orgasm. Add-ons that are fitted over the top of the device and are used to excite the clitoris are available. An attachment called the Wonder Wand allows women to feel vibrations deep into the vagina. According to an article in the Dermatology Online Journal, The Wonder Wand is created from a plastic material which is even in consistency and is simple to clean after use. Attachments made of silicone designed to aid with penetrative sensations or to modify texture of the device are available. An add-on called the G-Spotter fits over the device in the same fashion and turns the device into a G-spot vibrator. The Gee Whiz (also referred to as G-Whiz) is a similar type of attachment used to stimulate the G-spot. The Flutter Tip Wand Attachment may be placed over the device and can be used to mimic the sensation of cunnilingus. Liberator Axis is a booster pillow that stabilizes the Magic Wand so the user does not have to hold it with their hands during use. Attachments have been sold by Betty Dodson on her website, which provides pictorial instructions on their use with the Magic Wand. For penile stimulation the massager can be applied directly; for prostate stimulation, it can be applied externally to the perineum or, with attachments such as the Gee Whiz, used for internal prostate stimulation. Another attachment made by an unaffiliated company is a sleeve for penile stimulation.

== History ==
=== Debut as massager ===
Hitachi listed the Magic Wand for business use with the United States Patent and Trademark Office on 25 April 1968. Hitachi Ltd. registered the trademark to the Magic Wand. It became available to the mass market in the U.S. during the 1970s and was advertised as a device to aid with massage techniques. It is effective at relieving pain associated with back aches, and is registered with the Food and Drug Administration as a physical medicine device under the classification therapeutic electric massager. The stated use of the Magic Wand is the soothing and relaxing of sore muscles and nerves, relieving tension, and rehabilitation after sports injuries.

=== Women's masturbation education ===
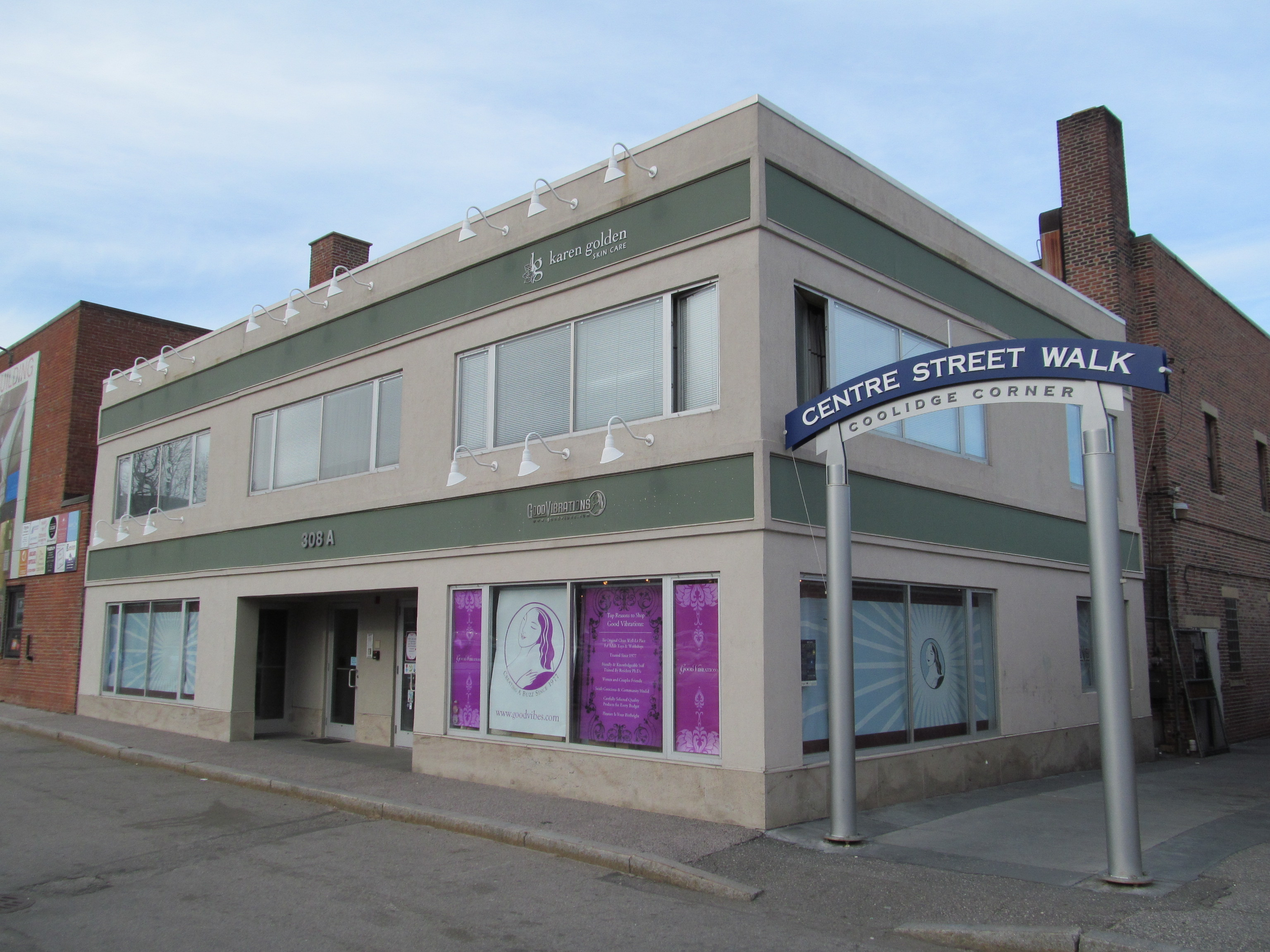
The Magic Wand has been an enduring success at the sex shop Good Vibrations since the store's opening in 1977.

The Magic Wand has found great commercial success as a vibrator, a masturbation aid for women. Its popularity for this purpose is associated with the American artist and sex educator Betty Dodson, who used it in demonstrations and instructional classes to instruct women regarding self-pleasure techniques. Dodson became active in the sex-positive movement in the late 1960s. She recommended women put a small towel over their sex organs in order to dull the sensation of the vibrator and prolong the pleasurable experience. Her technique became known as the Betty Dodson Method. Her sessions were known as Bodysex workshops and featured 15 naked women in supine position, each using a Magic Wand simultaneously to aid in masturbation. She provided a Magic Wand to each woman for these two-hour masturbation sessions. Dodson taught thousands of women to achieve orgasm using this technique.

Dell Williams, founder of the first feminist sex toy business in the United States, Eve's Garden, was inspired to launch her store after using a Magic Wand as a student in Dodson's course in the early 1970s. Williams said the Magic Wand was her favorite sex toy because of its dependability and its power at delivering pleasure to the clitoris. In 1974, Dodson recommended the device in her book Liberating Masturbation. In 1975 in her demonstrations, she replaced the Panasonic Panabrator with the Magic Wand. In 1977, Dodson recommended the device to Dian Hanson, former editor of men's magazines Leg Show and Juggs. Hanson recalled her initial experience after receiving the recommendation from Dodson. Hanson said she was instructed to purchase the Magic Wand but was advised to be cautious regarding its emotional and physical influence because it could have properties which could cause habit-forming dependency. She observed that in comparison to her prior vibrator operated by two D batteries, the Magic Wand was significantly more effective.

The Magic Wand has been a bestseller at the sex shop Good Vibrations since it opened in 1977. The shop marketed the magic wand to women as an effective means of stimulating the clitoris. The device became an enduring bestseller in adult sex toy shops in the United States. It has become known colloquially among women as "Big Buzzy", and is also simply referred to as "The Hitachi". During the 1980s, the device was advertised in the back pages of Mother Jones magazine. It became popular with women and was featured on the cover of the book Good Vibrations: The New Complete Guide to Vibrators (1976) by Joani Blank. The Magic Wand features on the covers of the 1989 and 1998 editions of the book. In 1992 for the 15th anniversary of the opening of Good Vibrations, the sex store managers arranged to have chocolates manufactured in the shape of the Magic Wand. Sales staff from the corporate headquarters of Hitachi company contributed finances towards the creation of the chocolates in the shape of their massager. The Hitachi executives additionally purchased 500 of the massager-shaped chocolates which were given out at the company's sales conference that year.

Good Vibes Gazette surveyed sex toy store customers in 1995 and asked them to rank their opinions of sex toys. The Magic Wand was identified as outstanding. The 1995 book about censorship Forbidden Passages: Writings Banned in Canada, which included works confiscated by Canadian authorities for being "obscene", featured a contribution involving a woman who used a Magic Wand for pain relief. In 1997, the Magic Wand was the most popular holiday gift item sold at the Good Vibrations store in Berkeley, California. According to Out magazine, the Magic Wand was the best-selling sex toy of 1998. Chatelaine received criticism from the Alberta Report in 1999 for reporting on the increasing popularity of the Magic Wand and other sex toys among women. In 1999 the Magic Wand was promoted to consumers as a "personal massager" device. The Village Voice reported in 1999 that the device was marketed by the company as the "Hitachi Magic Wand Household Electric Massager". According to the article in The Village Voice, the device had outlived competition from subsequent inventions by other companies and remained a bestseller. When contacted in 1999 by The Village Voice the public relations director of Hitachi, Gerry Corbett, emphasized the original intent of their product: "Clearly, [the Magic Wand] is a straightforward product. There are no implications of anything beyond standard health-care use."

=== Vibratex distribution ===
"Clearly, [the Magic Wand] is a straightforward product. There are no implications of anything beyond standard health-care use."

— Hitachi public relations director (1999)

In 2000, Hitachi came into conflict with Appliance Corporation of America, the American distributor of its products including the Magic Wand. It briefly ceased being sold in the United States. In June 2000, Hitachi reached a deal with the sex toy distribution company Vibratex to sell the device in the U.S. Updated Vibratex versions, such as the rechargeable battery HV-270, continued to be available in 2024. Urologist and sexual dysfunction specialist Jed Kaminetsky told The New York Observer in 2000 that the Magic Wand had a renowned reputation. He stated he recommended the device to female patients with difficulty achieving orgasm to use in masturbation. Kaminetsky observed that the Magic Wand provided an extremely successful mode of masturbation and was among the pre-eminent vibrators available.

The concept of using a neck massager for other than its stated purpose was popularized in 2002 in an episode of the television series Sex and the City, "Critical Condition". The character Samantha Jones goes to Sharper Image to buy a vibrator, but the staff at the store tell her it is a neck massager. Shortly after the episode aired, the Magic Wand sold out of stores. Journalist Naomi Wolf wrote in The Sunday Times that while researching an article on the female-oriented sex toys catalogue Good Vibrations, she was informed that the Magic Wand had sold out from their stock because of its appearance on Sex and the City. The Rabbit vibrator had previously seen an increase in sales, after it was similarly popularized on the program in 1998. According to a contribution to Best Sex Writing 2013 by Andy Isaacson, these appearances of sex toys on Sex and the City revolutionized the way they were perceived culturally in the United States. The Times noted the Magic Wand was relatively new to the market in the United Kingdom, where it became available in 2004. The Magic Wand was number seven of the top ten hand-held massagers sold on Amazon.com. Faye Flam writing for Knight Ridder Newspapers reported in 2006 that the Magic Wand was exempt from anti-vibrator laws in Alabama, Georgia, and Texas because it did not appear to be a phallic object. In 2006 the device was among the top-selling masturbation aids in the market.

The closing credits of director Tanya Wexler's 2011 film Hysteria featured the Magic Wand in a montage showing the evolution of the vibrator. In August 2012, American filmmaker Clayton Cubitt used the Magic Wand in a video-art exhibit titled Hysterical Literature. The film project featured women sitting on a chair narrating a piece of literature while being stimulated by the Magic Wand. Each video ends with the woman's orgasm. Writing for The McClatchy Company, Chuck Shepherd called it "Great Art!".

=== Rebranding ===
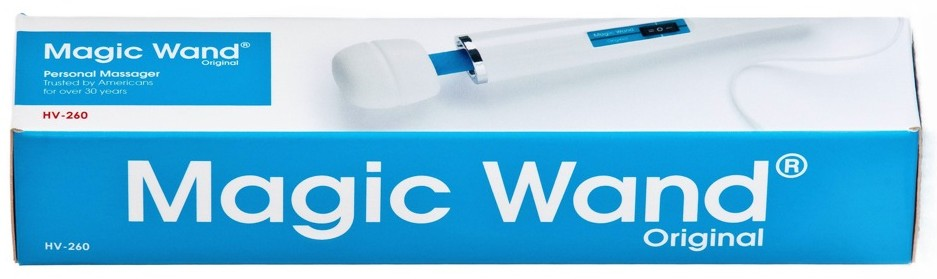
The device was rebranded as "Magic Wand Original" after Hitachi dropped its name from marketing in 2013.

Because of its concerns about having its notable technology brand name attached to a popular sex toy, Hitachi decided to cease production of the Magic Wand in 2013. Vibratex director of operations Eddie Romero told Engadget that Hitachi is an extremely staid company and was uncomfortable being associated with the best-selling masturbation aid. Vibratex persuaded Hitachi to continue manufacturing the device, to rename it the "Original Magic Wand", to use lighter, more durable materials, and to omit any reference to Hitachi. The newly named device returned to the market on 25 June 2013, with improved engineering and modified graphic design on its accompanying box. It was sold as the "Original Magic Wand Vibrator" by Good Vibrations.

In January 2014 the device's name was "Magic Wand Original" according to Shape Magazine, with information provided at the associated website magicwandoriginal.com. Hitachi did not market the device for sexual purposes until recently, as of October 2016, but still only referring to one of its uses as an "intimate" massager. Betty Dodson told Engadget in 2014 that the device was still her preferred vibrator. On 5 May 2014, the device was featured in a comedy segment of the television program Louie on FX. In 2014, 250,000 Magic Wands were sold in the U.S. by Vibratex. In November 2014, Stanford School of Medicine assistant professor of obstetrics and gynecology Leah Millheiser recommended the Magic Wand. She commented to Yahoo! Health that it was effective for helping women with orgasm after menopause, and improving sexual ability and self-esteem.

=== Expansions ===
In 2015, the Magic Wand Rechargeable, a rechargeable battery-powered version, was released. It has four speeds, the highest of which is 105 Hz (6,300 rpm), which is a higher frequency than the original's 100 Hz (6,000 rpm), as well as four vibration patterns, and a smooth silicone head. The vibration intensity and the patterned vibrations are controlled by two separate rectangular buttons. It has been widely praised since its debut. In 2019, the Magic Wand Plus was released, which, like the original, must be plugged in, but has the same vibration power levels as the rechargeable. The button layout is slightly different, with separate buttons to increase and decrease the power level, rather than cycling through all with a single button. In 2022, the Magic Wand Mini was released, with three power levels up to 100 Hz (6,000 rpm), the same button layout as the Plus, and a much more compact size. In 2023, Vibratex introduced the Magic Wand Micro, a four-inch (100 mm) wand with three intensity settings and four patterns featuring vibrations up to 105 Hz (6,300 rpm). The internal design of the Magic Wand Micro can be seen on the website for the device.

== Academic research ==
=== Sexual uses ===
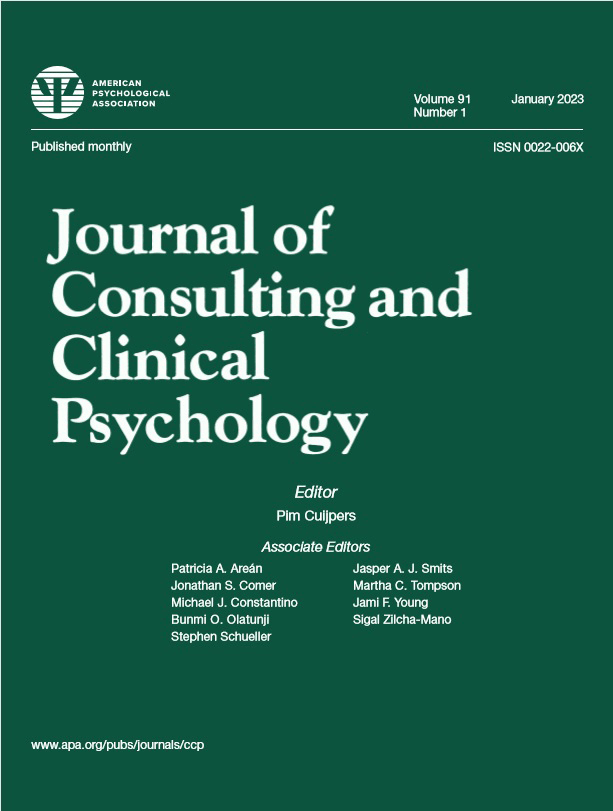
The Journal of Consulting and Clinical Psychology published an early study using the Magic Wand during treatment to help women reach orgasm.

Many academics have discussed use of the Magic Wand to treat chronic anorgasmia—a type of sexual dysfunction in which a person cannot achieve orgasm—and other sexual problems including female sexual arousal disorder. A study published in 1979 in the Journal of Consulting and Clinical Psychology analyzed the training of women in self-masturbation techniques in a sample of individuals who previously had difficulty experiencing orgasm. The researchers gave women the Magic Wand to help excite the clitoris and increase the likelihood they would experience an orgasm. They found self-administered treatment using the Magic Wand to be the most efficient option to address prior problems achieving orgasm.

The Scientific World Journal published research finding more than 93% of a group of 500 chronically anorgasmic women could reach orgasm using the Magic Wand and the Betty Dodson Method.

In 2008 The Scientific World Journal published research in which women with long-term problems achieving orgasm were instructed using documentation from Betty Dodson. They said the Magic Wand's large head effectively created a vibrating sensation in the area of the clitoris and vulva without superficial discomfort. Their research showed that more than 93% of a group of 500 chronically anorgasmic women could reach orgasm using Magic Wand and the Betty Dodson Method. The Scientific World Journal research was subsequently discussed in a literature review published in 2010 by The Journal of Sexual Medicine. Bat Sheva Marcus published a 2011 article in The Journal of Sexual Medicine after introducing women to the Magic Wand as a way to increase her subjects' levels of sexual experience and assess changes in their sexual expectations.

In their work Pleasure Able: Sexual Device Manual for Persons with Disabilities, authors Kate Naphtali and Edith MacHattie of the Disabilities Health Research Network under the supervision of doctors Andrei Krassioukov and Stacy L Elliott recommended use of the Magic Wand in sexual activity for people with disabilities. The authors said the person holding the device would need to be capable of maintaining an active wide grasp throughout the process. They wrote that the Magic Wand was helpful for disabled people with either limited strength in their upper extremities or limited use of their hands. They also said it was well-suited for individuals with decreased movement in their upper extremities.

In a 2011 paper for the Conference on Human Factors in Computing Systems, authors Anna Eaglin and Shaowen Bardzell discussed the Magic Wand within the context of devices used in sexual behavior that were not originally created for that purpose. A 2012 study published in the journal Sexual and Relationship Therapy evaluated seven vibrators for use with clinical therapy for sexual stimulation. They found that the Magic Wand displayed a high degree of movement and oscillation. The researchers suggested that their data could be used by therapists to select the optimum vibrator which could deliver both effectiveness and sensitivity for their clients.

=== Vibration analgesia ===
In their 2002 book Myofascial Pain and Fibromyalgia: Trigger Point Management authors orthopedic surgeon Edward S. Rachlin and physical therapist Isabel Rachlin recommended use of the Magic Wand for self-treatment by patients with myalgia. They wrote that continued use of the Magic Wand on myofascial trigger points or tense areas of muscle could result in decreasing the amount of discomfort felt by patients. Rachlin and Rachlin suggested that such treatment could be done in one's residence outside of a clinical setting.

In a 2004 article published in Dermatology Online Journal, authors reported on use of the Magic Wand to help alleviate pain before cosmetic and dermatologic techniques performed by clinicians. The authors described use of the device to decrease discomfort before procedures including supplementing anesthesia with the injection of triamcinolone acetonide into the proximal nail fold for psoriasis, decreasing discomfort during a Restylane injection of the nasolabial fold, making an intense pulsed light (IPL) facial treatment easier by reducing pain during the procedure, and throughout axillary hyperhidrosis treatment with botulinum toxin. They recommended use of the device with the "Wonder Wand" attachment to provide vibration to a decreased surface area on the patient. Lead researcher Kevin C. Smith explained to Skin & Allergy News that the vibrations when delivered to the area of the patient's mandible can give relief from discomfort by negating feelings of pain from being sent through the sensory system. Smith and Francisco Perez-Atamoros further elaborated on use of the Magic Wand in Chapter 7 "Other Dermatologic Uses of Botulinum Toxin" of the 2006 compilation book Botulinum Toxin in Clinical Dermatology. They emphasized the beneficial uses of the Magic Wand with the "Wonder Wand" attachment and showed how its vibrations can reduce pain if given just before an injection of Restylane within 1 to 2 cm (0.39 to 0.79 in) from the injection site.

Authors Lisa R. Baba, Jacqueline M. McGrath, and Jiexin Liu examined use of vibration delivery to infants to mitigate pain while doing neonatal heel prick procedures in a 2010 article for the Journal of Perinatal & Neonatal Nursing. Their sample size included 20 babies of age 35 weeks or more, and they tracked their subjects' levels of pain on the Neonatal Infant Pain Scale while giving mechanical vibration to alleviate discomfort for a heel stick procedure. Vibration was delivered using the Magic Wand, which they bought through Vibratex. They set the Magic Wand to the highest setting and placed it on the heel of the infant for five seconds before administering the heel stick procedure. Their results found that oscillation sensations delivered to newborns who had previously had discomfort from heel pricks were able to deliver some relief. They wrote that additional research was indicated in the form of a randomized clinical trial with a greater sample size of newborns.

=== Proprioception and vertigo ===
Ely Rabin and Andrew M. Gordon reported in 2004 in the Journal of Applied Physiology on their use of the Magic Wand to create vibrations in the left biceps brachia to study proprioception signals in humans related to fingertip contact on surfaces. Rabin and Gordon followed up their research in 2006 with a subsequent paper published in the journal Experimental Brain Research. They wrote that extension of muscles and sensory clues worked together to provide regional perception of the patient's upper extremity in a localized area. Rabin and Gordon later co-wrote a 2010 paper with additional authors in Neuroscience Letters and expanded on research incorporating use of the Magic Wand to stimulate the biceps brachia. They measured people suffering Parkinson's disease (PD) for proprioceptive ability while their subjects' biceps muscles were stimulated with the vibrator. In 2007, researchers published a paper in the journal Gait & Posture about use of the Magic Wand to help measure balance and postural sway. While testing their subjects' balance while having to deal with simultaneous vibration, the researchers attached one Magic Wand to each leg.

In a 2011 article for the International Journal of Otolaryngology, Jeremy Hornibrook discussed the inner ear disorder benign paroxysmal positional vertigo (BPPV). BPPV is the most common cause of vertigo, a problem attributed to a detached otoconia in one of the semicircular canals. Hornibrook recommended a repositioning treatment for patients with BPPV from the posterior canal location. He wrote that the procedure most often performed for this purpose was a slightly transformed version of the Epley maneuver, and afterwards recommended carrying out a Dix–Hallpike test to assess the status of BPPV. If such a test was positive, Hornibrook recommended using a Magic Wand to deliver vibrations to the area of the mastoid process.

== Reception ==
=== Commentary ===
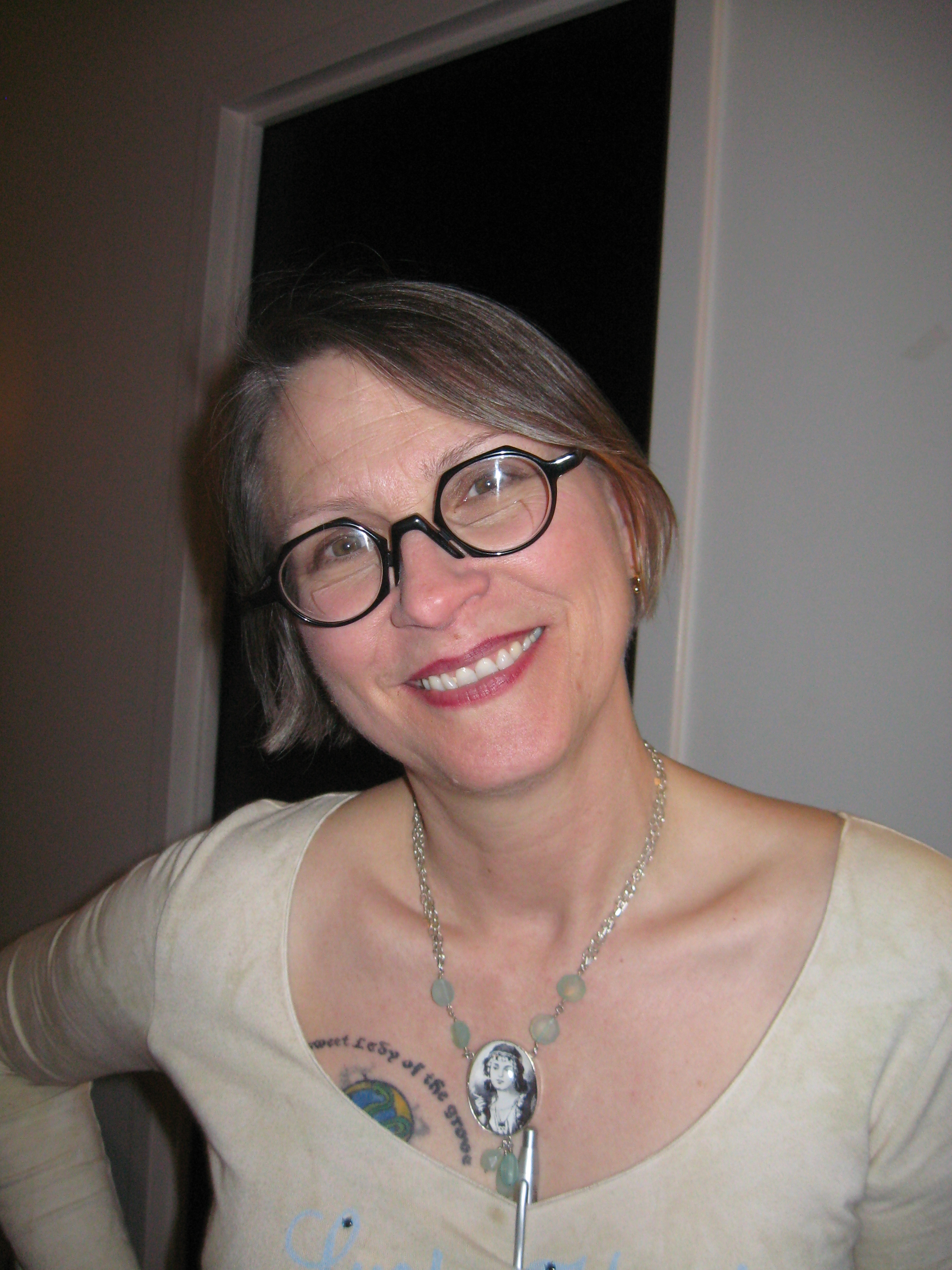
Carol Queen

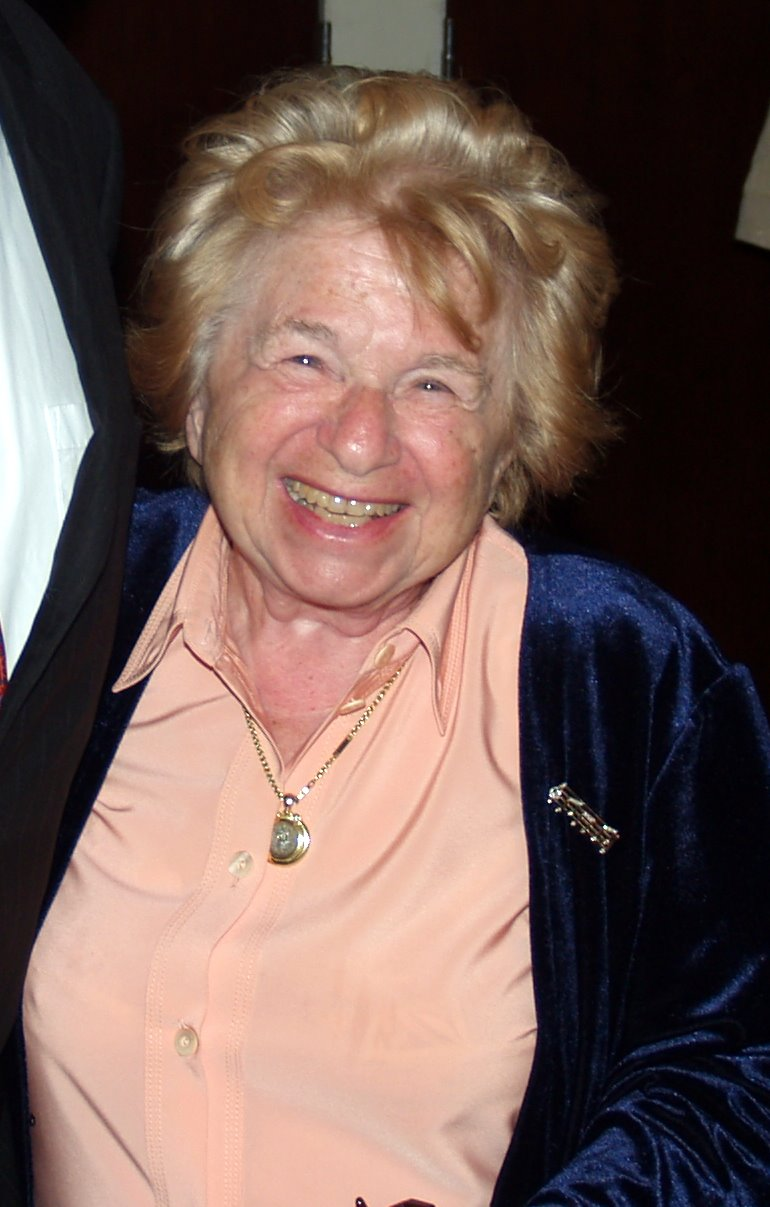
Ruth Westheimer

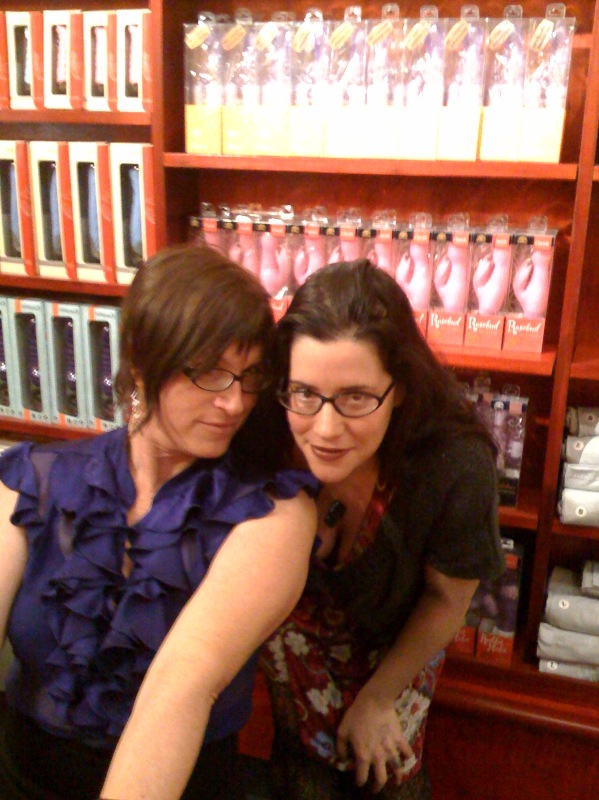
Susie Bright (left) and Rachel Kramer Bussel (right)

Sex therapists, sexologists, and sex-positive feminists including Carol Queen, Ruth Westheimer (Dr. Ruth), Susie Bright, and Rachel Kramer Bussel have recommended the Magic Wand for use by women to aid in self-pleasure.

The Magic Wand received the nickname "the Cadillac of vibrators" from the sex shop Good Vibrations. Boutique erotica store Babeland founders Rachel Venning and Claire Cavanah called the massager the Rolls-Royce of vibrators in their 2003 book Sex Toys 101; this characterization was echoed by authors Anne Hooper and Philip Hodson, and physician Michael L. Krychman. Venning and Cavanah observed that the device alleviated discomfort from menstrual cramps. They recommended the Magic Wand to new users of vibrators who asked for a suggestion for a starter device. Cavanah observed that the Magic Wand was unique among vibrators for its success through word-of-mouth marketing.

Sex-positive feminist writer Susie Bright called the Magic Wand one of her two favorite vibrators, and called it a miracle that the device was able to bring about an orgasm in under sixty seconds. Bright wrote about her experience using the Magic Wand to relieve discomfort during childbirth. Author Kathy Shaidle wrote that the massager is able to give females multiple orgasms. Sociologist, sexologist and sex-positive feminist Carol Queen critiqued the carbon footprint of the Magic Wand because it was imported from Japan, and praised its environmentally friendly qualities including its lack of batteries, and durability compared to other vibrators.

Sex therapist Ruth Westheimer said the device was most favored by those selecting from vibrators of the corded electrical variety. Therapist and sex educator Laura Berman recommended the device in many articles for the Chicago Sun-Times, both for women who had never experienced an orgasm and those who had difficulty becoming aroused. Sexologist Gloria Brame wrote in her book The Truth about Sex, a Sex Primer for the 21st Century that the Magic Wand was one of the more successful masturbation aids marketed, and stated it was popular due to its non-penetrative nature. Australian sex therapist Bettina Arndt reported that a couple she corresponded with had success using the Magic Wand while simultaneously engaging in sexual intercourse. Physician and sex columnist Hilda Hutcherson recommended the Magic Wand in her book Pleasure, and suggested women could place a soft cloth over their vulva if they felt it was needed to decrease delivered intensity from the device. Cosmopolitan magazine reported that the Magic Wand was the vibrator most often suggested by sex therapists.

Paula Kamen, author of Her Way: Young Women Remake the Sexual Revolution, placed the increasing popularity of the Magic Wand as an influential factor in the sexual revolution which took place towards the end of the 20th century. Cathy Winks and Anne Semans, coauthors of The Good Vibrations Guide to Sex, recommended the Magic Wand for use both during foreplay and intercourse and noted couples could feel pleasure through the device together at the same time. Wendy Caster wrote in the 2003 edition of The Lesbian Sex Book that lesbians have enjoyed using the Magic Wand due to its ability to concentrate powerful vibration on the clitoris.

Mobile Magazine announced in its July 2005 issue that readers had voted the Magic Wand "the No. 1 greatest gadget of all time". The Magic Wand won despite being included in the category that included the iPod, the telephone, and the toothbrush. In 2006, Melinda Gallagher and Emily Kramer, founders of women's entertainment company CAKE, awarded the device the Best Vibrator Award in their book A Piece of Cake. Many publications have called the Magic Wand the mother of all vibrators including: The Hot Woman's Handbook, Clean Sheets, the Valley Advocate, and Cosmopolitan Magazine. Gallagher and Kramer wrote that the device was effective at giving the clitoris and vulva intense oscillation sensations.

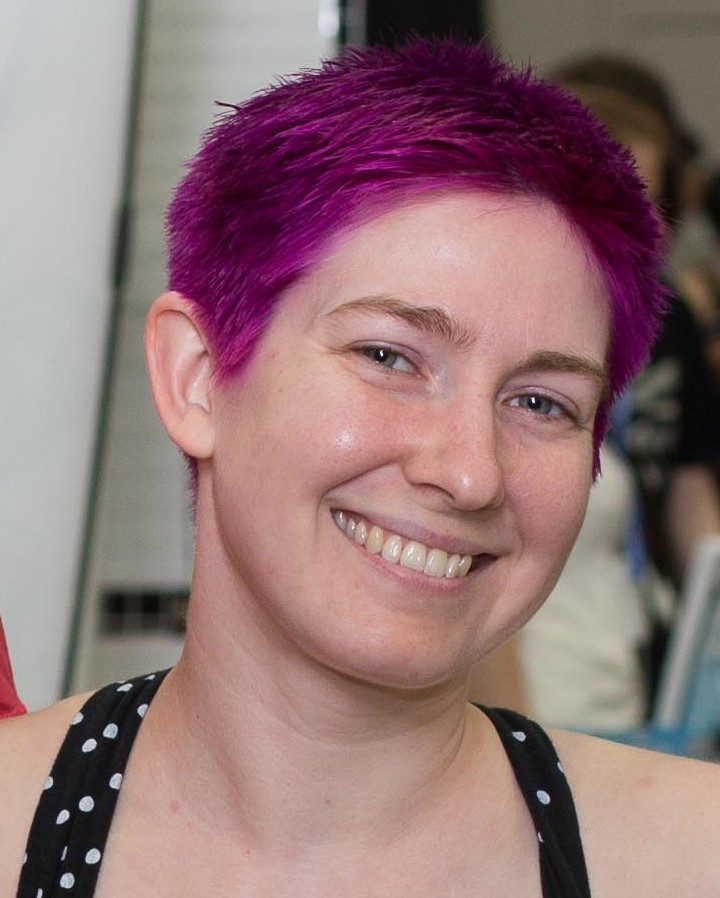
Comic book artist Erika Moen devoted the first piece of her webcomic Oh Joy, Sex Toy to "The Hitachi Magic Wand".

Writing for the Star Tribune, Alexis McKinnis recommended the device for a woman having difficulty achieving orgasm. She wrote that for thirty-years a multitude of females had found it to be an assured way to reach orgasm. McKinnis recommended the Magic Wand again in a subsequent column as a Valentine's Day gift, and wrote that it faced little competition due to its basic construction, efficiency, intensity, and reliability. Author Robert J. Rubel wrote that the device was among the highest-demanded vibrators in the United States. Rubel stated that approximately ninety-percent of females are able to achieve orgasm with the Magic Wand. A panel of users arranged by Good Housekeeping tried the Magic Wand for relief of lumbar discomfort and were unimpressed with the results. Self Magazine observed in 2010 that the device's appreciation had become a cultural phenomenon.

Rachel Kramer Bussel praised the device in a 2011 article for SexIs Magazine titled: "10 Reasons The Hitachi Magic Wand is My Favorite Vibrator". She composed her article in the form of an ode to her favorite toy. Her rationale for selecting the device as her favorite included its power, speed it takes her to a state of increased arousal, its lack of need for batteries, its delivery of intense clitoral sensations, and its affordability. Yana Tallon-Hicks described the device in a 2011 piece for the Valley Advocate, and wrote that it was quite effective at bringing women to orgasm. She compared its intensity to a Mack Truck. Valley Advocate recommended the Magic Wand in a 2012 article for overweight partners to use during sex because of its longer handle. Ashleigh Corbeil wrote in her book about achieving a simultaneous orgasm for two partners that due to its length the Magic Wand could be used during doggy style intercourse; and Hilda Hutcherson similarly advised use of the massager in this sexual position.

Comic book artist Erika Moen devoted the first piece of her new comic strip series Oh Joy, Sex Toy to "The Hitachi Magic Wand" in April 2013. Her work was syndicated by Bitch Media, and received praise in a review by The Daily Beast. In a 2013 article for Express Milwaukee, Laura Anne Stuart said it may be the only device for some women to help them reach orgasm, while additional women may choose to use it to find a simple and quick path to pleasure. She praised its well-built construction and durability. The Magic Wand from Vibratex won the award for "Favorite Sex Toy for Women" in October 2013 at The Sex Awards in California. Valued by users for its durability and long-lasting dependability, the device has garnered attributes such as "the most recognizable sex toy on Earth" from Engadget. In 2014, the magazine Women's Health featured the device in an article titled "The Ultimate Guide to Sex Toys", where it was recommended for use with two partners. In 2025, French singer Jeanne Cherhal released the song "Hitachi Magic Wand" to speak about female pleasure.

=== Awards ===
Year	Award	Work	Organization	Result	References
2005	No. 1 greatest gadget of all time	Hitachi Magic Wand	Mobile Magazine	Won	
2006	Best Vibrator Award	The Hitachi Magic Wand	A Piece of Cake	Won	
2013	Favorite Sex Toy for Women	The Magic Wand from Vibratex	The Sex Awards	Won	

== See also ==
- Autoeroticism
- History of masturbation
- List of Japanese inventions
- Love egg
- Mechanophilia
- Object sexuality
- Science and technology in Japan
- Sexual fetishism
- Sybian
