= Human female sexuality =

Physiology, identity and behavior

Human female sexuality encompasses a broad range of behaviors and processes, including female sexual identity and sexual behavior, the physiological, psychological, social, cultural, political, and spiritual or religious aspects of sexual activity. Various aspects and dimensions of female sexuality, as a part of human sexuality, have also been addressed by principles of ethics, morality, and theology. In almost any historical era and culture, the arts, including literary and visual arts, as well as popular culture, present a substantial portion of a given society's views on human sexuality, which includes both implicit (covert) and explicit (overt) aspects and manifestations of feminine sexuality and behavior.

In most societies and legal jurisdictions, there are legal bounds on what sexual behavior is permitted. Sexuality varies across the cultures and regions of the world, and has continually changed throughout history, and this also applies to female sexuality. Aspects of female sexuality include issues pertaining to body image, self-esteem, personality, sexual orientation, values and attitudes, gender roles, relationships, activity options, and communication.

While most women are heterosexual, and attracted only to men, significant minorities are homosexual (lesbian) or varying degrees of bisexual. Bisexual females are more common than bisexual males.

== Physiological ==
=== General ===
Sexual activity can encompass various sexually stimulating factors (physiological stimulation or psychological stimulation), including sexual fantasies and different sex positions, or the use of sex toys. Foreplay may precede some sexual activities, often leading to sexual arousal of the partners. It is also common for people to be sexually satisfied by being kissed, touched erotically, or held.

=== Orgasm ===
Orgasm, or sexual climax, is the sudden discharge of accumulated sexual tension during the sexual response cycle, resulting in rhythmic muscular contractions in the pelvic region characterized by an intense sensation of pleasure. Women commonly find it difficult to experience orgasms during vaginal intercourse. Mayo Clinic states: "Orgasms vary in intensity, and women vary in the frequency of their orgasms and the amount of stimulation necessary to trigger an orgasm." Additionally, some women may require more than one type of sexual stimulation in order to achieve orgasm. Clitoral stimulation in normal copulation happens when the thrusting of the penis moves the clitoral hood and labia minora, extending from the clitoris.

Orgasm in women has typically been divided into two categories: clitoral and vaginal (or G-spot) orgasms. 70–80% of women require direct clitoral stimulation to achieve orgasm, though indirect clitoral stimulation may also be sufficient. Clitoral orgasms are easier to achieve because the glans of the clitoris, or clitoris as a whole, has more than 8,000 sensory nerve endings, which is as many (or more in some cases) nerve endings as are present in the human penis or glans penis. As the clitoris is homologous to the penis, it is the equivalent in its capacity to receive sexual stimulation.

Although orgasms by vaginal stimulation are more difficult to achieve, the G-spot area may produce an orgasm if properly stimulated. The G-spot's existence, and existence as a distinct structure, is still under dispute, as its reported location can vary from woman to woman, appears to be nonexistent in some women, and it is hypothesized to be an extension of the clitoris and therefore the reason for orgasms experienced vaginally.

Women are able to achieve multiple orgasms due to the fact that they generally do not require a refractory period like men do after the first orgasm. Although it is reported that women do not experience a refractory period and thus can experience an additional orgasm, or multiple orgasms, soon after the first orgasm, some sources state that both men and women experience a refractory period because, due to clitoral hypersensitivity or sexual satisfaction, women may experience a very small period after orgasm in which further sexual stimulation does not produce excitement.

Nipples can be sensitive to touch, and nipple stimulation can incite sexual arousal. Few women report experiencing orgasm from nipple stimulation. Before Komisaruk et al.'s functional magnetic resonance (fMRI) research on nipple stimulation in 2011, reports of women achieving orgasm from nipple stimulation relied solely on anecdotal evidence. Komisaruk's study was the first to map the female genitals onto the sensory portion of the brain; it indicates that sensation from the nipples travels to the same part of the brain as sensations from the vagina, clitoris and cervix, and that these reported orgasms are genital orgasms caused by nipple stimulation, and may be directly linked to the genital sensory cortex ("the genital area of the brain").

== Sexual attraction ==
Women, on average, tend to be more attracted to men who have a relatively narrow waist, a V-shaped torso, and broad shoulders. Women also tend to be more attracted to men who are taller than they are, and display a high degree of facial symmetry, as well as relatively masculine facial dimorphism. Based on contemporary research and surveys, women, regardless of sexual orientation, are just as interested in a partner's physical attractiveness as men are.

== Control of female sexuality ==
Historically, many cultures have viewed female sexuality as being subordinate to male sexuality, and as something to be controlled through restrictions on female behavior. Traditional cultural practices, such as enforced modesty and chastity, have tended to place restrictions principally on women, without imposing similar restrictions on men.

=== Historical and cultural practices ===
Some controversial traditional cultural practices, such as female genital mutilation (FGM), have been described as attempts at nullifying women's sexuality altogether. FGM continues to be practised in some parts of Africa and the Middle East, as well as in some immigrant communities in Western countries, though it is widely outlawed. The procedure is typically carried out on young girls, before the age of 15.

Methods employed to control female sexuality and behavior include the threat of death, such as honor killings. The reason for such a killing may include refusing to enter an arranged marriage, being in a relationship that is disapproved by their relatives, having sex outside marriage, becoming the victim of rape, or dressing in ways which are deemed inappropriate.

Another historical device used to control female sexual behavior was the chastity belt, which is a locking item of clothing designed to prevent sexual intercourse. The belts were worn by women to protect their chastity, which included preventing masturbation (such as by fingering) or sexual access by unauthorized males.

Prior to the European colonization of North America, Native American attitudes regarding female sexuality were generally open-minded, particularly for younger, un-married women. However, when Europeans arrived, more rigid views were enforced. These rigid views were especially restrictive for women, predominantly in Puritan colonies. Following the European colonization of North America, there was the creation of the African American archetypes of the Jezebel and mammy. The Jezebel was characterized as a woman who was lewd, tempting and seductive. Mammies, also called Aunt Jemima, were maternal figures who were portrayed as content within the institution of slavery – always with a smile on her face as the white family took up her life and her entire world. These stereotyping frameworks not only justified slavery but also justified the rape and abuse of African American women as being sexually driven, sexual beings in the case of the Jezebel, or a being where sex and sexuality are the last things on a woman's mind because her world is taken up by the lives of her white masters in the case of the mammy.

=== Psychological explanations ===
In analytical psychology, the psyche of a person is understood to be differentiated, being made-up of psychological traits that are feminine and masculine in nature. According to Carl Jung, this differentiation allowed the formation of opposite polarities, which made "consciousness possible". According to psychologist and author Giorgio Tricarico, as an individual moves through various sexual experiences, their psyche approaches wholeness or the state of "non-differentiated"—a realm of unified consciousness—considered belonging to the sacred or divine.

The feminine is believed to embody particular qualities of the sacred or divine more broadly and deeply than the masculine, consequently in women, the ability to incorporate the non-differentiated awareness is assumed to be higher than in men. According to Tricarico, the unconscious perception by men of this greater ability in women to reach the undifferentiated state of psyche is a cause for their intentional humiliation, wilful devaluation, and deliberate belittlement of women. The use of epithets like "bitch", "whore", "slut" for sexually active women has been attributed to the denial of the subjective feminine by men. The subdued acceptance of female sexuality, as a value in its own right, is manifested when a man's admiration for the "bitch" gets subtended if she happens to be his wife or girlfriend. Along with showing "admiration, lust, gratitude, and desire", men show brazen hate and disgust towards women, this behavioral dichotomy has been ascribed to the "patriarchal hypocrisy" embedded in men.

According to Julia Kristeva, a psychoanalyst scholar, the psychological rejection and fear of the mother figure in males is the root cause for their behaviors that seek to subjugate women. Men in their infancy live in a state of "undifferentiated physical and psychic fusion" with the mother, experiencing "emotional exhilaration and jouissance". However, as they mature, sensing their separateness from the mother, they seek to become independent subjects and take recourse to paternal images and patriarchal behaviors with the hope of eliminating any possible further "undifferentiated/psychotic fusion" with the mother as they feel threatened by it. According to psychoanalyst Melanie Klein, the rejection and fear of the maternal image, in females, leads them to reject their own femininity.

According to psychoanalytic literature, the "Madonna–whore complex" is said to occur when a male desires sexual encounters only with women whom he sees as degraded (whore) while he cannot desire sexually a respectable woman (Madonna). This was first described by Sigmund Freud. The interpretation of female sexuality is significantly different according to C.G. Jung's psychological research. He explained the female libido as a precursor of cultural expression and personal creativity. He identified Freud's theories as the source of this significant misunderstanding, and theorized that the "rhythmic factor" is not merely a principle in the "nutritive phase" and later in sexuality, but that it is at the base of all emotional processes.

== Modern studies ==
In the modern age, psychologists and physiologists explored female sexuality. Sigmund Freud propounded the theory of two kinds of female orgasms, "the vaginal kind, and the clitoral orgasm." However, Masters and Johnson (1966) and Helen O'Connell (2005) reject this distinction.

Ernst Gräfenberg was famous for his studies of female genitalia and human female sexual physiology. He published, among other studies, the pioneering The Role of Urethra in Female Orgasm (1950), which describes female ejaculation, as well as an erogenous zone where the urethra is closest to the vaginal wall. In 1981, sexologists John D. Perry and Beverly Whipple named that area the Gräfenberg spot, or G-spot, in his honor. The medical community generally has not embraced the complete concept of the G-spot.

Several studies establish that women are generally aroused by sexual stimuli of both sexes, while men are substantially aroused by stimuli of their preferred sex, and not of their non-preferred sex. This difference is consistent across different measures of arousal, such as genital response, pupil dilation, and viewing time. Significant sexual arousal in response to both male and female sexual cues can be characterized as typical for females, while significant sexual arousal exclusively to one's preferred gender can be considered typical for males. But lesbians are likelier to exhibit stronger sexual arousal in response to female stimuli than to male stimuli, and thus a more "male-typical" response.

== Feminist views ==
In the 1970s and 1980s, long-held Western traditional views on female sexuality came to be challenged and reassessed as part of the sexual revolution. The feminist movement and numerous feminist writers addressed female sexuality from a female perspective, rather than allowing female sexuality to be defined in terms of male sexuality. One of the first such popular non-fiction books was Nancy Friday's My Secret Garden. Other writers, such as Germaine Greer, Simone de Beauvoir and Camille Paglia, were particularly influential, although their views were not universally or placidly accepted. Toward the end of the 20th century the most significant European contributions to understanding female sexuality came from psychoanalytical French feminism, with the work of Luce Irigaray and Julia Kristeva.

Lesbianism and female bisexuality also emerged as topics of interest within feminism. The concept of political lesbianism, associated particularly with second wave feminism and radical feminism, includes, but is not limited to, lesbian separatism, notable proponents being Sheila Jeffreys and Julie Bindel.

Feminist attitudes to female sexuality have varied in scope throughout the movement's history. Generally, modern feminists advocate for all women to have access to sexual healthcare and education, and agree on the importance of reproductive health freedoms, particularly regarding issues such as birth control and family planning. Bodily autonomy and consent are also concepts of high importance in modern feminist views of female sexuality.

Matters such as the sex industry, sexual representation in the media, and issues regarding consent to sex under conditions of male dominance have been more controversial topics among feminists. These debates culminated in the late 1970s and the 1980s, in what came to be known as the feminist sex wars, which pitted anti-pornography feminism against sex-positive feminism. Parts of the feminist movement were deeply divided on these issues.

== Legislation ==
Laws around the world affect the expression of female sexuality, and the circumstances under which an individual may not engage sexually with a woman or girl. Forced sexual encounters are usually prohibited, though some countries may sanction rape in marriage. Age of consent laws, which differ between jurisdictions, set the minimum age at which a minor girl may engage in sex. In recent years, the age of consent has risen in some jurisdictions and has been lowered in others.

In some countries there are laws against pornography and prostitution (or certain aspects of those). Laws in some jurisdictions prohibit sex outside of marriage, such as premarital sex or adultery, with critics arguing that, in practice, these laws are used to control women's and not men's behavior. The virginity and family honor of women still play an important role in some legal systems: in some jurisdictions, the punishment for rape is more severe if the woman was a virgin at the time of the crime, and under some legal systems a man who rapes a woman can escape punishment if he marries her.

== Women as responsible for sexual safety ==
With regard to the responsibility for safe sexual activity in heterosexual relationships, the commonly held definition of safe sex may be examined; it has been argued that there are three facets to the common perception of safe sex: emotional safety (trusting one's partner), psychological safety (feeling safe), and biomedical safety (the barrier of fluids which may cause pregnancy or transmit infection). The phrase "safe sex" is commonly known to refer to biomedical safety.

Since the sexual revolution, health officials have launched campaigns to bring awareness to the risks of unprotected sexual intercourse. While the dangers of unprotected sex include unintended pregnancy, sexually transmitted infections (STIs), with HIV/AIDS being the deadliest, the use of contraceptive devices (the most reliable being condoms) remain inconsistent.

The social construction of masculinity and femininity play a lead role in understanding why women are commonly held responsible for the outcome of sexual encounters. Often, societies create different sexual norms and assumptions for women and men, with female and male sexuality often seen as being the opposite of one another: for example, females are commonly taught that they "should not want sexual activity or find it pleasurable, or have sexual relations outside of marriage," while males are commonly taught to "feel entitled to have sexual relations and pleasure and that their self-worth is demonstrated through their sexual prowess and notions of authority and power". Sexual interactions often take place in unequal structural circumstances in the context of imbalance of power between men and women. Feminists, such as Catharine Mackinnon, have stated that the inequality in which heterosexual intercourse takes place should not be ignored and should play a crucial role in policies; Mackinnon has argued: "The assumption is that women can be unequal to men economically, socially, culturally, politically, and in religion, but the moment they have sexual interactions, they are free and equal. That's the assumption – and I think it ought to be thought about, and in particular what consent then means."

Socially constructed masculinity might suggest that men are constantly interested in sex, and that once men are sexually aroused, they must be satisfied through orgasm. This drive is intertwined with the male identity and consequently creates a momentum that, once started, is difficult to stop. Socially constructed femininity might suggest the connotation of passivity, which has affected the cultural importance of female desire. This is a factor that contributes to women's sexual desires being largely ignored; because men are seen as unable to control their sexuality, this can make women responsible for enforcing condom use instead of the "uncontrollable" male. Some scholars argue that a contributing factor in this division of responsibility for safe sex factors is the privileged status of male desire in Western culture, as indicated by the commonly held belief that the female sexual experience is not adversely affected by condom use but that the male sexual experience is diminished with the addition of this barrier. They believe that this is problematic, as the use of condoms is symbolically linked to casual sex and promiscuity, which goes against the social norms of femininity. This link is considered something that cannot be underestimated as "discontinuation of condom use becomes a test or a marker which signifies the existence of a committed and exclusive relationship," and demonstrates trust.

Others speculate that the responsibility for condom use falling on women is not so much imposed by society, but is instead resultant of the possible consequences of unprotected sex being generally more serious for women than men (pregnancy, greater likelihood of STI transmission, etc.). Bacterial STIs, such as chlamydia and gonorrhea, show that rates among women can be three times higher than men in high prevalence areas of the United States, and one-fourth of pregnancies in developing countries and one-half of pregnancies in the United States are unintended.

Another social idea of sexuality is the coital imperative. The coital imperative is the idea that for sex to be real, there must be penile-vaginal intercourse. For many women, this imposes limitations to the sexual possibilities and a condom is seen as a symbol of the end of the sexual experience. Public acceptance of penis-vagina penetration as central to a sexual relationship is reinforced by the focus on condom use. These ideas, male sex drive and coital imperative, paired with the social construction of femininity, may lead to an imbalance of the power in making the decision to use a condom.

== See also ==
- Clitoral pump
- Clitoral vibrator
- Dildo
- Dominatrix
- Erotic plasticity
- Erotica: A Journey Into Female Sexuality
- Extended female sexuality
- Female ejaculation
- Female promiscuity
- Female sexual arousal disorder
- Female sodomy
- Female submission
- Feminist theory
- French feminism
- Human female reproductive system
- Human male sexuality
- Love egg
- Madonna and sexuality
- Medieval female sexuality
- Penis envy
- Porn for women
- Rabbit vibrator
- Sex toy party
- Sexual and reproductive health and rights
- Sexual practices between women
- Vibrator (sex toy)
- Victimization of bisexual women
- Women's sexuality in Francoist Spain
- Women who have sex with women
- Women's erotica
