= Bedazzler =

Home appliance used to fasten rhinestones to fabrics

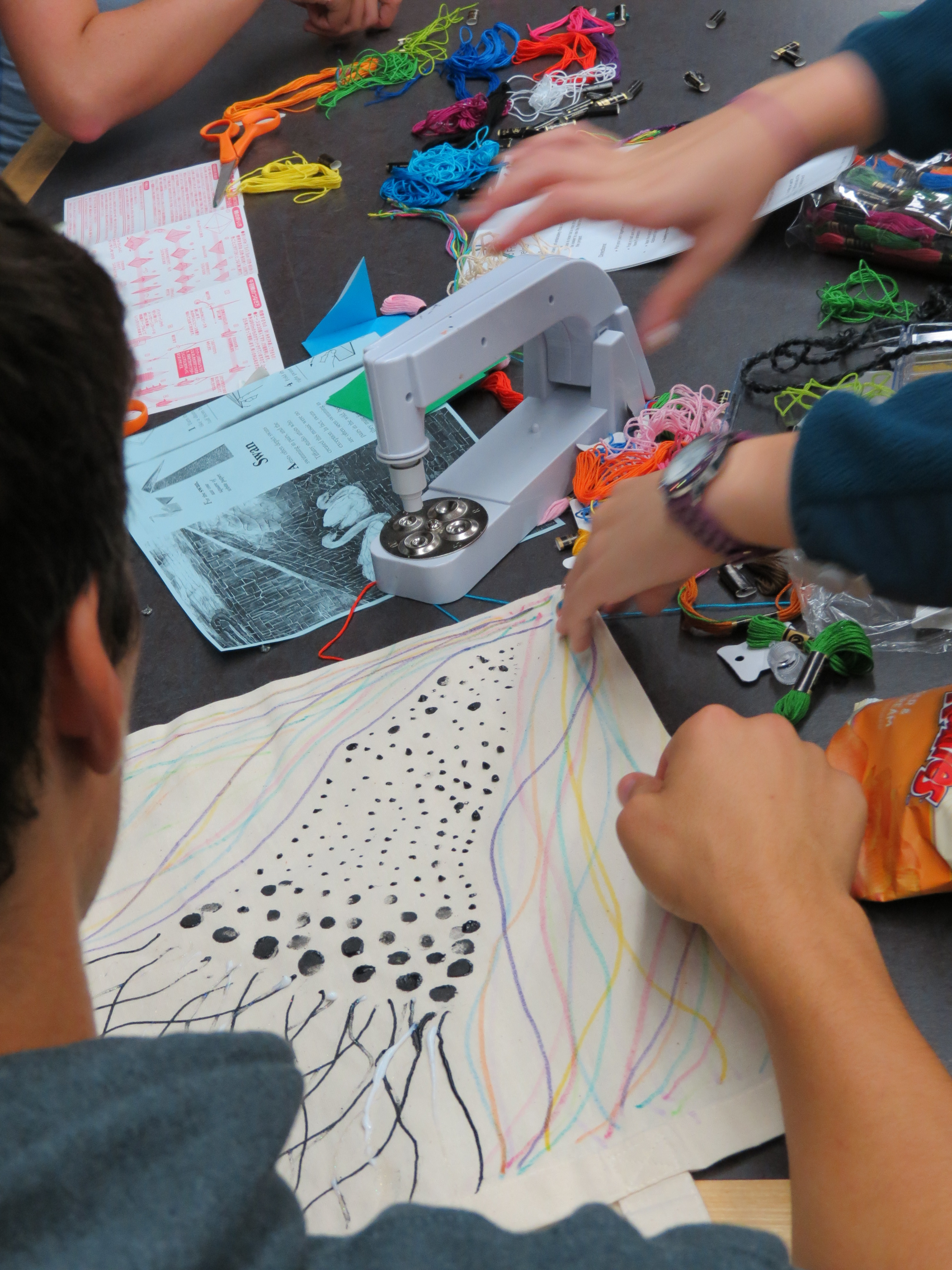
- People have used the white bedazzler tool shown here to adorn their projects.
- Manufacturer: NSI Innovations
- Website: https://www.getbedazzler.com/

The Bedazzler is a home appliance which is used to fasten rhinestones, studs and patches to clothes and different fabrics.

== Reception ==
The Bedazzler was voted #100 in the Top 100 Gadgets of all time (Mobile PC Magazine March 2005 edition). Craft magazine - 'CNA Magazine' featured the Bedazzler on its cover in the January 2001 edition.

Like any fashion item, the popularity of the device and its output has waxed and decreased over time. Due to its low cost and the type of glitzy clothes and accessories that can be created using a bedazzler, it is often associated with kitsch and retro fashion.

A commentator in Entertainment Weekly magazine described the Bedazzler as: "The cheap-ass rhinestone-studding tool favored by art teachers and over-excitable soccer moms everywhere, the biggest piece of crap sold on late-night TV since the ThighMaster, the reason women own shirts with glittery kitty-cats on them."

== See also ==
- I Love the '70s: Volume 2 - A VH1 sequel miniseries was focused on 1970s pop culture.
