= G-spot vibrator =

Sex toy

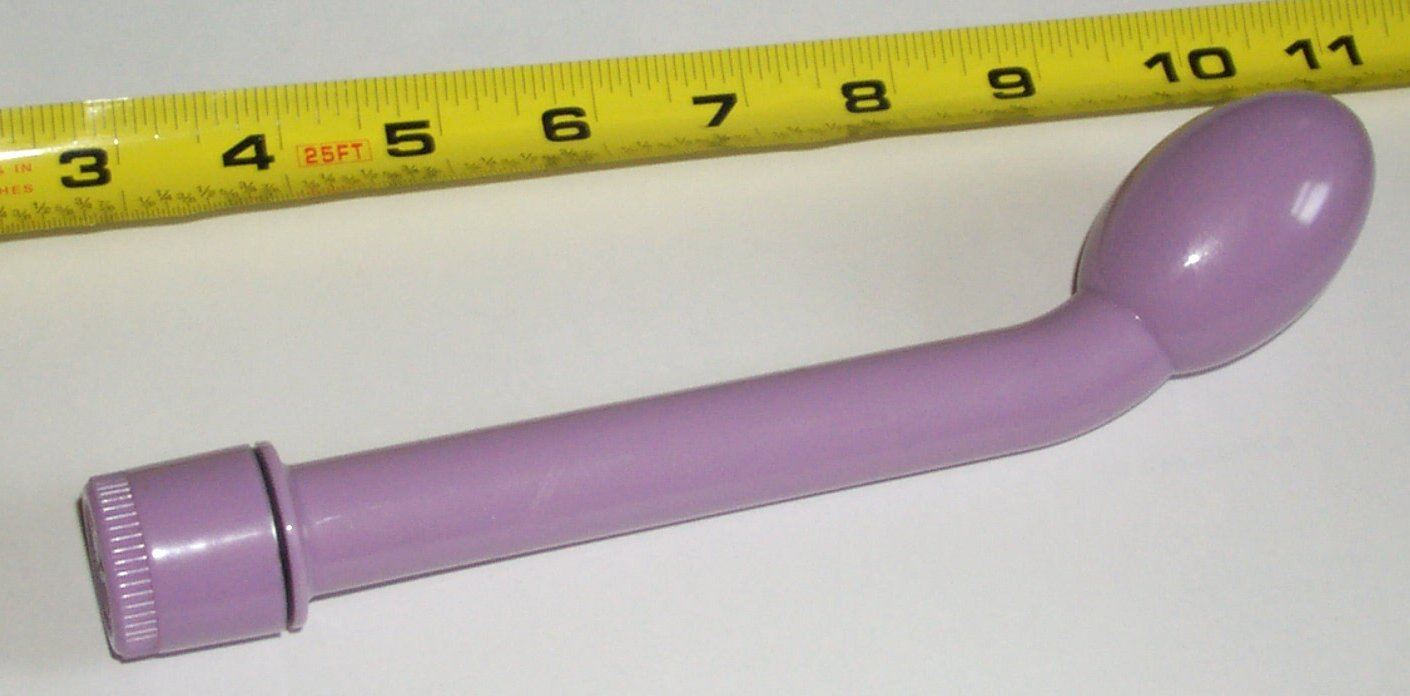
G-spot vibrator (ruler is in inches)

A G-spot vibrator is a sex toy with female and male varieties. The female version of the device is built to massage the G-spot, described as a bean-shaped area of the vagina. Some women report that it is an erogenous zone which, when stimulated, can lead to strong sexual arousal, powerful orgasms, and female ejaculation. The male version of the G-spot vibrator is used for massaging the prostate for both sexual and health-related reasons.

== Female and male versions ==
=== Female G-spot vibrators ===
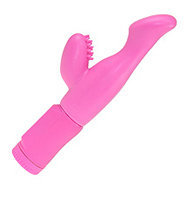
G-spot and clitoral vibrator

The female type is of phallus-like shape and is especially designed for stimulating the G-spot. It first appeared as a response to complaints that vaginal penetration alone, provided by the penis or otherwise, was generally not enough for women to reach orgasm. Women usually need direct clitoral stimulation to orgasm, and stimulating the G-spot area through sexual penetration, especially in the missionary position, is difficult to achieve because of the special angle at which penetration must occur. The curved structure of the G-spot vibrator attempts to make stimulating the G-spot area possible without awkward body positioning.

The level of vaginal penetration when using a G-spot vibrator depends on the woman because women's physiology is not always the same. The effects of G-spot stimulation when using the penis or a G-spot vibrator may be enhanced by additionally stimulating other erogenous zones on a woman's body, such as the clitoris or vulva as a whole. When using a G-spot vibrator, this may be done by manually stimulating the clitoris, using the vibrator as a clitoral vibrator in addition to a G-spot vibrator, or, if the vibrator is designed for it, by applying it so that it stimulates the head of the clitoris, the rest of the vulva, and the vagina simultaneously.

Almost all female G-spot vibrators feature a phallus shape with a curved end designed to reach the anterior (front-most) area of the vagina. There are also models described as novelty or specialized G-spot vibrators that use different shapes or mechanisms. Some devices, such as those produced by Lovense, include functions like oscillation or thrusting motions for G-spot stimulation, in addition to or instead of vibration. Generally, G-spot vibrators have a head slightly larger than the glans penis, and are 1–1.5 in (2–3 cm) wide and 5–7 in (12.5–17.5 cm) long.

=== Male G-spot vibrators ===
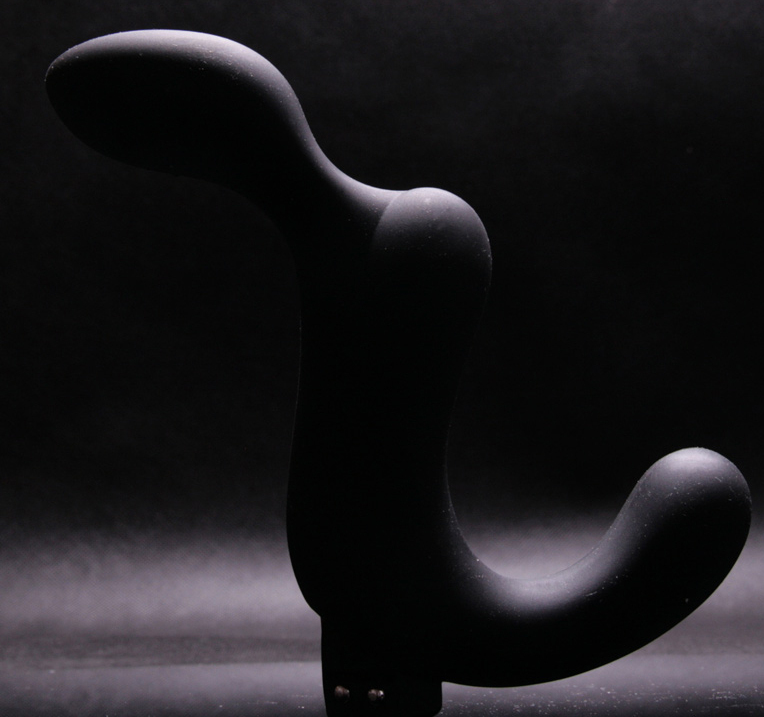
Prostate massager

The prostate massager is a curved device with a round head which is inserted into the anal canal of a male and stimulates the prostate gland, which is also called the male G-spot or P-spot. This can produce a host of different and intense sensations.

== Materials ==
G-spot vibrators are usually manufactured from materials that provide a pleasant touch: silicone, jelly, rubber, hard plastic, or any combination of them.

== See also ==
- Hitachi Magic Wand
- Wand vibrator
