= Doxy (vibrator) =

Brand of wand vibrator

The Doxy is a brand of British-made wand vibrators. The Doxy was created in 2013 in response to the unavailability of the Hitachi Magic Wand in the United Kingdom. It has been described as the most powerful wand vibrator on the market.

As of 2020, it is manufactured in Callington, in the county of Cornwall in the south of England.

== History ==
Doxy was originally founded in 2013 by ex-marketer William Garland and engineer Andrew Crichton at CMG Leisure. Garland says that he got the name from "an Olde English word for a woman of slightly loose morals, but not a term of abuse." The product was debuted at the 2013 Erotic Trade Only showcase. Garland left CMG Leisure in 2020 due to health complications. In 2025, Garland, with former CMG Leisure marketing director Leigh Dedhar, reacquired the rights to the Doxy brand and have begun rebranding as Doxy 2.0.
