= Philips Intimate Massager =

Range of sex toys produced by Philips

The Philips Intimate Massager is a range of electric personal massagers made by Philips which were first introduced to the UK market during 2008. When the line was launched, commentators questioned whether Philips' movement into the sex-toy market was a sign that sex-toys were gaining mainstream acceptance. After only two years, however, the line was discontinued due to "lack of demand".

== See also ==
- Hitachi Magic Wand

== Sources and further reading ==
- Philips Intimate Massager official site
- Philips changes the mood with Warm Intimate Massager
- Electronics giant Philips to launch sex toy range
