= Wild Blood (video game) =

2012 mobile video game

- Developer: Gameloft
- Publisher: Gameloft
- Producers: Jonathan Stock; Jean-Claude Labelle
- Designers: Stanislas Dewavrin; Mei Dong Sheng
- Artists: Gwenael Heliou; Arthur Hugot
- Engine: Unreal Engine 3
- Platforms: Android, iOS
- Release: September 6, 2012
- Genre: Hack and slash
- Modes: Single-player, multiplayer

Wild Blood is an action game developed and published by Gameloft for iOS (iPhone and iPad) and Android in 2012.

== Gameplay ==
Wild Blood is a hack and slash game where the main weapons are a sword, axe, and bow, each with various combo moves, plus magic attacks with mainly three elements (fire, ice, and thunder). Players have to kill a certain number of enemies in order to pass to the other side of a level. Players can save their progress at fountains, where they can also buy new weapons and armours. The game also has a four-on-four online multiplayer with Capture the Flag and Team Deathmatch modes.

== Plot ==
Wild Blood is inspired by Arthurian legends. In the game, the player controls Sir Lancelot in his fight against the jealous and mad King Arthur who, enraged by Lancelot's affair with Queen Guinevere, has given the power over the kingdom to his evil sorceress sister Morgana to punish his wife and his former friend. The dark witch in turn opened a portal to Hell, unleashing legions of demonic beasts to serve as her minions, and also captured Guinevere and holds her hostage in a tower on the magical island of Avalon. In order to save his beloved, Lancelot needs to take on hellspawn hordes to defeat the King and then Morgana, who is able to turn into dragon. For this he will use a help from allies such as Gawain and Merlin, the latter of whom needs to be first freed himself.

== Reception ==
Reception

Aggregate score
Aggregator	Score
Metacritic	70/100

Review score
Publication	Score
TouchArcade	3/5

Wild Blood mixed or average reviews, resulting in a Metacritic score of 70/100. The game received 7/10 from IGN's Justin Davis, who praised its "incredible visuals" and "varied and satisfying combat", but criticized "frustrating camera and control issues hold[ing] the title back from greatness," a sentiment shared by Andrew Grush from Mobile Magazine and by Andrew Nesvadba from AppSpy, who rated it a 4/5 (Good). CNET's Rick Broida called it "groundbreaking" and "console quality" game that is "a blast to play," yet TouchArcade's Eric Ford awarded the game just three stars out of five, opining "every positive seems to be counter-balanced by an unnecessary negative" and concluded "it's a mixed bag." On the other hand, 148Apps's Michael Halloran gave it a near-perfect four-and-half star rating, especially praising its graphics and also sound, while Gamereactor's Lee West gave it a 9/10. AppAdvice's Sean Capelle too noted the "stunning" graphics" that, "combined with the adrenaline-fueled gameplay, make this an addictive game to be reckoned with." Eurogamer's Alberto Destro, however, lambasted "overly repetitive gameplay mechanics combined with a total lack of experimenting transform a promising hack and slash in a sterile button mashing in medieval sauce." According to Pocket Gamer's Harry Slater, due to this it "is only fun in small bursts." Slide to Play review stated: "If you're looking for a pretty fun game that's full of amazing sights and sounds, then Wild Blood is for you. If you're looking for original gameplay, then you may want to look elsewhere."
