= Dell Williams =

American actress (1922–2015)

Dell Williams (née Zetlin; August 5, 1922 – March 11, 2015) was an American businesswoman and advocate of women's liberation, sexuality, and sexual health. She was the founder (in 1974) of the first feminist sex toy business in the U.S., Eve's Garden, in New York City. It was the first woman-owned and woman-operated sex toy business in America.

== Career ==
In 1945, she enlisted in the Women's Army Corps. In 1974, she founded the first feminist sex toy business in the U.S., Eve's Garden, in New York City. Eve's Garden was the first woman-owned and woman-operated sex toy business in America. As Williams put it, "Eve represented all women and the Garden was symbolic of women taking responsibility for their 'own' sexuality."

She was inspired to found the business after she took a “Body/Sex Workshop” by Betty Dodson in New York and afterwards went to buy a Hitachi Magic Wand for use as a vibrator, but found that the salesboy at Macy's asked her a nosy question about it. Williams also attributed the founding of the store to having read Wilhelm Reich's The Function of the Orgasm in her early twenties.

Williams was an actress for a time and appeared in productions of The Vagina Monologues. Her most notable role may have been in a 1962 film, The Cliff Dwellers, a film which was nominated for an Academy Award. In addition to this, she was a singer, artists’ model, and writer during the 1930s and 1940s, and was later one of the first successful female advertising executives in New York City.

== Personal life ==
She was the daughter of Isaac and Sarah (née Bronstein) Zetlin. She was briefly married once, to Ted Willms, a variation of whose surname she retained professionally although the marriage was annulled. She had no children.

Williams died in Manhattan on March 11, 2015, age 92.

== Legacy ==
In 2005, her memoir, Revolution in the Garden, was published. Some of her papers are held as the Dell Williams Papers in the Human Sexuality Division of Rare and Manuscript Collections at the Cornell University Library.
