= Experimental Brain Research =

- Discipline: Neuroscience
- Language: English

Publication details
- History: 1966-present
- Publisher: Springer Science+Business Media
- Frequency: Monthly
- Impact factor: 2.395 (2011)

Standard abbreviations
- ISO 4: Exp. Brain Res.

Indexing
- CODEN: EXBRAP
- ISSN: 0014-4819 (print); 1432-1106 (web)
- LCCN: 65009990
- OCLC no.: 474767723

Links
- Journal homepage; Online access

Experimental Brain Research is a peer-reviewed scientific journal covering research in neuroscience. The journal was established in 1966 and is published by Springer Science+Business Media. According to the Journal Citation Reports, the journal has a 2020 5-year impact factor of 2.166.
