= Dermatology Online Journal =

- Discipline: Dermatology
- Language: English
- Edited by: Barbara Burrall

Publication details
- History: 1995-present
- Publisher: University of California, Davis
- Frequency: Monthly
- Open access: Yes
- License: Creative Commons BY-NC-ND

Standard abbreviations
- ISO 4: Dermatol. Online J.

Indexing
- ISSN: 1087-2108
- OCLC no.: 34221587

Links
- Journal homepage; Online archive

The Dermatology Online Journal is a monthly open-access peer-reviewed medical journal that was established in 1995 by Arthur Huntley (Department of Dermatology, University of California, Davis). It is published by the California Digital Library and covers all aspects of general dermatology. The current editor-in-chief is Barbara Burrall (University of California Davis).

Besides medical information, the journal provides medical perspectives on non-medical topics and the Dermatology Online Journal published the first dermatology training program ranking.

== Abstracting and Indexing ==
The journal is indexed in PubMed, MEDLINE, and Scopus.
