= Neuroscience Letters =

- Discipline: Neuroscience
- Language: English
- Edited by: Stephen G. Waxman

Publication details
- History: 1975-present
- Publisher: Elsevier
- Frequency: Biweekly
- Impact factor: 3.046 (2020)

Standard abbreviations
- ISO 4: Neurosci. Lett.

Indexing
- ISSN: 0304-3940
- OCLC no.: 1874501

Links
- Journal homepage; Online access

Neuroscience Letters is a biweekly rapid-publication scientific journal for short articles covering all aspects of neuroscience. According to the Journal Citation Reports, Neuroscience Letters has a 2020 impact factor of 3.046.
