= Journal of Perinatal & Neonatal Nursing =

- Discipline: Obstetrical nursing, Neonatal nursing
- Language: English
- Edited by: Perinatal Editor: Lynette Hamlin, PhD, RN, CNM, FACNM, FAAN Neonatal Editor: Terri Marin, PhD, NNP-BC, FAAN, FAANP, FNAP

Publication details
- History: 1987-present
- Publisher: Lippincott Williams & Wilkins (United States)
- Frequency: Quarterly
- Open access: Hybrid
- Impact factor: 1.3 (2024)

Standard abbreviations
- ISO 4: J. Perinat. Neonatal Nurs.

Indexing
- CODEN: JPNNE8
- ISSN: 0893-2190 (print); 1550-5073 (web)
- OCLC no.: 15465213

Links
- Journal homepage; Online access; Online archive

The Journal of Perinatal & Neonatal Nursing is a peer-reviewed nursing journal of perinatal nursing and neonatal nursing. Each issue is presented in a topic-oriented format. It is popularly known as the "Pink Journal".

== Abstracting and indexing ==
The journal is covered by CINAHL. According to the Journal Citation Reports, the journal has a 2024 impact factor of 1.3.
