= Love egg =

Type of sensual vibrator used for stimulation

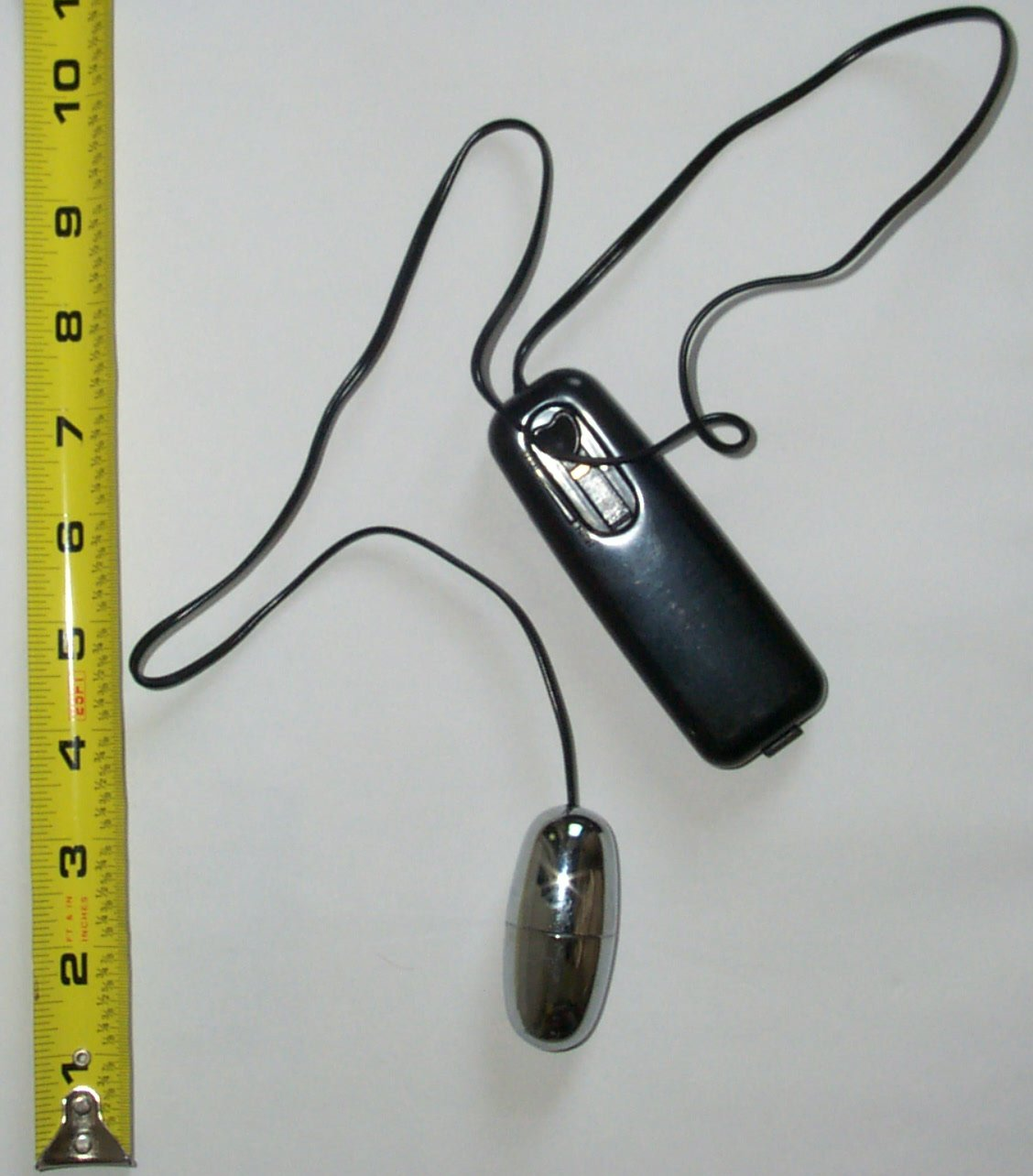
An egg vibrator

A love egg is a type of egg- or bullet-shaped vibrator that is used for stimulation. They can also be referred to as egg vibrators or bullet vibrators, depending on their shape. They are typically weaker than larger external vibrators, such as wands, but are still popular due to their lower price and discreet nature. The primary purpose of these vibrators is targeted stimulation of internal or external erogenous zones.

== History ==
In the 1950s vibrators became more readily available for sexual pleasure, and some were designed for insertion into the vagina or anus. Nonetheless, the contemporary love egg was developed during the 1980s and 1990s when advancements in technology permitted the creation of smaller and more inconspicuous sex toys. Because of their compact size and the possibility of using them discreetly, love eggs became a favored option.

== Structure ==
The device consists of an egg- or bullet-shaped vibrating item, which can be wireless or connected to an external battery pack. Some wireless varieties can be controlled using a remote. There are also microchip controlled devices which can provide various patterns or irregularities in vibration.

== Use ==
Love eggs are a type of sex toy designed for internal vaginal or anal use, often used for enhancing sexual stimulation. They can be used either solo or with a partner, and the remote control feature enables playful and discreet experimentation. Users often report that love eggs intensify their sexual experience and can lead to more intense orgasms.

== Functions and features ==
Love eggs are frequently manufactured using body-safe materials, such as silicone or ABS plastic, and are obtainable in a range of sizes and shapes to accommodate individual preferences. Typically, they are powered by batteries and equipped with a remote that regulates different vibration speeds and patterns. App-controlled love eggs may feature ergonomic designs and body-safe materials; these are produced by a number of companies, including Lovense. Additionally, some love eggs feature other functionalities, such as waterproofing, rechargeable batteries, or app compatibility for remote control via a smartphone. Certain models even possess a built-in camera that captures and transmits videos or images to a partner's device. Love eggs are often designed to be discreet and user-friendly, with a sleek surface and a quiet motor. They may also be provided with a storage case or pouch for convenient and hygienic storage.

== Materials ==
Love eggs are sexual devices that come in various shapes, sizes, and materials. They are used for internal vaginal or anal stimulation and are commonly made from materials such as silicone, ABS plastic, and metal. When selecting a love egg, it is essential to consider the materials used in its construction. Body-safe materials like silicone and ABS plastic are highly recommended because they are non-porous and easy to clean, making them ideal for frequent use. One crucial factor to consider when selecting a love egg is the presence of phthalates in the material. Phthalates are harmful chemicals that are found in some plastics and have been linked to adverse health effects, such as reproductive issues and developmental problems. Thus, it is essential to select a love egg that is free of phthalates and made from safe materials. Silicone and ABS plastic are popular choices for love eggs because they can be shaped into various sizes and shapes, making them highly customizable to individual preferences. Additionally, these materials are non-toxic and non-porous, making them easy to clean and disinfect after use. Furthermore, silicone and ABS plastic love eggs tend to have a smooth surface, making them comfortable to use, and their quiet motors make for a discreet experience

== Advantages and disadvantages ==
=== Advantages ===
- Enhanced sexual pleasure: Many people find that using a love egg can enhance their sexual pleasure and lead to more intense orgasms.
- Discreet play: The remote control allows for discreet play, which can be exciting and fun for some people.
- Variety: Love eggs come in a variety of sizes and shapes, so users can find one that fits their individual preferences.

=== Disadvantages ===
- Battery life: Love eggs are powered by batteries, which can run out quickly if the toy is used frequently.
- Noise: Some love eggs can be noisy, which can be a problem if users want to use them in a public or shared living space.
- Discomfort: Using a love egg can be uncomfortable or painful if the toy is too large or if they are not properly lubricated.

== Academic research ==
=== Development and design ===
Love eggs are becoming increasingly popular as a type of sex toy that is inserted into the vagina to provide physical stimulation and can be remotely controlled. They are available in various shapes and sizes, with silicone and other body-safe materials being commonly used. The development of these sex toys has been gradual, with early versions being uncomfortable or hard to use, but improvements in design and technology have made them more user-friendly and efficient. Love eggs nowadays can be controlled using wireless technology like Bluetooth, and some models even come equipped with sensors that react to movement, making them ideal for solo or partnered play. As a result, love eggs are versatile and effective for enhancing female sexual pleasure, and their popularity is expected to continue growing in the foreseeable future.

=== Effects ===
The effects of sex toys on women's sexual function, satisfaction, and well-being. The study involved 270 sexually active women who used vibrators or love eggs for eight weeks. The results showed that using sex toys improved sexual function and satisfaction and had a positive impact on women's overall well-being. Women who used vibrators reported greater improvements in sexual function and satisfaction than those who used love eggs. The study concludes that sex toys can be a beneficial tool for women's sexual health and well-being.

=== Sexual health education ===
The study involved 20 Chinese women aged 18-30 who received education on sexual health using love eggs. The participants reported improved knowledge and understanding of their own sexual anatomy and function, as well as increased confidence in their sexual relationships. They also reported a positive attitude towards using love eggs as a tool for sexual health education. The study concludes that love eggs can be a useful tool in promoting sexual health education among women.

== See also ==
- Hitachi Magic Wand
- Vibrator
- Sex toy
