= Wand vibrator =

Massaging device often used for sexual stimulation

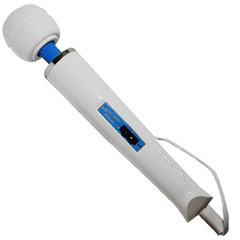
The Hitachi Magic Wand

A wand vibrator is a massaging device which is often also used as a vibrator and a sex toy. It consists of a rounded vibrating ball attached to a handle. The vibration is provided by an electric motor in the handle that rotates an unbalanced flywheel mounted either within the vibrating ball connected to the motor via a flexible coupling, or, less effectively, within the handle itself attached directly to the motor shaft. The Hitachi Magic Wand, available since 1968, is the best-known wand vibrator brand, but many other similar devices exist, including the Doxy wand vibrator made in Britain.

== Operation ==
Wand vibrators can be powered either by batteries or from mains power, with the most powerful devices being typically mains-powered. Many recently designed mains-powered wand vibrators use a plug-in AC adaptor power supply which converts mains voltages down to safer voltage levels.

In addition to use in masturbation, wand vibrators may also be used in orgasm control play, such as in edging or forced orgasm.

In recent years, companies such as Lovense have incorporated Bluetooth and app-based controls into wand vibrator designs.

== Usage ==
They may also be used for medical purposes in the process of vibroejaculation.
