= Mobile Magazine =

- Website type: Blog
- Available in: English
- Owner: Navneet Narula
- Creator: Fabrizio Pilato
- Website: mobilemag.com (archived page listing)
- Commercial: Yes
- Registration: No
- Launched: 2000

Mobile Magazine was an online publication which started in December 2000. The magazine covers mobile technology, including notebook computers, mobile phones, personal digital assistants, MP3 players, digital cameras, mobile gaming, and other portable electronics and computing devices as well as automotive technology.

== Overview ==
Mobile Magazine is a registered trademark with the USPTO and CIPO, in the USA and Canada respectively, and owned by Navneet Narula. In June 2005, "Mobile PC" published by Future Network USA changed their name to "Mobile".

== MobileMagazine.com ==
A cease and desist order on the use of the confusingly similar magazine name and website domain MobileMagazine.com was sent to Future Network USA. The print publication "Mobile" ceased publication as of November 2005 due to undetermined reasons and the domain name MobileMagazine.com was transferred to Pilato Private Consulting. Outstanding subscriptions to Mobile PC were fulfilled by subscriptions to Maximum PC, a sister technical magazine.

== See also ==
- Geekadelphia
