= Erogenous zone =

Area of heightened sensitivity of the body

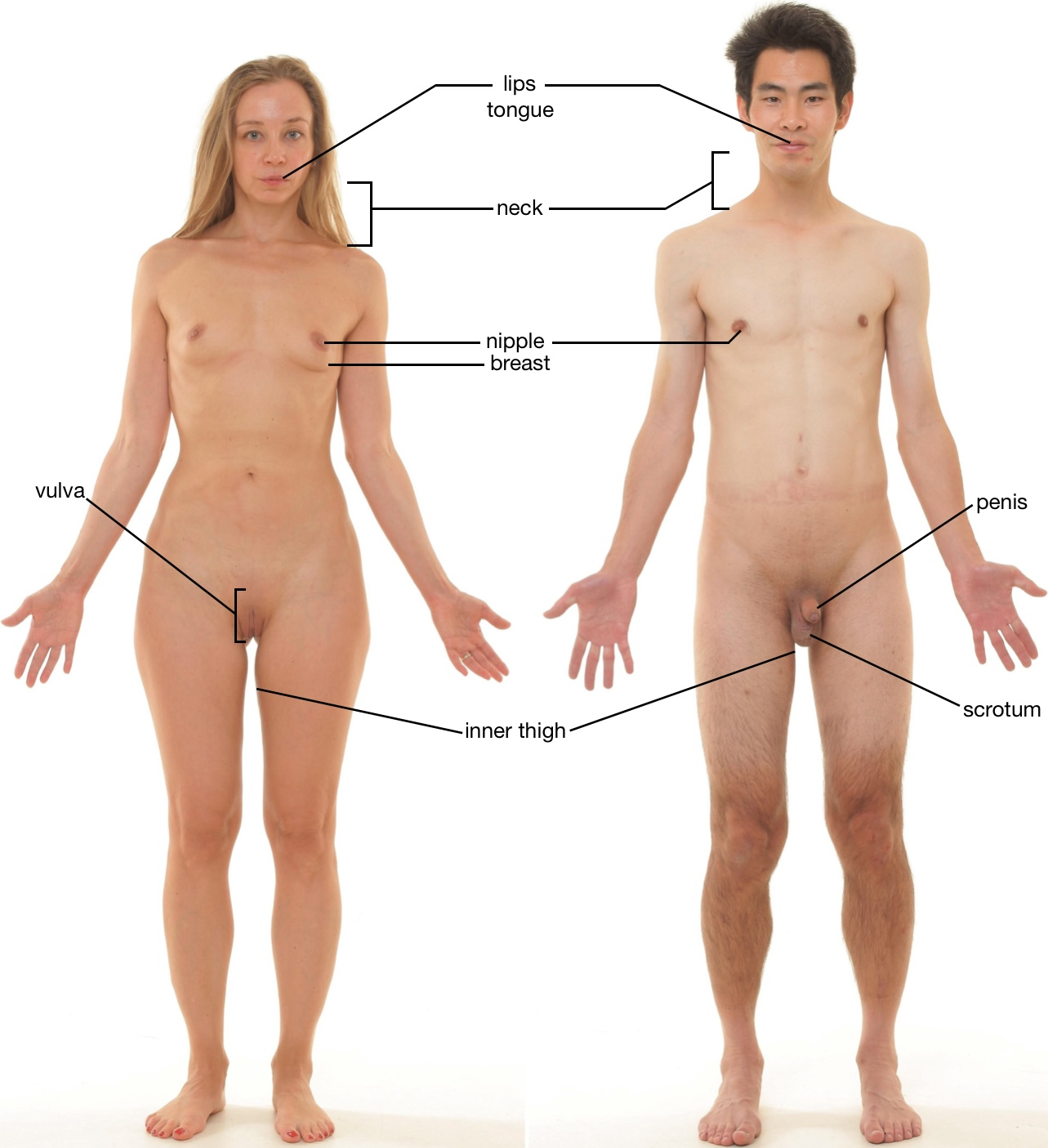
Some human erogenous zones

An erogenous zone (from Greek ἔρως, érōs "love"; and English -genous "producing", from Greek -γενής, -genḗs "born") is an area of the human body that has heightened sensitivity, the stimulation of which may generate a sexual response such as relaxation, sexual fantasies, sexual arousal, and orgasm.

Erogenous zones are located all over the human body; however, the degree of sensitivity varies among individuals and is influenced by the concentration of nerve endings that can provide pleasurable sensations when stimulated. The act of physically touching of another person's erogenous zone is regarded as an act of physical intimacy. Whether a person finds stimulation in these areas to be pleasurable or objectionable depends on a range of factors, including their level of arousal, the circumstances in which it takes place, the cultural context, the nature of the relationship between the partners, and the partners' personal histories.

Erogenous zones may be classified by the type of sexual response that they generate. Many people are gently aroused when their eyelids, eyebrows, temples, shoulders, hands, arms, and hair are subtly touched. Gentle touching or stroking of these zones stimulates a partner during foreplay to increase the arousal level. Additionally, the gentle massage or stroke of the abdominal area, along with kissing or simply touching the navel, can serve as a form of stimulation.

== Classification ==
=== Specific zones ===
Specific zones are associated with sexual response, and include the lips and nipples in addition to areas of the genitals, notably corona of the glans penis, the foreskin, clitoris and perianal skin. These zones have a high density of innervation, and may have an efficiency of wound healing and a capacity to stimulate generalized cerebral arousal.

=== Nonspecific zones ===
In these zones, the skin is similar to normal-haired skin and has the normal high density of nerves and hair follicles. These areas include the sides and back of the neck, the inner arms, the axillae (armpits) and sides of the thorax (chest).

== Genital areas ==
=== Male ===
For males, erogenous zones consist of the glans and the penis itself, along with the scrotum, the perineum, and the anus.

Males may also experience sexual stimulation via the prostate, either from anal sex or massage. The prostate gland may be stimulated from inside the rectum, such as by anal sex, or by applying pressure on the base of the perineum near the anus. Men who report the sensation of prostate stimulation often give descriptions similar to females' accounts of G-spot stimulation.

=== Female ===
For females, parts of the vulva, especially the clitoris, as well as the perineum and anus, are erogenous zones.

While the vagina as a whole is not especially sensitive, its lower third (the area close to the entrance), called "the anterior wall" or "the outer one-third" of the vagina contains the majority of the vaginal nerve endings, making it more sensitive to touch than the inner two-thirds of the vaginal barrel. It has concentrations of the nerve endings that can provide pleasurable sensations during sexual activity when stimulated.

Within the anterior wall of the vagina, there is a patch of ribbed rough tissue which has a texture that is sometimes described as similar to the palate (the roof of a mouth) or a raspberry, and may feel spongy when a woman is sexually aroused. This is the urethral sponge, which may also be the location of an area that some women report is an erogenous zone; this is sometimes called the G-spot. When stimulated, it may lead to sexual arousal, an orgasm, or female ejaculation. The existence of the G-spot and whether or not it is a distinct structure is debated among researchers, as reports of its location vary from woman to woman, it appears to be nonexistent in some women, and scientists commonly believe that it is an extension of the clitoris.

== Head ==
=== Mouth ===
The lips and tongue are sensitive and can be stimulated by kissing and licking. Biting at the lip can also provide stimulus.

=== Neck ===
The neck, clavicle area and the back of the neck are very sensitive, and can be stimulated by licking, kissing or light caressing. Some people also like being bitten gently in these areas, often to the point that a "hickey", or "love-bite" is formed.

=== Ears ===
Some people find whispering or breathing softly in the ear to be pleasurable and relaxing, as well as licking, biting, caressing and/or kissing it especially the area of and behind the earlobe.

== Torso ==
=== Chest ===
The areola and nipple contain pacinian, Vater-Pacini, and genital corpuscles. No Meissner's corpuscles and few organized nerve endings are present. There are concentrations of nerve tissue in the area of ducts and masses of smooth muscle. The hair surrounding the areola adds additional sensory tissue. The mass of smooth muscle and glandular-duct tissue in the nipple and areola block the development of normal dermal nerve networks which are present in other erogenous regions and the development of special end organs. The entire breast has a network of nerve endings, and it has the same number of nerve endings no matter how large the breast is, so that larger breasts may need more stimulation than smaller ones.

Intense nipple stimulation may result in a surge in the production of oxytocin and prolactin which could have a significant effect on the individual's genitals, even to the point that some people of both sexes can achieve orgasm through nipple stimulation alone. Having the chest, breasts and nipples stimulated manually (hands, fingers) or orally (mouth, lips, teeth, tongue) is a pleasurable experience for many people of both sexes.

=== Abdomen and navel ===
Many people find stimulation (kissing, biting, scratching, tickling, caressing) of the abdomen to be pleasurable, especially close to the pubic region. It can cause strong arousal in men and women, in some even stronger than stimulation of the genitals. The navel is one of the many erogenous zones that has heightened sensitivity. In a 1982 study of eroticism in dress entitled "Skin to Skin", Prudence Glynn claimed that the waist symbolized virginity and that it was the first place that a man would touch a woman "when indicating more than a formal courtesy".

The navel and the region below when touched by the finger or the tip of the tongue result in the production of erotic sensations.

== Arms ==
The skin of the arms, and specifically the softer skin of the inner arms and across the creased mid-arm bend covering the ventral side of the elbow, are highly sensitive to manual or oral stimulation. Caressing with fingers or tongue, more vigorous kneading, and butterfly kissing can initiate arousal and, in some cases, induce clitoral/vaginal orgasm or penile ejaculation without direct contact with the latter areas. The mid-arm bend is especially sensitive due to the thinner skin found there, which makes nerve endings more accessible. Arm sensitivity may be reduced or concentrated to a more narrow range by excessive muscularity or obesity on the one hand, or transformed to uncomfortable tenderness by excessive thinness on the other.

== Armpits ==
Some consider the armpits to be an erogenous zone, despite the similarity of the axillae (armpits) to normal-haired skin in both the density of nerves and hair follicles. Exaggerated or anticipated digital (fingers, toes) or oral (mouth, lips, tongue) stimulation is believed to be responsible for the heightened sensual response.

If pheromones exist for humans, they would likely be secreted by a mixture of liquid from the apocrine glands with other organic compounds in the body. George Preti, an organic chemist at the Monell Chemical Senses Center in Philadelphia and Winnefred Cutler of the University of Pennsylvania's psychology department, discovered that women with irregular menstrual cycles became regular when exposed to male underarm extracts. They hypothesized that the only explanation was that underarms contain pheromones, as there was no other explanation for the effects, which mirrored how pheromones affect other mammals.

== Fingers ==
The fingertips have many nerves and are responsive to very light touches, like the brushing of a tongue, light fingernail scratching or teeth stroking. The sides of the fingers are somewhat less sensitive and more ticklish. Both light and firmer touches work well at the junction of the fingers. Human fingertips are the second-most sensitive parts of the body, after the tongue.

== Legs ==
The thighs can be sensitive to touch.

An exaggerated tickle on the back of the legs and knees can also be sensitive for some.

== Feet and toes ==
Because of the concentration of nerve endings in the sole and digits of the human foot—and possibly due to the close proximity between the area of the brain dealing with tactile sensations from the feet and the area dealing with sensations from the genitals—the sensations produced by both the licking of the feet and sucking of toes can be pleasurable to some people. Similarly, massaging the sole of the foot can also produce stimulation. Many people are extremely ticklish in the foot area, especially on the soles. However, the theory surrounding this link has been debated, most notably; Turnbull et al 2014. As for now the proximity between the feet genitalia and the erogenous zones remains solely a hypothesis.

== See also ==
- Biology of romantic love
- Foreplay
- Human sexuality
- Partialism
