= Lovense =

Hong Kong-founded, Singapore-based sex toy manufacturer

- Type: Private
- Industry: Sex industry
- Founded: 2010
- Founder: Dan Liu
- Headquarters: Singapore
- Area served: Worldwide
- Products: Sex toys
- Website: www.lovense.com

Lovense is a Singapore-based sex tech company specializing in the development of remotely controlled sex toys and pleasure products, as well as accompanying software. Lovense is also known for its interconnected devices, an app ecosystem, and integrations across creator and cam platforms.

== History ==
Lovense was founded by Dan Liu in 2010. The company was inspired by teledildonics and long-distance relationships.

In 2013, the first app-based sex toys, Max (male masturbator) and Nora (rabbit vibrator), were launched. In 2014, it integrated app controlling.

In 2016, Lush vibrator was launched with the help of S$100,000 raised on the crowdfunding website IndieGogo, and an oscillating G-spot massager. In the same year, it also partnered up with VirtualRealPorn.

In 2017, Lovense released 5 more devices, Hush, Ambi, Domi, Edge, and Osci. In 2018, it introduced a USB Bluetooth adapter to allow its devices to connect to Windows computers.

In 2019, the company upgraded three of its previous devices and relaunched them as Lush 2, Max 2, and Osci 2. In 2020, it launched Domi 2 and limited edition Mission.

In January 2021, the company announced "digital orgies" feature, where up to 100 participants can join via the Lovense app. In early February 2021, Lovense partnered up with CamSoda to launch a vibrating cock ring, Diamo. The ring was also included in an Elden Ring mod. It also launched its small-sized panty vibrator, Ferri, in the same year.

In late 2021, the company launched its "glans massager", called Gush. The massager is compatible with specific integrated games like WildLife Demo. Apart from Gush, 5 more devices were launched, Edge 2, Lush 3, Diamo, Dolce, and Hyphy.

In early 2022, it partnered with SexLikeReal to launch a compatible male vibrator called Calor. It also launched its Sex Machine.

In 2023, Lovense released 6 new products, Solace, Kraken, Lapis, Vulse, Ridge, and Lovense Webcam.

In mid-2023, the company introduced its "Advanced Lovense ChatGPT Pleasure Companion," which could narrate the customized story and make the toy vibrate along with the erotic or romantic tale.

In February 2024, Lovense unveiled Apple Vision Pro-compatible sex toys, which can enhance users' immersion and interactive experiences with the Vision Pro headset through the Lovense App.

In March 2024, Lovense announced a new clitoral sex toy, Tenera 2. Within this year, the company also upgraded three of the previous devices and relaunched as Mini Sex Machine, Mission 2, and Solace Pro, which uses the new Lovense AI Sync technology to accurately and consistently sync toy movements to every adult video.

In May 2024, the company was awarded nearly $20 million in damages after winning a series of intellectual property lawsuits surrounding its Lush series of interactive vibrators.

In 2024, Lovense trademarked its slogan, "Closing the Distance." Later in December, it released Osci 3. In January 2025, the company participated in the Consumer Electronics Show (CES) in Las Vegas, showcasing the Lovense Solace Pro, Mission 2, and Lush 4. The interactive booth highlighted the Lovense's innovative capabilities, including teledildonics, game synchronization, and music synchronization.

In 2025, Lovense released 3 new products, Lush 4 and Lush Mini the latest offering from its Bluetooth-controlled G-spot egg vibrator series, Gush 2 and Lovense Webcam 2.

At CES 2026, Lovense introduced an AI-powered companion robot.

In April 2026, Lovense released Velvo, the world's first patented rolling bead rabbit vibrator.

== Devices and software ==
As of 2024, the company has officially released more than 25 devices and software, including Lovense Remote App, Connect App, Cam Extension, and Lovense API. The devices support the Alexa voice assistant. The toys also integrate with cam services, allowing them to react to tips that streamers receive.

Lovense toys integrate with several adult video games, including 3DXChat, WildLife Demo, and Lovense Mirror Life.

In 2021, Lovense conducted a 24-hour Twitter Orgy where participants from across the world could experience the same vibration patterns in real time.

In June 2024, Lovense announced the streaming support integration with OnlyFans and became the only live streaming software on OnlyFans that supports tip-activated toy vibrations. In the same year, it conducted another Twitter Orgy with over 8,500 participants worldwide to enjoy the same vibrating moment together.

Lovense's annual global orgy event on X has run since 2018, drawing more than 61,000 participants in 2025.

In June 2026, Lovense announced a short drama sync feature in its ecosystem.

In June-July 2026, Lovense launched Match Intensity, turning World Cup interest excitement into real-time sensory feedback in its ecosystem.

In July 2026, Lovense Remote App, a part of the Lovense ecosystem, received a major update. It was expanded from a purely utility-based tool to a platform combining social and functional features. Version 8.0 is the most recent version as of July 2026.

== Security and privacy concerns ==
In 2016, The Internet of Dongs Project reported email enumeration and disclosure vulnerabilities in Lovense's app. The company implemented remediation measures and became a "trusted partner vendor" with the Internet of Dongs disclosure program.

In 2017, users discovered that the Lovense Android app was recording audio during usage sessions, as well as saving files locally without user knowledge. The company called this a "minor software bug" and released an update to address the issue. Lovense stated that no audio data was sent to its servers.

In September 2023, security researcher Krissy reported critical vulnerabilities including account takeover capabilities and an HTTP endpoint (`/api/getUserNameByEmailV2`) that could convert emails to usernames and vice versa. Lovense claimed the issues were fixed and paid a $350 bug bounty.

In March 2025, security researchers BobDaHacker, Eva, and Rebane independently reported vulnerabilities including a different method for converting usernames to email addresses via XMPP manipulation and the same account takeover flaw, with assistance from The Internet of Dongs Project for responsible disclosure.

Both issues were fixed within 48 hours on July 30, 2025.

The founder of the company, Dan Liu, in an official statement, claimed that there was no data breach, unlawful access, or misuse.

== Awards and recognition ==
Lovense has been recognized widely in the sex industry and has been reviewed by many critics.

- Forbes Vices Awards 2020 – Disruptive Innovator
- Altporn Awards 2021 from Altporn.net – Best Tech Toy (Lovense Ferri)
- XBIZ Europa Awards 2021 – Sex Toy Product of the Year (Lovense Ferri)
- XBIZ Honors Awards 2022 – International Pleasure Products Company of the Year
- AVN "O" Awards 2024 – Outstanding App-Controlled Product (Lush 3)
- XBIZ Best Male Pleasure Product 2025 – Solace Pro
- AskMen Dating Awards 2025 – Best Distance Toy (Lush 4)
- XBIZ Best Product Innovation 2026 – Spinel
- CES Reviewed Awards 2026 – Health and fitness – AI Companion Doll
