= Masturbation (disambiguation) =

Masturbation is the sexual stimulation of one's own genitals for sexual arousal.

Masturbation may also refer to:

== Film and television ==
- Masturbation: Putting the Fun Into Self-Loving (2002), written by J. T. Tepnapa, American writer, producer, actor, and director.
- "Masturbation: Guys Vs. Girls" (2017), video by Brittany Ashley, American actor, writer, and comedian.
- "Masturbation" (1999), episode from Love in the 21st Century written by Paul Cornell.
- Masturbation (2003) episode section explained by Bo in Dutch: Neuken doe je zo!, lit. 'That's How You Fuck', Dutch sex education.

== Literature ==
- German: Onanie: weder Laster noch Krankheit, lit. 'Masturbation: neither wicked nor illness' (1929), book by Max Hodann, German physician, eugenicist, sex educator and Marxist.
- Masturbation: The History of a Great Terror (1998), book by Jean Stengers and Anne van Neck.
- "Masturbation" (1958), article in Pastoral Psychology by J. Kenneth Grider, Nazarene Christian theologian.
- Masturbation (1973), chapter section from My Secret Garden, fantasies compiled by Nancy Friday, American.
- Masturbation: The Difficult One (1973), chapter from The Brand New Monty Python Bok, by Monty Python, British comedy.
- "Masturbation: A Touchy Subject" (2005), chapter in Making Sense of Abstinence by Bill Taverner; Sue Montfort.
- Masturbation (1970), a fictional film in the plot of The Magic Garden of Stanley Sweetheart, a semi-autobiographical film and novel written by Robert T. Westbrook, American writer.

== Music and comedy ==
- Masturbation 1990, album by Infection, a project of Nike Borzov, Russian singer and musician.
- "Masturbation (Interlude)" (1998), song from Kima, Keisha, and Pam, by Total, American R&B girl group.
- "Masturbation" (2003) comedy track from Skanks for the Memories... by Dave Attell, American stand-up comedian, actor and writer.

== Other uses ==
- Team Masturbation, wrestling team defeated by the Kings of Wrestling.
- Masturbation (c. 1331 to 1509), sculpture on the facade of Hôtel de Ville, Saint-Quentin, France.
- International Masturbation Month, an observance during the month of may.

== See also ==
- The Big Book of Masturbation (2003), book by Martha Cornog, American.
- Concerning Specific Forms of Masturbation (1922), essay by Wilhelm Reich, Austrian doctor of medicine and a psychoanalyst.
- An Essay on Masturbation (1980), chapter by Alan Soble in The Philosophy of Sex: Contemporary Readings.
- Ode to Masturbation (2016), poetry by Ocean Vuong, Vietnamese American poet, essayist, and novelist.
- 20 Songs Perfect for Your Masturbation Playlist by Cosmopolitan, including the song, "Joan of Arc" (2018) by Little Mix, British girl group.
- "Masturbation Blues" (1994), song from Krymplings by Krymplings, Swedish punk.
- "The Masturbation Session" (1995), song by GG Allin, American punk rock.
- "Intro (Music for Masturbation)" (2004), song from If You Can't Beat 'Em, Bite 'Em by Weird War, indie rock.
