= Honey Lee Cottrell =

American photographer and filmmaker

- Born: January 16, 1946; Astoria, Oregon
- Died: September 21, 2015 (aged 69); Santa Cruz, California
- Education: San Francisco State University
- Occupations: Photographer; filmmaker; activist

Honey Lee Cottrell (January 16, 1946 – September 21, 2015) was a lesbian photographer and filmmaker who lived most of her life in San Francisco, California. Her papers are part of the Human Sexuality Collection at Cornell University Library.

== Early life and education ==
Cottrell was born in Astoria, Oregon. She was raised in Michigan, moving to San Francisco in 1968. She learned photography in her twenties and in her thirties using her first camera, a 35 mm Nikkormat, and went to school at San Francisco State University, earning a B.A. in film studies. She funded her early artistic work by serving as a waiter on cruise ships, earning a certificate as a merchant seaman.

== Career ==
She studied in San Francisco at the National Sex Forum and was a volunteer switchboard operator at San Francisco Sex Information.

She began exhibiting her photography in the mid-1970s in San Francisco, becoming well known for her photography of women. She collaborated with other lesbian photographers, including Tee Corinne. In the 1976 documentary film We Are Ourselves, Cottrell and Tee Corinne describe their relationship to filmmaker Ann Hershey.

Cottrell collaborated with Joani Blank on the 1978 path-breaking book "I Am My Lover," published by Blank's Down There Press. Blank edited the book, pairing Cottrell's photographs of individual women with these women's written reflections on masturbation and on learning to give themselves pleasure. Cottrell's first film, Sweet Dreams (1979) included Pat Califia and was produced by the National Sex Forum. Sweet Dreams is described by documentary film critics as part of a tradition of the "feminist autobiographic art of masturbation demonstration". The film also is described as ground-breaking in its combination of second-wave cultural feminism and lesbian erotica.

Through the 1980s and 1990s, Cottrell worked as contributing photographer for On Our Backs, a lesbian sex magazine edited by Susie Bright. She was a member of the team since day one, and integral to its success. She was credited in her obituary as being one of the "core four" to give On Our Backs the style and cultural impact it had. Her work became influential in representations of lesbian sex and feminist lesbian portraiture. Along with Corinne and later, Susie Bright and other lovers and artistic collaborators, Cottrell strategically positioned sexually explicit photography as part of lesbian culture and as populist sex education. Her lesbian s/m images in particular, in works such as the SAMOIS book Coming to Power, were considered controversially pornographic by feminist critics. She worked for Fatale Media as a consultant, a film company known for getting the first lesbian porn film into the Frameline Film Festival in 1985. Her work was also featured in The Blatant Image, Coming to Power, Sinister Wisdom, and Nothing But the Girl.

Cottrell was a co-founder of the San Francisco Lesbian and Gay History Project, working with many other artists, writers, historians and cultural critics.

Cottrell died at age 69 in Santa Cruz, California, due to pancreatic cancer.

== Bibliography ==
- Blank, Joani and Honey Lee Cottrell, editors. I Am My Lover. Burlingame, CA: Down There Press, 1978.
- Sinister Wisdom #7. Lincoln, NE: Sinister Wisdom, 1978.
- The Blatant Image: A Magazine of Feminist Photography, vol. 1, 1981. Sunny Valley, OR.
- The Blatant Image: A Magazine of Feminist Photography, vol. 2. 1982. Sunny Valley, OR.
- SAMOIS. Coming to Power. Boston: Alyson, 1981.
- On Our Backs, numerous issues. San Francisco: Blush Productions.
- Taylor, Jill with photographs by Honey Lee Cottrell. A Dyke's Bike Repair Handbook. Los Angeles: Clothespin Fever Press, 1990.
- Bright, Susie and Jill Posener, eds. Nothing But the Girl: The Blatant Lesbian Image. London and New York: Cassell, 1996.

== Films ==
- Sweet Dreams. Director and camera. 1979.
