= Joani Blank =

American sex educator, author, and entrepreneur (1937–2016)

- Born: July 4, 1937
- Died: August 6, 2016 (aged 79)
- Occupations: Entrepreneur; writer; videographer; sex educator
- Notable work: Founded Good Vibrations, Down There Press and designed the Butterfly vibrator

Joani Blank (July 4, 1937 – August 6, 2016) was an American feminist sex educator, entrepreneur, and author in the field of sexuality. She is the founder of Good Vibrations and Down There Press. She used publishing, her sex store, and other endeavors to promote sex-positive feminism. Her papers are part of the Human Sexuality Collection at Cornell University Library.

== Career ==
Blank founded Down There Press, a publisher of sex-positive-related books, in 1975. In 1977, she opened Good Vibrations, the second feminist sex toy business in the United States (the first having been Eve's Garden in New York City, which was founded by Dell Williams in 1974). The idea to create Good Vibrations stemmed from her work with sex therapist Lonnie Barbach, in which the pair worked with women who had difficulty reaching orgasm. Prior to her opening Good Vibrations, she was hired at the University of California, San Francisco to screen candidates who had difficulties achieving orgasm. This study influenced her business model for Good Vibrations. Lynn Comella wrote that Blank turned "her small vibrator shop into a sexual resource center for anyone who might wander in. She felt that talking about sex should be as casual as talking about the weather; she also believed that sexual information was a birthright and that no one should be made to feel ashamed or embarrassed for wanting more pleasure in their life."

Blank collaborated with photographer Honey Lee Cottrell on I Am My Lover, and Down There Press published it in 1978. In this book, she paired Cottrell's photographs of individual women with the subject's written reflections on masturbation and on learning to give themselves pleasure. It joined Our Bodies, Ourselves (1971) and Betty Dodson's Liberating Masturbation: A Meditation on Self Love (1974) as second wave feminist books aiming to educate women about their bodies and empower them to have a positive sexual life.

Blank was one of the first volunteers at San Francisco Sex Information and has served on the board of directors of the Society for the Scientific Study of Sexuality. She is also known for her inventions of the Butterfly vibrator and Titattoos (now Intimate Art Tattoos).

== Personal life ==
Blank had one daughter, Amika, and three grandchildren. Blank lived in cohousing from 1992 until her death and served on the board of the Cohousing Association of the United States. She spent many years in Doyle Street Cohousing in Emeryville, California, and co-founded her final home community, Swan's Market Cohousing in Oakland, California. Blank volunteered her time to social justice issues such as prison reform and economic equality. She held a master's degree in public health education and remained active in the field of sexuality.

Blank died of pancreatic cancer on August 6, 2016, less than two months after her diagnosis.

== Books ==
- Contributing author, That Takes Ovaries!: Bold Females and Their Brazen Acts, Three Rivers Press, 2002
- Editor, Still Doing It: Men and Women Over Sixty Write About Their Sexuality, Down There Press, 2000
- Co-author (with Ann Whidden), Good Vibrations: The New Complete Guide to Vibrators, Down There Press, 2000 (see also 1976, below)
- Editor, I Am My Lover: Women Pleasure Themselves, Down There Press, 1997
- Editor, First Person Sexual: Women and Men Write About Self-Pleasuring, Down There Press, 1996
- Editor, Femalia, Down There Press, 1993
- A Kid's First Book About Sex, Down There Press, 1993
- I Am My Lover, Down There Press, 1978.
- The Playbook for Kids About Sex, Down There Press, 1978
- The Playbook for Men About Sex, Down There Press, 1976
- Good Vibrations: Being a Treatise on the Use of Machines in the Indolent Indulgence of Erotic Pleasure-Seeking Together with Important Hints on the Acquisition, Care, and Utilization of Said Machines and Much More about the Art and Science of Buzzing Off, Down There Press, 1976
- The Playbook for Women About Sex, Down There Press, 1975

== Films ==
- Orgasm: Faces of Ecstasy, Blank Tapes and Libido Films, 2004 (with Jack Hafferkamp and Marianna Beck).
- Carol Queen's Great Vibrations: An Explicit Guide to Vibrators, Blank Tapes, ~1997.
