= Masturbate-a-thon =

Charity event in which participants masturbate

Masturbate-a-thon logo, based on an ancient Roman good luck charm

The Masturbate-a-thon is an event in which participants masturbate to raise money for charity and increase the public awareness and dispel the shame and taboos that exist about this form of sexual activity. From 1998 to 2003, the Masturbate-a-thon raised around $25,000 for women's health initiatives and HIV prevention, education and treatment organizations, and has contributed to debates about safer sex and alternative safe methods of sexual expression. The event awards several honors for those who raise the most money as well as for multiple orgasms and endurance.

== History ==
Masturbate-a-thon Logo used by 2006 London event

In May 1995, San Francisco–based sex toy shop Good Vibrations declared May to be "Masturbation Month". Since then, it has encouraged people to get sponsors as a fundraiser for charities with a sex-positive focus.

London hosted Europe's first "masturbate-a-thon" on 5 August 2006. It aims to remove the taboo and shame associated with masturbation. Hundreds of persons raised money for the charity Terrence Higgins Trust and the sexual- and reproductive-health agency Marie Stopes International. The Masturbate-a-thon, also called "Wank-a-Thon," was recorded by ZigZagProductions of London as part of an international documentary of the event. However, plans to broadcast this on Channel 4 as part of its Wank Week series were abandoned, including programming from Europe's fetish and leather week.

In 2009, Masanobu Sato won the Masturbate-a-thon held by the Center of Sex and Culture in San Francisco after masturbating for nine hours and thirty-three minutes.

In 2012, China's first masturbation contest was held in Shenzhen, China in observance of World AIDS day. The event's organizers explained that the contest aims to promote masturbation as the safest means of sex and as an effective means for avoiding HIV infection.

Montreal's first Masturbate-a-thon (aka "Wankfest") took place on 4 May 2013. The event raised money for the charity Head and Hands, a youth sex education and outreach organization, and Sexploreum, an adult education group dedicated to encouraging playfulness with sexuality. Masturbate-a-thon 3 in 2014 was cancelled due to lack of registrations.

== See also ==
- National Masturbation Day
- Wank Week
