= Wank Week =

Cancelled television programming

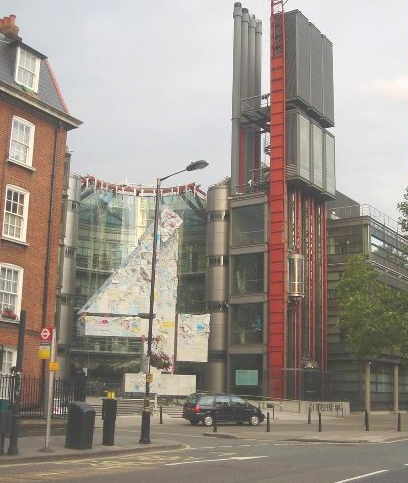
Channel 4 Headquarters

Wank Week was a controversial season of television programming that was due to be broadcast in the United Kingdom by Channel 4, expected to consist of a series of three documentary programmes about masturbation. However, plans to broadcast it in March 2007 came under public attack (from senior television figures), and the planned broadcasts were pulled amid claims of declining editorial standards and controversy over the channel's public service broadcasting credentials. While Wank Week itself was cancelled, the films it was meant to showcase were left open to be broadcast at a later date.

== Commissioning and programming ==
The season was commissioned by James Hindle, the channel's factual entertainment commissioning editor, and announced in July 2006. It was to consist of three films broadcast in the 11pm slot, headlined by a documentary on mass public masturbation. This kind of programming was not unprecedented: the Channel had previously screened a 'Penis Week', reportedly described by MacKenzie as a "success" in a Guardian article. He continued on the subject of Wank Week, "we feel this is exactly the type of provocative and mischievous programming that Channel 4 should be covering in the 11pm slot". In the United Kingdom, the 11pm slot is considered post-watershed, defined by the regulator Ofcom in the Broadcasting Code as later than 9pm (although transition to more adult material "must not be unduly abrupt at the watershed or after the time when children are particularly likely to be listening" according to section 1.6). This allows the broadcasting of more sexually explicit content.

Masturbate-a-Thon logo

The first show to be announced centred on a Masturbate-a-thon held in Clerkenwell, London in August 2006. This was a public mass masturbation event organised to raise money for the sexual health charity Marie Stopes International. A press release from Zig-Zag, the independent production company behind the recording of the event, promised that the film would reveal "if the only things allowed to be stiff in Britain are upper lips". The programme's working title was Wank-a-thon.

A week later, plans for an as yet unnamed second documentary about compulsive male masturbators were announced, to be produced by the independent company Spun Gold. The film was to be an hour long and focus on men trying to cut down excessive masturbatory habits of up to twenty times a day, using methods developed in the United States. In September 2006, the final film in the series was announced. Entitled Masturbation For Girls, it was also to be produced by Spun Gold, and focus on female masturbation. It was to feature the sex educationalist Betty Dodson, although the format had yet not been finalised. It was reported after the postponement of their airing that the second and third films were to be entitled I Can't Stop Wanking and Masturbation for Women respectively.

== Controversy and cancellation ==
Wank Week was criticised in the prestigious James MacTaggart Memorial Lecture at the 2006 Edinburgh International Television Festival on 25 August, only a month after Channel 4's initial announcement. Charles Allen, the outgoing Chief Executive of Channel 4's commercial rival ITV, attacked Channel 4 for deterioration of output and adopting a "begging" approach to finances in the run-up to terrestrial digital switchover (requesting subsidies for public service output while pursuing a path of commercialism). Wank Week's mention came as part of a critique of programming that Channel 4 was counting towards its "educational" content. Allen joked that he was expecting Wank Week to be included, "but that could be a hard one to pull off even for Channel 4." The pun was subsequently repeated in the press.

Criticisms of Wank Week were echoed later in 2006 by Sir Jeremy Isaacs, the first Chief Executive of Channel 4, in an article for Prospect magazine. Isaacs argued that Channel 4's increased commercialisation led to a targeting of the 16- to 34-year-old audience, and the subsequent "obsession with adolescent transgression and sex" could be seen in programming such as Designer Vaginas, The World's Biggest Penis and Wank Week.

Although these public attacks led to reports of concern in Channel 4 management, postponement of Wank Week did not take place until early February 2007, only a month before its planned screening. There had been a major racism controversy during January's Celebrity Big Brother contest, and the launch of Wank Week raised the prospect of further embarrassment at a critical time: Ofcom was reviewing the channel's finances ahead of the digital switchover, with the continued nature of Channel 4's existence as a state-owned but advertisement-funded public service broadcaster at stake. Broadcast magazine reported that several senior figures at Channel 4 had felt uncomfortable about Wank Week, including deputy chairman David Puttnam and chairman Luke Johnson, although they had originally not intended to formally object. The atmosphere following the Celebrity Big Brother racism row was suggested to have influenced the decision.

According to the media section of The Guardian, the films commissioned for Wank Week were likely to be broadcast at a later date, but probably not as part of a dedicated season of programming, and certainly not under the Wank Week banner. Dan Wootton, senior reporter at Broadcast, criticised the decision, calling it "wimpy". Contrasting it with the way that Channel 4 executives had been prepared to defend Celebrity Big Brother, he accused them of acting hypocritically.

== See also ==
- Masturbate-a-thon
- National Masturbation Day
- No Nut November
- Sex-positive movement
- Shark Week
