= Babeland =

Sex toy boutique

Coordinates: 47.61396°N 122.322983°W

- Babeland logo

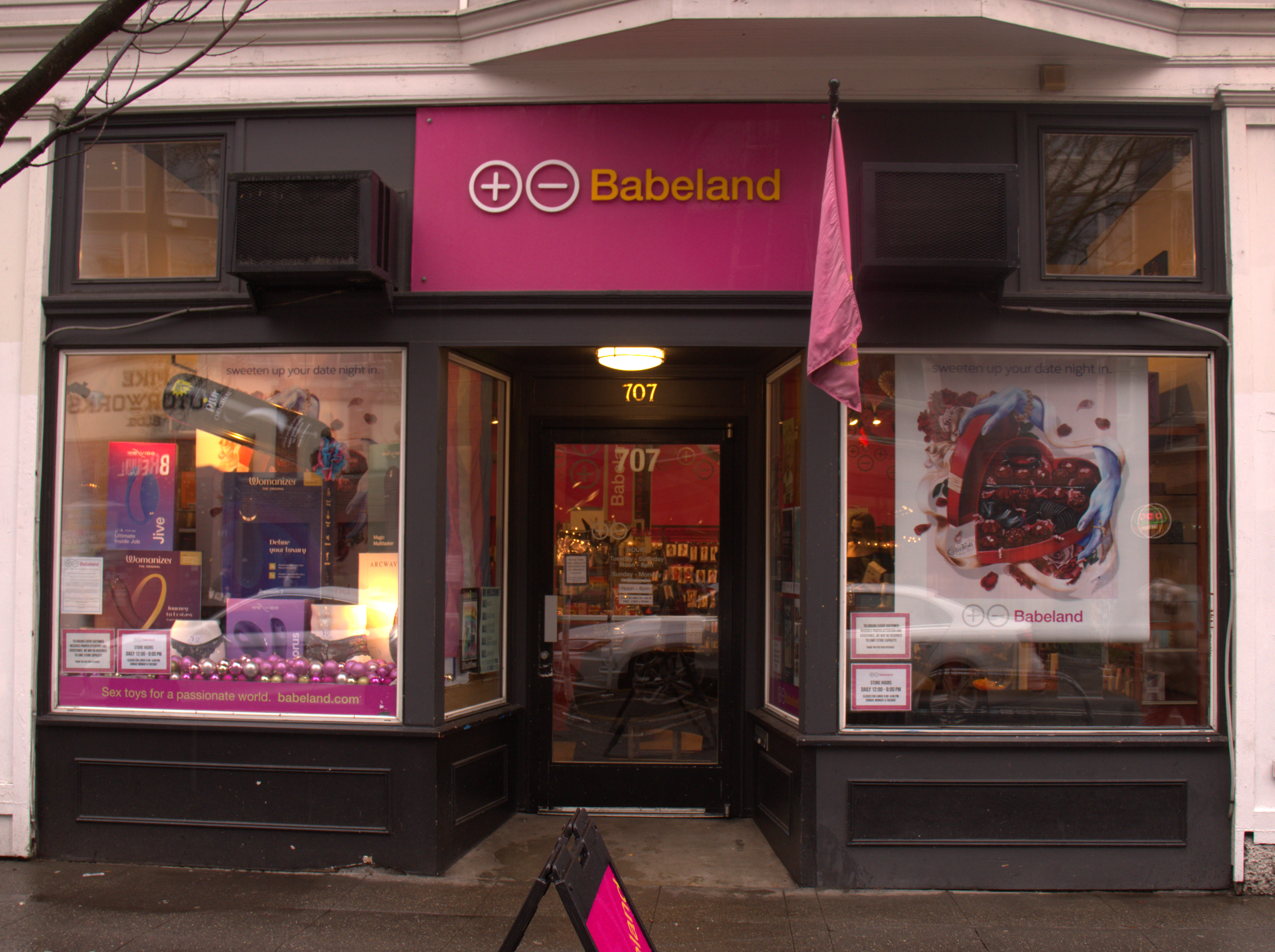
- Babeland in Seattle (2023)
- Industry: Specialty Retail
- Founded: 1993; 33 years ago in Seattle, Washington, US
- Founders: Claire Cavanah, Rachel Venning
- Headquarters: Seattle, Washington, USA
- Parent: Good Vibrations
- Website: www.babeland.com

Babeland, until 2005 known as Toys in Babeland, is a sex toy boutique offering erotic toys, books and pornographic films. LGBTQ-owned Babeland has an online store and four retail stores (in Seattle, Brooklyn, and two in Manhattan).

== History ==
Claire Cavanah and Rachel Venning founded Toys in Babeland in 1993, in response to the lack of women-friendly sex shops in Seattle. The store's name is a spoonerism of Babes in Toyland, a feminist riot grrrl punk band and Babes in Toyland, the title of a 1934 Laurel & Hardy film. Committed to offering information and encouragement to women who wanted to explore their sexuality, the owners focused on selling quality sex toys in a boutique-like setting.

In 1995, Toys in Babeland started its mail order business with a small print catalog based out of their Seattle store. Shortly thereafter, in 1996, the Toys in Babeland website followed. In 1998, the owners opened their second Toys in Babeland store, in New York City, on the Lower East Side of Manhattan. In 2003, they opened another New York store, in SoHo. In 2005, Babeland debuted its fourth store in Los Angeles, which has since closed. In 2008, Babeland opened a new location in Park Slope, Brooklyn, making a total of three stores in New York City.

In 2003, Venning and Cavanah published Sex Toys 101: The Ultimate Guide to Choosing and Using Sex Toys.

In 2008, Babeland ran a promotion in which they gave away a free sex toy to anyone who voted in that November's election.

In January 2010, Venning and Cavanah, in association with Jessica Vitkus, published a second book: Moregasm: Babeland's Guide to Mind-Blowing Sex

In May 2016, the Babeland stores in New York City voted to be represented by the Retail, Wholesale and Department Store Union, becoming the first U.S. sex shops to be unionized.

In August 2017, Babeland was sold to rival sex shop Good Vibrations. Babeland continues to operate as a separate brand.

== Notable employees ==
Queer erotica author Dena Hankins worked at Babeland as Web Operations Manager from 1998 to 2006.

== Awards ==
Babeland has received numerous awards over the years, including a 2006 Zagat's Survey award as "the best shopping experience in New York." In 2014, it was voted "Best Place to Buy Sex Toys" by The Village Voice, Voted "Best Sex Shop" of 2016 & 2017 by the Best of Seattle 2016 Reader Poll in Seattle Weekly

== Books published by Babeland ==
- Venning, Rachel & Cavanah, Claire (2003). Sex Toys 101: A Playfully Uninhibited Guide. Touchstone. ISBN 9780743243513.
- Venning, Rachel; Cavanah, Claire & Vitkus, Jessica (2010). Moregasm: Babeland's Guide to Mind-Blowing Sex (Paperback ed.). Avery. ISBN 9781583333723.
