= The Big Book of Masturbation =

2003 nonfiction book by Martha Cornog

The Big Book of Masturbation: From Angst to Zeal
- Author: Martha Cornog
- Language: English
- Publisher: Down There Press
- Publication date: 2003
- Pages: 338
- ISBN: 9780940208292

The Big Book of Masturbation: From Angst to Zeal is a nonfiction book about masturbation by Martha Cornog. It was published in 2003 by Down There Press.
