= David B. Goodstein =

American publisher (1932–1985)

David B. Goodstein (June 6, 1932 – June 22, 1985) was the publisher of The Advocate and an influential spokesperson on behalf of LGBT people and causes.

== Early life and career ==
Goodstein was born in Denver, Colorado in 1932. He graduated from Cornell University in 1954, spent two years in the United States Army, and went on to earn an LL.B. from Columbia Law School. After practicing criminal law in New York City briefly, he became a Wall Street investment banker, co-founding Compufund, one of the first mutual funds to use statistical analysis with computers. He became active in social causes, serving on the boards of the Grand Street Settlement and United Settlement Houses of New York. He was also an amateur horseman, owner and exhibitor of American Saddlebred horses, and avid art collector.

== LGBT activism ==
Goodstein moved to California in 1971 to work for a bank, but was fired once a bank executive learned that Goodstein was gay. He became active in politics and the gay rights movement, going public with his sexuality. He was instrumental in the passage of the Consenting Adult Sex Bill, helped found the Gay Rights National Lobby in 1976, and co-founded Concerned Voters of California to help defeat the effort to ban LGBTQ teachers from public schools in 1978. Goodstein founded and chaired the Whitman-Radclyffe Foundation for LGBTQ individuals dealing with drug abuse and also built a national network of gay political fundraisers. He became the first openly gay appointee by Governor Jerry Brown after joining his Advisory Council on Economic Development. He also served on the National Democratic Finance Council, California State Democratic Central Committee, and Hunger Project Council.

Goodstein's approach to LGBTQ political activism was controversial in its own time for being class-based, narrow in its goals, and exclusionary, as well as projecting "a 'respectable' bourgeois image." According to historian Robert O. Self, Goodstein was among activists attacked as "a small cabal of elitists" by others seeking LGBTQ rights in 1973 for allegedly grounding their politics among wealthy lesbians and gay men who were "insulated from ordinary homosexuals." He sought to limit the breadth of inclusion in a campaign for federal gay rights by seeking "to suppress 'gay spoilers'" by keeping them off broadcast media.

In 1975, Goodstein purchased The Advocate, growing it to be the most widely circulated and influential gay news magazine in the country. He was owner and president of Liberation Publications, which owned The Advocate and distributed other publications. With Rob Eichberg, he also launched a series of LGBTQ personal growth seminars called the "Advocate Experience," which was shortened later to "The Experience."

Goodstein worked to establish the Human Sexuality Collection at Cornell University Library, one of the most important research collections of its kind. Goodstein was portrayed by Howard Rosenman in the 2008 film Milk about Harvey Milk.

Goodstein died at age 53 at Sharp Memorial Hospital, San Diego in 1985 from complications related to bowel cancer. He was named one of the "100 Most Notable Cornellians" in 2003.
