= Dena Hankins =

American novelist and short story author (born 1975)

- Touring with Blue Water Dreams, 2014
- Born: December 1, 1975 (age 50)
- Education: University of Washington
- Occupations: Novelist and short story author; Sailor
- Writing career
- Genres: LGBTQ Romance and Erotica
- Website: denahankins.net

Dena Hankins (born December 1, 1975) is an American novelist and short story author, best known for queer and transgender erotic romance. Her short stories have been published in several erotica anthologies, including Best Women's Erotica of the Year, Volume 8 edited by Rachel Kramer Bussel. Her non-fiction articles about sailing, electric motors for sailboats, and DIY boat repair have been published by the trusted British magazine Practical Boat Owner and she edited several editions of the boater's cruising guides published by The Waterway Guide.

Hankins' fiction is part of a growing trend to feature queer romance that is outside of the "issues" books that were once more common. Publishers Weekly called her novel Blue Water Dreams, featuring a love story between a queer cisgender woman and a transgender man, an "exciting debut", and Lambda Literary Review included Blue Water Dreams among "new and noteworthy" LGBT books. Literary blog Out in Print: Queer Book Reviews chose Blue Water Dreams for inclusion in its "Best of 2014" top ten list. The American Library Association found her book to be "well within the expectations of the romance genre, albeit with an aypical male lead."

Hankins' second novel, Heart of the Lilikoi, features an erotic romance between a cisgender lesbian construction contractor and a masculine genderqueer solar energy scientist in the midst of sabotage, murder, and the Hawaiian sovereignty movement. Publishers Weekly called Heart of the Lilikoi an "intriguing contemporary", "strong and satisfying" with "intensely vivid erotic encounters".

Lysistrata Cove, published in September 2016, is a romance within a tale of high seas adventure while examining questions of artistic autonomy within the U.S. music industry. Liz Baudler of Windy City Times noted that "author Dena Hankins has mastered the art of casual inclusion" and said, "If Neal Stephenson, author of such sci-fi classics as Snow Crash and Cryptonomicon, wrote BDSM erotica, tonally it would feel a lot like Lysistrata Cove." It includes a BDSM relationship between a trans masculine sea captain and a polyamorous queer superstar chanteuse.

== Personal life ==
Hankins studied English literature at the University of Washington Seattle, graduating with a bachelor's degree in 1998. Before launching her writing career Hankins worked for eight years as a sex educator with Babeland, a Seattle-based feminist sex toy store. In 2001 she was featured on HBO's Real Sex #26 as a demo model for a Babeland cunnilingus workshop.

In 1999 she and her partner, photographer James Lane, bought a sailboat and began living aboard full-time. The couple sailed from Seattle to San Francisco in 2000-2001, then across the Pacific Ocean to Hawaii in 2006. After living in Kerala, India, they returned to the United States to purchase a new sailing vessel and traveled the East Coast of the United States from Virginia to Maine. After replacing their diesel engine with an electric motor, they sailed to Bermuda, the Azores, Madeira, and the Canary Islands. Hankins chronicles her "Around the World in 80 Years" traveling adventures as well as pieces from her growing body of literary work at her blog, Sovereign Nations.

== Bibliography ==
Novels:

- Blue Water Dreams published by Bold Strokes Books (September 2014)
- Heart of the Lilikoi published by Bold Strokes Books (October 2015)
- Lysistrata Cove published by Bold Strokes Books (October 2016)

Short Story Fiction:

- "The Battle of Blair Mountain" in Thunder of War, Lightning of Desire: Lesbian Military Historical Erotica, edited by Sacchi Green (October 2015)
- "Cooling Down, Heating Up" in Love Burns Bright: A Lifetime of Lesbian Romance, and in Best Lesbian Romance of the Year 2015 both edited by Radclyffe (October 2013/February 2015)
- "Demo Bottom" in The Big Book of Quickies, edited by Rachel Kramer Bussel (June 2024)
- "Drag" in Best Women's Erotica of the Year volume 8, edited by Rachel Kramer Bussel (December 2022)
- "Gift" in Come Again: Sex Toy Erotica, edited by Rachel Kramer Bussel (March 2015)
- "Goa" in Twice the Pleasure: Bisexual Women's Erotica, edited by Rachel Kramer Bussel (April 2013), and in "Breathless: Steamy Sexy Short Stories", edited by Roger Leatherwood (March 2015)
- "Hold On Harder" in Best Bondage Erotica of the Year volume 1, edited by Rachel Kramer Bussel (March 2020)
- "Floating in Space" in Girl Fever: 69 Stories of Sudden Sex for Lesbians, edited by Sacchi Green (June 2012)
- "Mojave" in Best Lesbian Erotica of the Year volume 2, edited by Rachel Kramer Bussel (March 2020)
- "Obey" in Dancing with Myself, edited by Jillian Boyd (February 2018)
- "Symphony" in Begging For It: Female Fantasy Erotica, edited by Rachel Kramer Bussel (July 2016)
- "Teamwork" in Me and My Boi: Queer Erotic Stories, edited by Sacchi Green (September 2015)Non-Fiction Articles:
- "Electric to the Azores" in Practical Boat Owner (February 2024)
- "Get More Life Out of Lines" in Practical Boat Owner (May 2024)
- "When the Ice Melts" in Practical Boat Owner (Summer Issue, June 2024)
