= Good Vibrations (sex shop) =

Sex-positive American company selling sex toys and other erotic products

- Type: place
- Industry: Retail adult industry business, also operates mail order business, E-commerce division; wholesale arm and film production company, (former publishing company)
- Founded: 1977; 49 years ago
- Headquarters: San Francisco, California
- Key people: Carol Queen, Staff Sexologist
- Products: Sex toys, adult videos and books
- Revenue: $11.9 million (2006)
- Number of employees: 63 (2014)
- Website: goodvibes.com

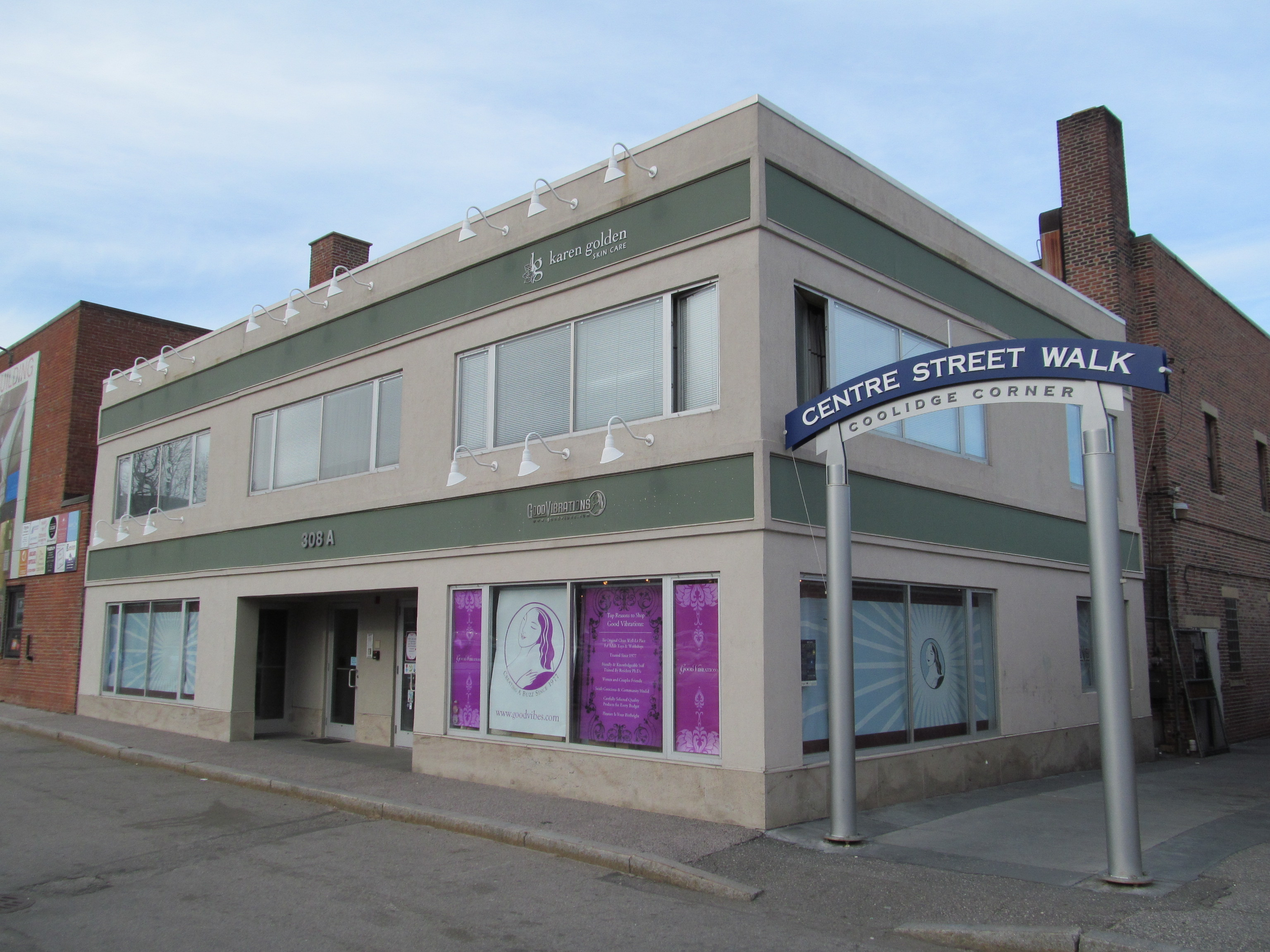
Good Vibrations in Brookline, Massachusetts

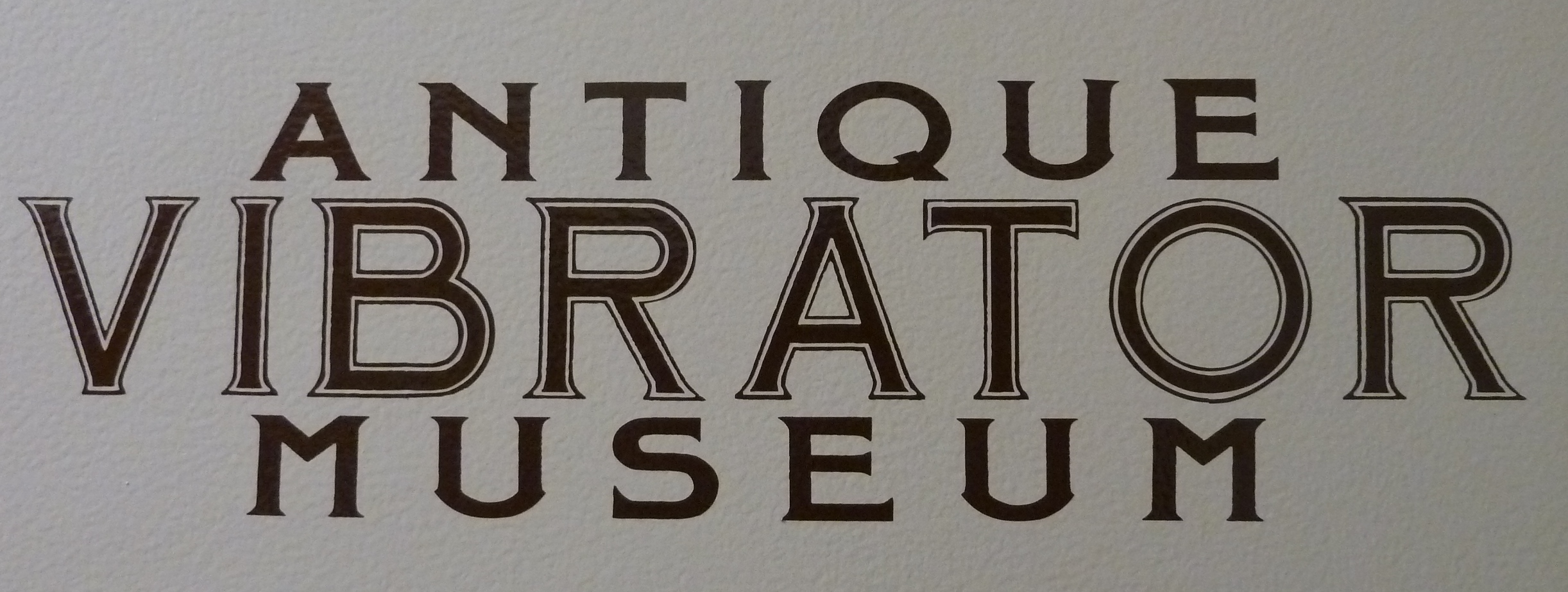
Sign for the Antique Vibrator Museum displayed at Good Vibrations store in San Francisco

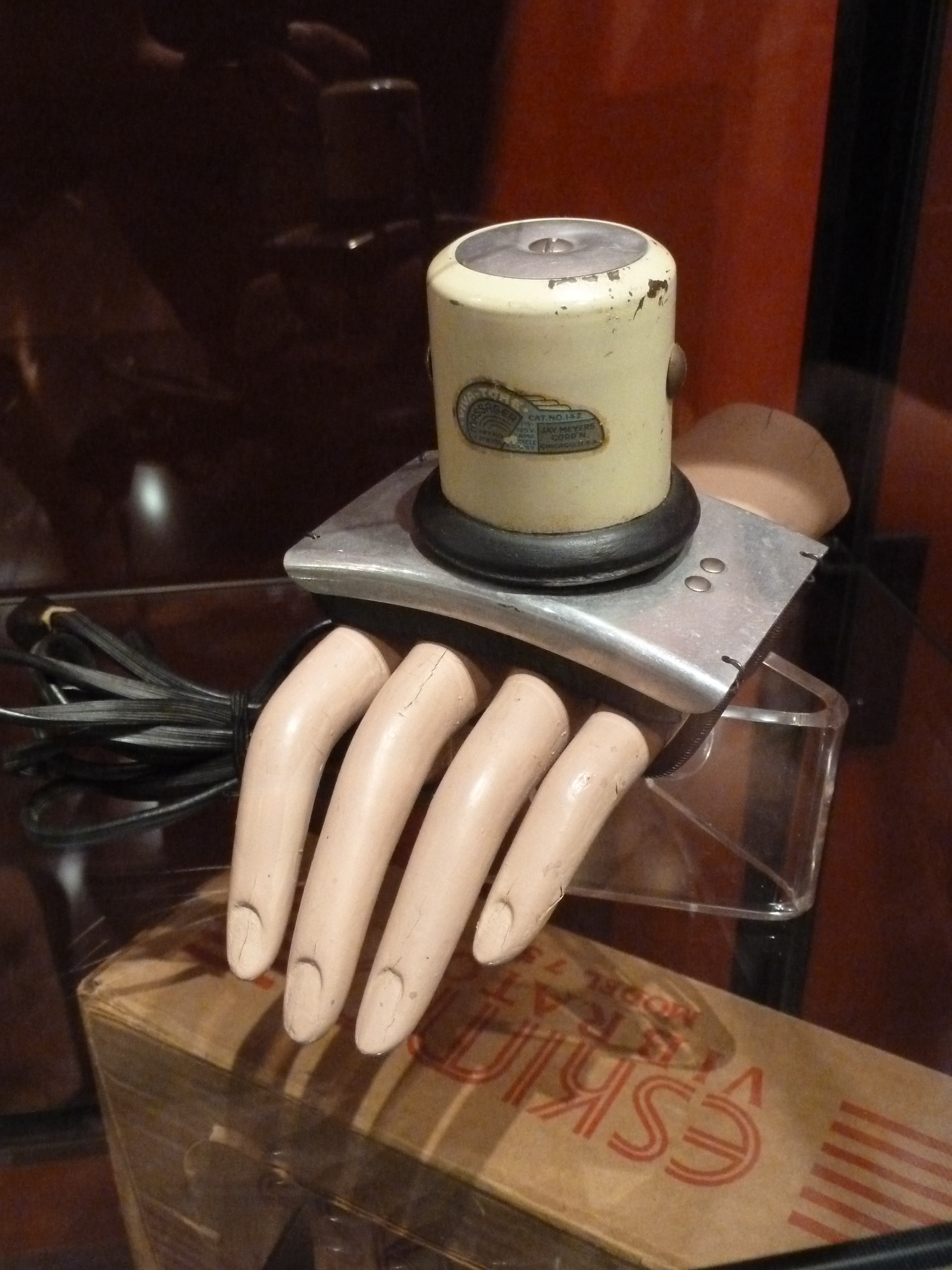
Antique vibrator displayed at Good Vibrations store in San Francisco

Good Vibrations is a sex-positive San Francisco–based corporation selling sex toys and other erotic products. It operates nine retail stores: seven in the San Francisco Bay Area, one in Brookline, Massachusetts, and one in Harvard Square; a mail-order business; an e-commerce website; a wholesale arm; and an erotic-video production company, Good Releasing. Formerly, it operated three publishing companies: Down There Press, Passion Press and Sexpositive Productions.

== History ==
Good Vibrations was the second sex-positive and women-friendly store in the United States, founded in 1977 by sex therapist and educator Joani Blank. (The first was Eve's Garden, founded by Dell Williams.) Initially established with the goal of being a sex-positive and woman-centered alternative to the adult bookstores of the time, Good Vibrations offered sex information and education, featured erotica and books about sexual health and pleasure, and pioneered the concept of the "sex-positive, clean, well-lighted place" to buy sex toys. One part of the store displayed antique vibrators, which were initially developed as a treatment for female hysteria. It became a tourist draw known as "the antique vibrator museum", which was listed by Frommer's in the category "Best Free Things to Do in San Francisco".

In 1992, Blank sold Good Vibrations to the workers (including herself) incorporating it as a worker cooperative. In 1994, she left the company to pursue other interests.

In 1995, Good Vibrations declared May to be National Masturbation Month, to raise awareness of masturbation and sexual health across the country and in response to the firing of then-Surgeon General Joycelyn Elders for saying that masturbation "is part of human sexuality, and perhaps it should be taught." In 1998 it launched the Masturbate-a-thon as part of National Masturbation Month; this strategy to get people to discuss masturbation by getting pledges from their friends later inspired a live event developed by the Center for Sex and Culture.

The cooperative voted to become a California corporation and did so in February 2006. In 2007, the company required an infusion of capital to stabilize its finances to help it overcome recent losses related to a drop in its Internet sales and was sold to GVA-TWN, a company based in Cleveland, Ohio, with a chain of novelty sex stores throughout the Midwest. Barnaby Ltd bought the company from GVA-TWN. In 2009 Jackie Rednour-Bruckman (Strano), a former worker-owner from the original co-operative, returned to become Chief Operations Officer and then Executive Vice President.

In 2006, Good Vibrations purchased and re-branded the Grand Opening! sex shop in Brookline, Massachusetts, as Good Vibrations' first location outside of the San Francisco Bay Area. In 2010, they opened their fifth location, a larger 3,000-square-foot (280 m^{2}) store on Mission Street in San Francisco, across the street from Bloomingdales. The formal grand opening celebration was pushed to 29 January 2011. The sixth retail location opened its doors on Lakeshore Avenue in Oakland, California, on January 2, 2012.

The company is a sponsor of LGBT events and organizations, groups that support sexual health, and other charities. Its GiVe donations program has aided in this. The company is a leading employer of transgender people.

The founders of Grand Opening! and Babeland interned at Good Vibrations before opening their businesses, and many sex-positive retail toy companies have been inspired by Good Vibrations. The company has also influenced the sex toy and adult movie industries to create and market new products that reflected changes in the demographics of consumers.

As part of their recognition as a leader in sex-positive culture and education, Good Vibrations received a Certificate of Honor from the San Francisco Board of Supervisors (2003), a Certificate of Recognition from the California Legislature Assembly (2004), and a Certificate of Recognition from the California Legislature (2006). The company has also received widespread recognition from the pornography industry, including an O Award for Outstanding Online Retailer 2009 at the Adult Entertainment Expo, Best Sexuality Retail Chain 2011 from AVN, and Boutique Retailer of the Year 2011 from XBIZ.

In August 2017, Good Vibrations purchased Babeland. Babeland continues to operate as a separate brand.

== Good Releasing ==
Good Releasing offers various lines of adult titles and educational films:

- Reel Queer Productions ("Documenting authentic, edgy, queer sex and culture with relevant, intelligent films inclusive of the many sexualities that identify as queer")
- HeartCore Films ("Offering artistic alternatives to formulaic features with films by independent artists with fresh, diverse content")
- PleasureEd Series ("a wide range of informational and instructional content to inspire and enhance your sex life")

Several Good Releasing films have been nominated for or have received awards, many from the films by director Courtney Trouble, who helped develop the Reel Queer Productions studio:

2010 Feminist Porn Awards
Fluid: Men Redefining Sexuality (Best Bi Movie)
Dangerous Curves (Most Deliciously Diverse Cast)
Speakeasy (Most Tantalizing Trans Film)

2010 AVN nominations
Best New Production Company
Roulette (Best Music Soundtrack)
Speakeasy (Best Music Soundtrack)

2009 Feminist Porn Awards
Roulette (Most Deliciously Diverse Cast)

== Retail awards ==
- 2010 XBIZ Award Nominee: Web Retailer of the Year
- 2015 XBIZ Award - Retailer of the Year – Boutique
