= International Masturbation Month =

Commemoration for sex-positivity in May

The month of May is celebrated as International Masturbation Month. It started in the United States as National Masturbation Day, an annual event held to protect and celebrate the "right to masturbate". The first National Masturbation Day was held in 1995, on either May 7 or May 28, after sex-positive retailer Good Vibrations declared the day in honor of Surgeon General Joycelyn Elders, who was fired by President Bill Clinton in 1994 for suggesting masturbation be part of the sex education curriculum for students. Later, it became known as International Masturbation Day. In 2023, in honor of Magic Wand's 55th Anniversary and in conjunction with Masturbation May #truemagicwand was started on May 20.

== Trade facilitation ==
The original purpose of this event was to talk about masturbation in operational aspects, social issues, personal health, the benefits of masturbation, but also to promote sexual activity and intimate toys. This contrasts with business activity in the earlier period, when "anti-masturbation business" activity promoted the purchase and sale of items such as erection equipment, dildos, sex dolls, sleepwear, and semen spill prevention equipment. Now, in the sex toy business, there has been a boom in sales of series of masturbation support tools. Scott Fraser, president and CEO of Empowered Products, said: "Personally, I think every month should be Masturbation Month. It's easy to work every day knowing that all of our products help millions of people fulfill the desire of most".

On May 1, 2017, TENGA, a health, sex company in Japan, launched the #DoItInMay campaign to commemorate Masturbation Month and aims to increase dialog, raise the level of accepted culture revolving around sexual health, and pleasure itself overcomes taboos. At the same time, also promote the business activity of the kinds of goods of this company. The company also released its 2018 wanking Global Reporting Survey. It's considered the largest study on masturbation in the world.

== See also ==
- Bodily integrity
- Masturbate-a-thon
- No Nut November
- Self-love
- Sex-positive movement
- Wank Week
