= Onania: or, the heinous sin of self-pollution =

18th century pamphlet opposing masturbation

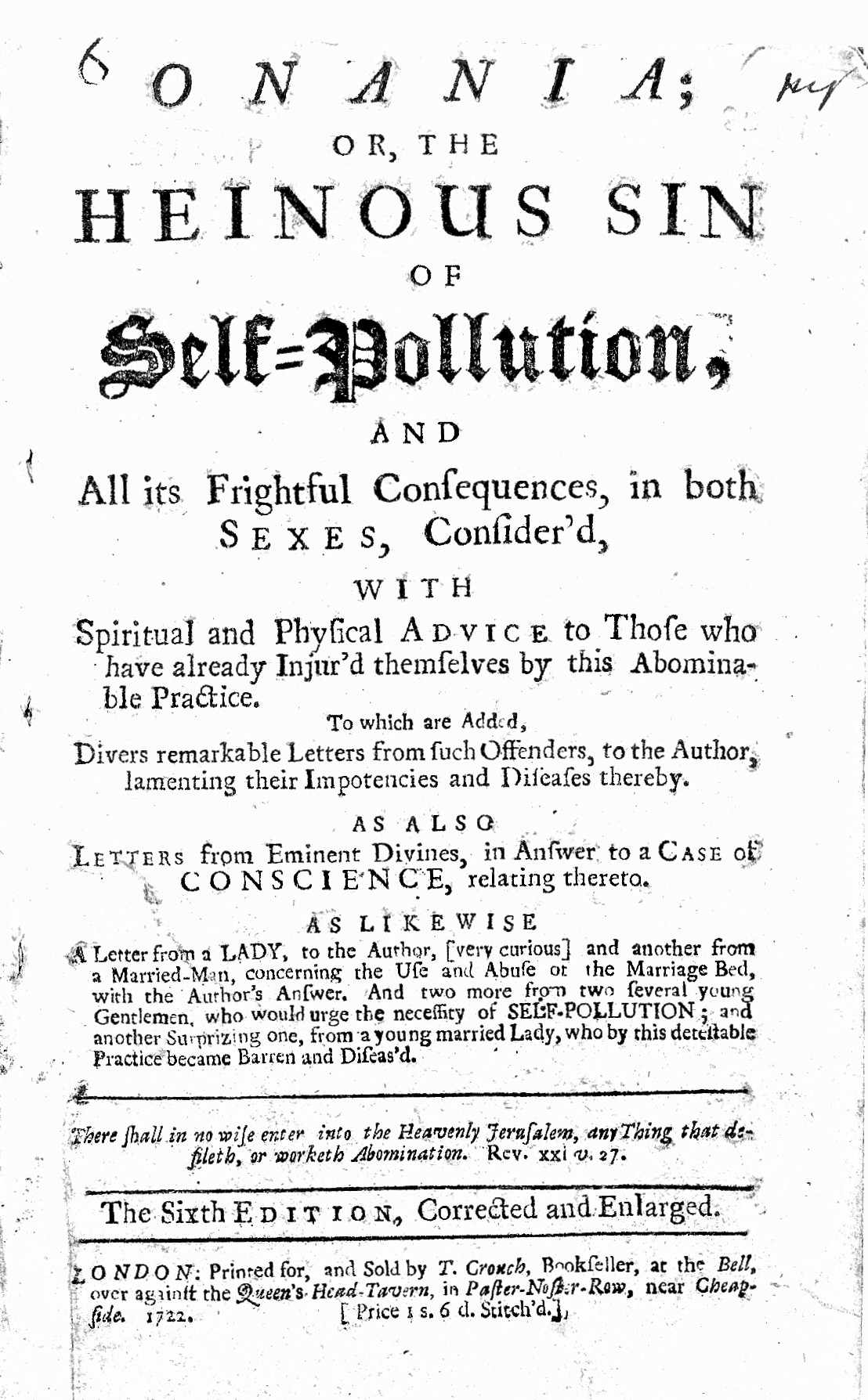
Sixth Edition of Onania (1722)

Onania, or the Heinous Sin of Self-Pollution, and All Its Frightful Consequences, in Both Sexes, Considered, With Spiritual and Physical Advice for Those Who Have Already Injur'd Themselves by This Abominable Practice, often referred to by its shortened title: Onania: or, the heinous sin of self-pollution, or simply Onania, is a pamphlet opposing masturbation. Its date of first publication is thought to be around 1712–1716 and copies are known to have been printed in London in 1723. The identity of its author is unknown; it has been variously attributed to the English surgeon John Marten, and to a "Dr. Bekkers".

By 1730, there had been fifteen revised editions of the book by which time around 15,000 copies of the pamphlet had been printed. It experienced international popularity, being translated into Dutch and German. It was a best-seller of its time, selling tens of thousands of copies.

== Contents ==
Onania's author reaffirms contemporary religious beliefs that masturbation is sinful and one should therefore abstain from it. They also argue that the practice would result in diseases and physical abnormalities such as epilepsy, pallor, hysteria, feeble legs, and weak jaws. Onania did not invent such ideas, but rather reproduced already existing notions. The pamphlet also warns against the degradation of the human race by associating masturbation with giving birth to weak and sickly children. Masturbation was said to cause a degradation of sperm and cause impotence.

Onania describes masturbation as a "heinous sin" with "frightful consequences", but considers it less serious than sodomy.

The pamphlet encourages readers to buy remedies to help treat localised areas affected by masturbating.

== Influence ==
Onania was a significant influence on Samuel-Auguste Tissot's L'Onanisme in which he documents the negative effects of masturbation, especially on the nervous system.
