= Samuel-Auguste Tissot =

Swiss physician (1728–1797)

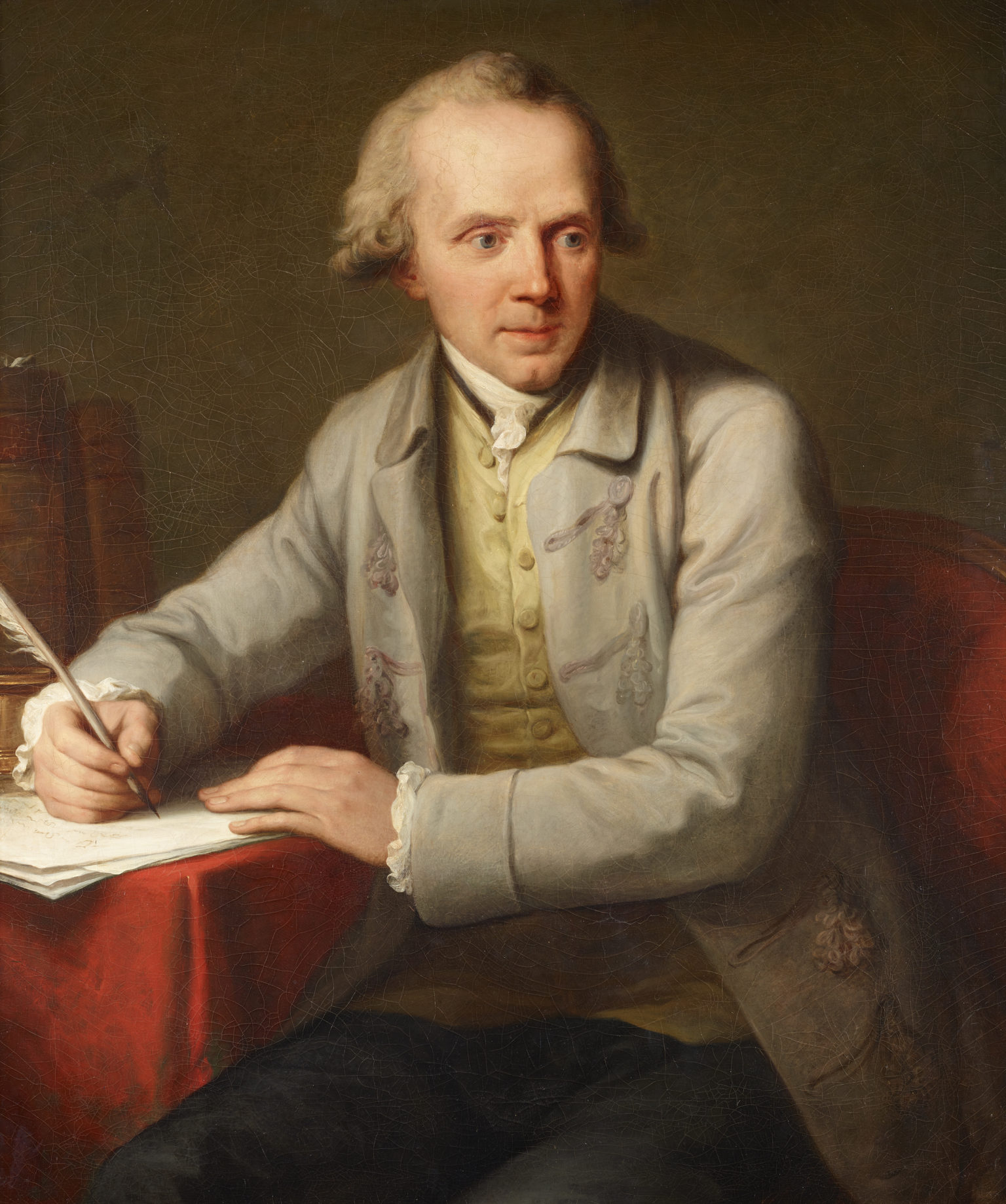
- Portrait by Angelika Kauffmann, 1783
- Born: Samuel Auguste André David Tissot; 20 March 1728; Grancy
- Died: 13 June 1797 (aged 69); Lausanne
- Scientific career
- Fields: Medicine

Samuel Auguste André David Tissot (English: /tiːˈsoʊ/ tee-SOH, French: [samɥɛl ogyst tiso]; 20 March 1728 – 13 June 1797) was a notable 18th-century Swiss physician.

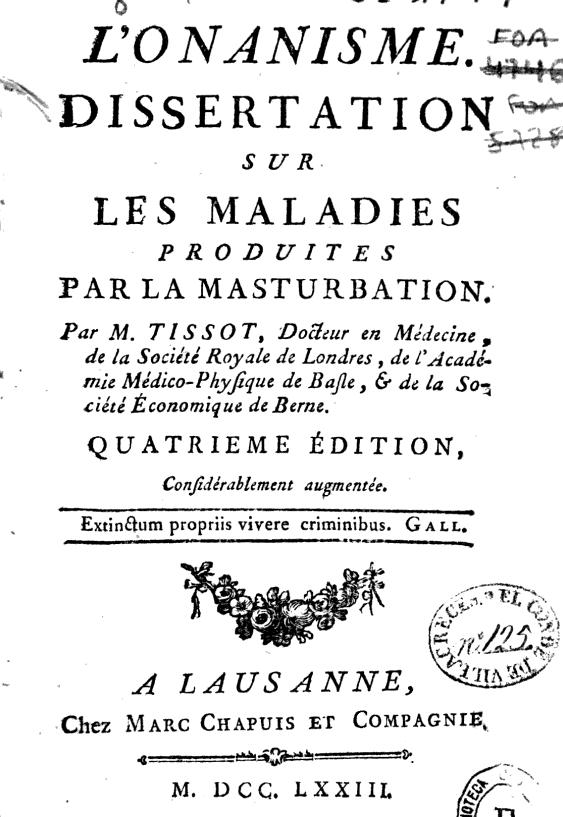
L'Onanisme. Tissot's monograph which influenced negative view of masturbation.

== Life ==
A well-reputed Calvinist Protestant neurologist, physician, professor and Vatican adviser, Tissot practiced in the Swiss city of Lausanne. He wrote on the diseases of the poor, on masturbation, on the diseases of men of letters and of rich people, and nervous diseases.

He devoted an 83-page chapter to the study of migraine in his Traité des nerfs et de leurs maladies (Treatise on the nerves and nervous disorders). He used his own observations and the existing medical treatises of the day. His work is considered by modern doctors as a basis for "future generations of doctors." He is also recognized as "the classical authority on migraine."

== L'Onanisme ==
In 1760, he published L'Onanisme, his own comprehensive medical treatise on the purported ill-effects of masturbation. Citing case studies of young male masturbators amongst his patients in Lausanne as basis for his reasoning, Tissot argued that semen was an "essential oil" and "stimulus" that, when lost from the body in great amounts, would cause "a perceptible reduction of strength, of memory and even of reason; blurred vision, all the nervous disorders, all types of gout and rheumatism, weakening of the organs of generation, blood in the urine, disturbance of the appetite, headaches and a great number of other disorders."

His treatise was presented as a scholarly, scientific work in a time when experimental physiology was practically nonexistent. The authority with which the work was subsequently treated — Tissot's arguments were even acknowledged and echoed by Kant and Voltaire — arguably turned the perception of masturbation in Western medicine over the next two centuries into that of a debilitating illness. L'Onanisme is now regarded to have been substantially influenced by the anonymous pamphlet Onania: or, the heinous sin of self-pollution.

== Other works ==
Tissot's most famous work in his lifetime was Avis au peuple sur sa santé (1761), arguably the greatest medical best-seller of the eighteenth century.

On 1 April 1787, Napoleon Bonaparte wrote to Dr. Tissot complimenting him on spending his “days in treating humanity” noting that his “reputation has reached even into the mountains of Corsica” and describing “the respect I have for your works…"

== Major works ==
- Treatise on the Health of Men of Letters
- L'Onanisme
- Avis au peuple sur sa santé
- Anleitung für den geringen Mann in Städten und auf dem Lande in Absicht auf seine Gesundheit. Beigefügte Werke: ... mit 2 fremden Abhandlungen begleitet. Die eine: Von der Unvollkommenheit der meisten deutschen praktischen Handbücher und den Vorzügen des Tissotischen. Die zweyte: Von den wahren Mitteln, ein hohes Alter zu erreichen / aus dem Schwed. des Herrn Dr. Schulz. Hamburg : Typogr. Ges., 1767. Digital edition by the University and State Library Düsseldorf
- Anleitung für das Landvolk in Absicht auf seine Gesundheit . Füßlin, Zürich 1767 Digital edition by the University and State Library Düsseldorf

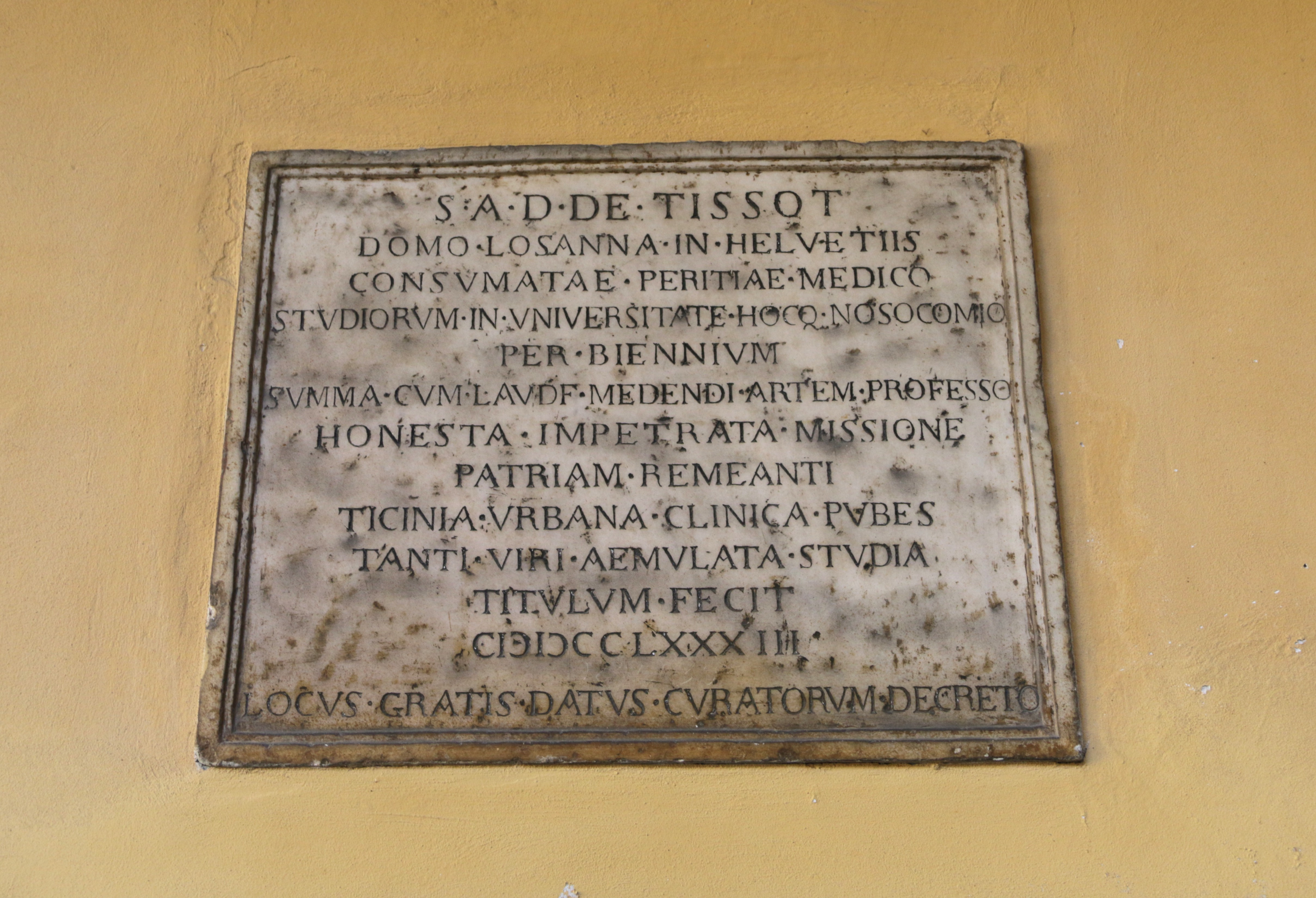
Plaque honouring Tissot at the University of Pavia (Italy)

- Vermehrungen, Zusätze und Verbesserungen zu seiner Anleitung für das Landvolk in Absicht auf seine Gesundheit : zum nützlichen Gebrauch derer, welche die Augsburger, mit allergnädigster röm. kaiserl. Freiheit im Jahr 1766 erschienene Auflage besitzen . Wolff, Augsburg 1768 Digital edition by the University and State Library Düsseldorf
- Von der Gesundheit der Gelehrten . Orell, Gessner, Füessli, Zürich 1770 Digital edition by the University and State Library Düsseldorf
- Über die Krankheiten der Selbstbefleckung / S. A. D. Tissot. Aus dem Lat. übers., mit Anm. und einem Anh. begleitet von G. F. C. Wendelstadt . Ungewitter, Wetzlar 1797 Digital edition by the University and State Library Düsseldorf
