= Down There Press =

Feminist book, DVD, and audiobook publisher

- Status: Active
- Founded: 1975; 51 years ago
- Founder: Joani Blank
- Country of origin: United States
- Headquarters location: San Francisco, California
- Key people: Joani Blank
- Publication types: Books, DVDs, Audiobooks
- Nonfiction topics: sexuality, health, erotica, self help
- Owner: Worker owned

Down There Press is an independently run feminist book, DVD, and audiobook publisher that focuses on sexuality. It publishes both visual and literary erotica, and is known for its publications on youth and adolescent sexuality.

Down There Press was founded by sex educator Joani Blank in 1975 in San Francisco, California. Blank's 1975 book The Playbook for Women About Sex was the first publication. Blank has published all of her work through the press.

Herotica, a collection of women's erotica, was the first fiction series that the press published.

Down There Press carries titles from authors such as Carol Queen, Jack Morin, Isadora Alman, Kate Dominic, Susie Bright, Cathy Winks, and Martha Cornog.

== See also ==
- Good Vibrations
