= Human Sexuality Collection =

Project at Cornell University Library

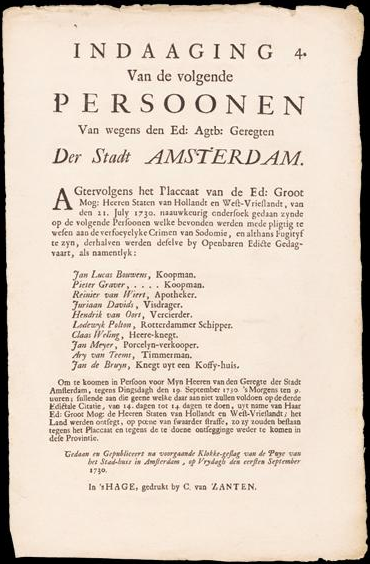
Wanted poster for sodomites, published in the city of Amsterdam in 1730

The Human Sexuality Collection (HSC) is a project at Cornell University Library, part of Cornell's Rare and Manuscript Collections, which aims to collect "primary sources" on human sexuality, with a special focus on "U.S. lesbian, gay, bisexual, and transgender history and the politics of pornography".

It was established in 1988 by David B. Goodstein (publisher of The Advocate) and Bruce Voeller (an early leader of the National Gay Task Force).

In 2011, it received a substantial collection of Harry Weintraub, collected since the early 1980s, which consists of more than 10,000 items related to male homosexuality, dating back as far as the 1860s, now named the Harry H. Weintraub Collection of Gay-Related Photography and Historical Documentation.
