= Masturbation =

Sexual stimulation of one's own genitals

A male masturbating

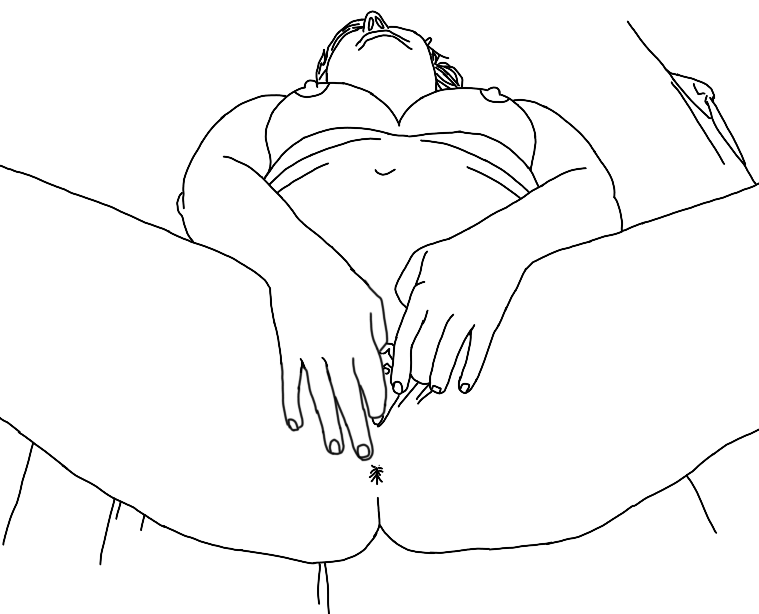
A female masturbating

Masturbation is a form of autoeroticism in which a person sexually stimulates their own genitals for sexual arousal or other sexual pleasure, usually to the point of orgasm. In humans, this typically involves orgasm in both sexes and, in males, is often accompanied by ejaculation. Stimulation may involve the use of hands, everyday objects, sex toys, or more rarely, the mouth (autofellatio and autocunnilingus). Masturbation may also be performed with a sex partner, either masturbating together or watching the other partner masturbate, known as "mutual masturbation".

Masturbation is frequent in both sexes. Various medical and psychological benefits have been attributed to a healthy attitude toward sexual activity in general and to masturbation in particular. Masturbation is considered by clinicians to be a healthy, normal part of sexual enjoyment. Masturbation has been depicted in art since prehistoric times, and is both mentioned and discussed in very early writings. Religions vary in their views of masturbation. In the 18th and 19th centuries, some European theologians and physicians described it in negative terms, but during the 20th century, these taboos generally declined. There has been an increase in discussion and portrayal of masturbation in art, popular music, television, films, and literature. The legal status of masturbation has also varied through history, and masturbation in public is illegal in most countries. Masturbation in non-human animals has been observed both in the wild and captivity.

== Etymology ==
The word masturbation was introduced in the 18th century, based on the Latin verb masturbari, alongside the slightly earlier onanism. The Latin verb masturbari is of uncertain origin. Suggested derivations include an unattested word for penis, *mazdo, cognate with Greek μέζεα mézea 'genitals', or alternatively a corruption of an unattested *manu stuprare ("to defile with the hand"), by association with turbare 'to disturb'.

== Terminology ==
While masturbation is the formal word for this practice, many other expressions are in common use. Terms such as playing with oneself, pleasuring oneself and slang such as wanking, jerking off, jacking off, fapping and frigging are common. Self-abuse and self-pollution were common in early modern times and are still found in modern dictionaries. A large variety of other euphemisms and dysphemisms exist which describe masturbation.

== Techniques ==
=== General ===
Masturbation involves touching, pressing, rubbing, or massaging one's own genital area with the hands, fingers, or against an object such as a pillow; inserting fingers or an object into the vagina or anus (see anal masturbation); and stimulating the penis or vulva with an electric vibrator, which may also be inserted into the vagina or anus. It may also involve touching, rubbing, or pinching the nipples or other erogenous zones while masturbating. Both sexes sometimes apply lubricants to reduce friction.

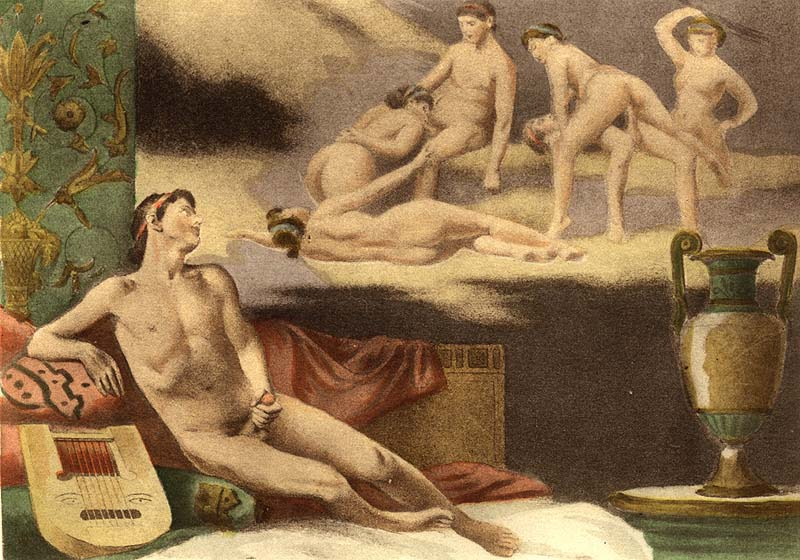
One of the illustrations to De figuris Veneris by Édouard-Henri Avril. It portrays a male masturbating by manually stimulating his own penis while sexually fantasizing.

Reading or viewing pornography, sexual fantasies, or other erotic stimuli may lead to a desire for sexual release such as by masturbation. Pornography is also used to assist with masturbation and to improve the experience of masturbating. Some people get sexual pleasure by inserting objects, such as urethral sounds, into the urethra (the tube through which urine and, in men, semen, flows), a practice known as urethral play or "sounding". Other objects such as ball point pens and thermometers are sometimes used, although this practice can lead to injury or infection. Some people use sex machines to simulate intercourse.

Men and women may masturbate until they are close to orgasm, stop for a while to reduce excitement, and then resume masturbating. They may repeat this cycle multiple times. This "stop and go" build-up, known as "edging", can achieve even stronger orgasms. Rarely, people quit stimulation just before orgasm to retain the heightened energy that normally comes down after orgasm.

=== Female masturbation ===
==== Manual stimulation (fingering) ====
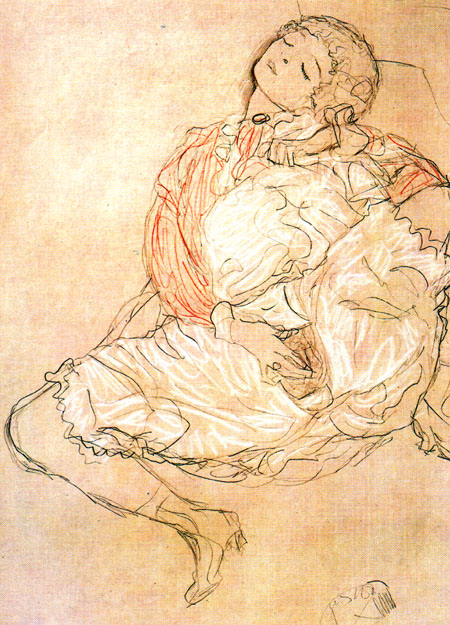
Illustration of a female masturbating by manually stimulating her vulva (fingering) – Gustav Klimt's Woman seated with thighs apart (1916)

Manual stimulation for masturbation among females involves the stroking or rubbing of the vulva, especially the clitoris, with an index or middle finger, or both. Sometimes one or more fingers may be inserted into the vagina to stroke its frontal wall where the G-spot may be located.

==== Other methods ====
Masturbation aids such as a vibrator, dildo, or Ben Wa balls can also be used to stimulate the vagina and clitoris. Many women caress their breasts or stimulate a nipple with the free hand and anal stimulation is also enjoyed by some. Personal lubricant is sometimes used during masturbation, especially when penetration is involved, but this is not universal and many women find their natural lubrication sufficient.

Common positions for female masturbation include lying on one's back or face down, sitting, squatting, kneeling, or standing. In a bath or shower, a female may direct water via a handheld showerhead at her clitoris, vulva, or perineum. Lying face down one may use their hands, one may straddle a pillow, the corner or edge of the bed, a partner's leg or some scrunched-up clothing and "hump" the vulva and clitoris against it. Standing up, a chair, the corner of an item of furniture, or even a washing machine can be used to stimulate the clitoris through the labia and clothing. Some masturbate only using pressure applied to the clitoris without direct contact, for example by pressing the palm or ball of the hand against underwear or other clothing. In the 1920s, Havelock Ellis reported that turn-of-the-century seamstresses using treadle-operated sewing machines could achieve orgasm by sitting near the edge of their chairs.

Women can stimulate themselves sexually by crossing their legs tightly and clenching the muscles in their legs, creating pressure on the genitals (syntribation). This can potentially be done in public without observers noticing. Thoughts, fantasies, and memories of previous instances of arousal and orgasm can produce sexual excitation. Some women can orgasm spontaneously by force of will alone, although this may not strictly qualify as masturbation as no physical stimulus is involved.

Sex therapists will sometimes recommend that female patients take time to masturbate to orgasm, for example, to help improve sexual health and relationships, to help determine what is erotically pleasing to them, and because mutual masturbation can lead to more satisfying sexual relationships and added intimacy.

=== Male masturbation ===
==== Manual stimulation ====
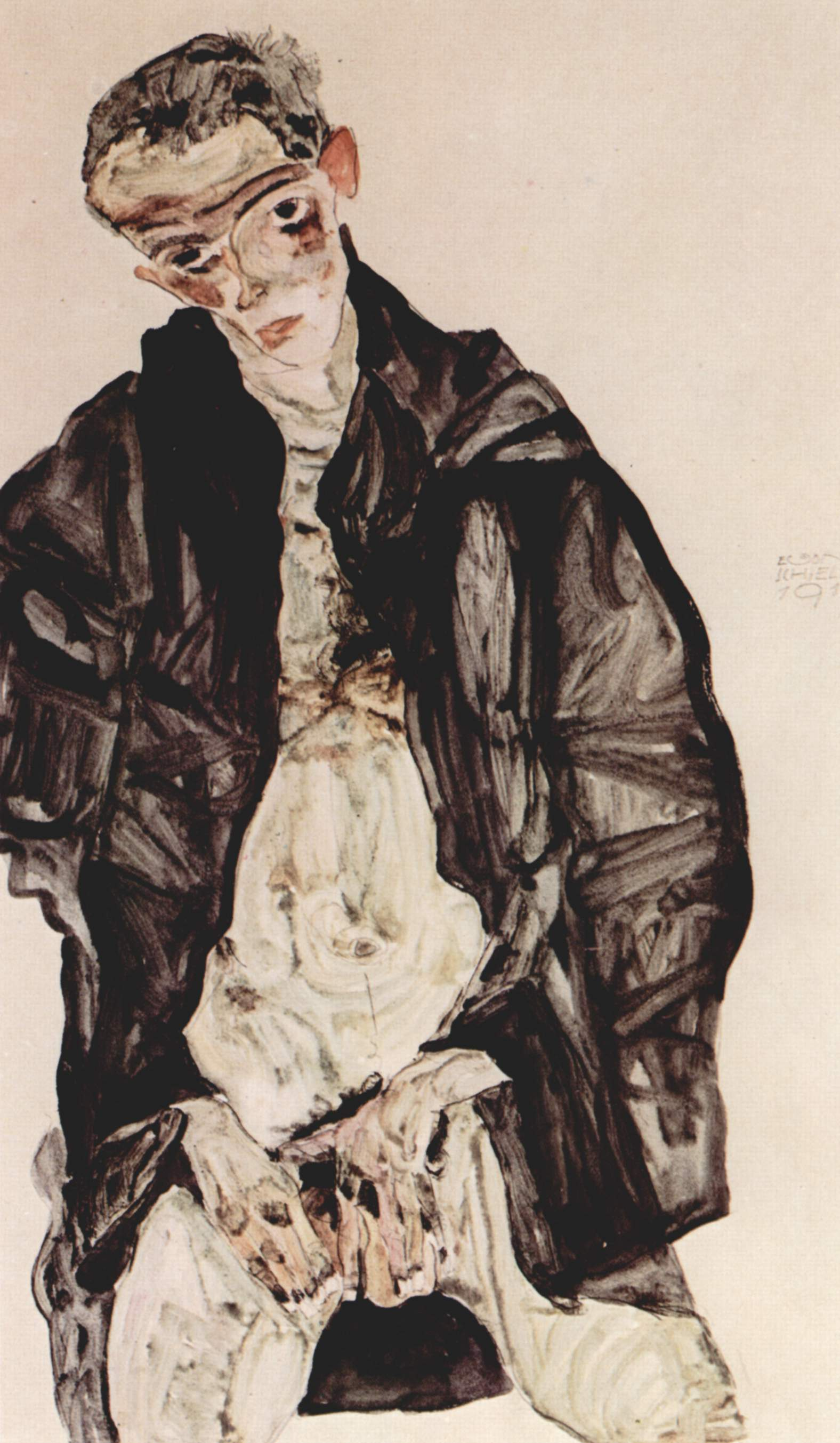
Illustration of a male masturbating by manually stimulating his penis – Egon Schiele's Selbstbefriedigung (1911)

The most common masturbation technique is to hold the penis with a loose fist and then move the hand up and down on the glans and the shaft of the penis. This type of stimulation can result in orgasm and ejaculation. The hand motion and the speed of the action may vary throughout the masturbation session. Some men may use their free hand to fondle their scrotum and testicles, the perineum, and other body parts, or may place both hands directly on the penis. Common positions include standing, sitting, lying on one's back or lying face down, squatting, or kneeling. In some cases, to avoid friction and irritation or to enhance sexual sensation, men prefer to use a personal lubricant or saliva. Men may also rub or massage different areas of their glans, like its ventral surface, the left and right sides, the rounded rim, known as the corona, and around the frenulum. Some men lie face down in prone position and gently rub their penis against a comfortable surface, such as a mattress or pillow, a technique known as prone masturbation.

==== Other methods ====
Prostate massage is one other technique used for sexual stimulation, often to reach orgasm. The prostate is sometimes referred to as the "male G-spot" or P-spot. Some men can achieve orgasm through stimulation of the prostate gland, by stimulating it using a well-lubricated finger or dildo inserted through the anus into the rectum. Men who report the sensation of prostate stimulation often give descriptions similar to females' accounts of G-spot stimulation. In some men, prostate stimulation might produce more intense orgasms than penile stimulation. Stimulating the prostate from outside, via pressure on the perineum, can be pleasurable as well. Anal masturbation without any prostate stimulation, with fingers or otherwise, is also a technique that some men enjoy. The muscles of the anus contract during orgasm, thus the presence of an object holding the sphincter open can strengthen the sensation of the contractions and intensify orgasm.

Some men keep their hands stationary while pumping into them with pelvic thrusts to simulate the motions of sexual intercourse. The nipples are erogenous zones and vigorous stimulation of them during masturbation can result in enhanced sexual arousal. Others may also use vibrators and other sexual devices for sexual stimulation. The device can be used to stimulate the penis and other areas, like the scrotum, the perineum or the anus. Other sexual toys for men are artificial vaginas such as fleshlights. In a bath or shower, a male may direct water via a handheld showerhead at his frenulum, testicles, or perineum. An ejaculation control technique is to put intense pressure on the perineum, about halfway between the scrotum and the anus, just before ejaculating. This can, however, redirect semen into the bladder (referred to as retrograde ejaculation).

== Mutual masturbation ==
Mutual masturbation involves two or more people who either masturbate at the same time or sexually stimulate each other, usually with the hands. It can be practiced by people of any sexual orientation, and can be part of other sexual activity. It may be used as foreplay, or as an alternative to sexual penetration. When used as an alternative to penile-vaginal penetration, the goal may be to preserve virginity or to avoid risk of pregnancy. Forms of mutual masturbation include:

- Non-contact mutual masturbation – Two people masturbating in the presence of each other but not touching.
- Contact mutual masturbation – One person touching another person to masturbate. The other person may do the same during or after.
- Non-contact group – More than two people masturbating in the presence of each other in a group but not touching each other.
- Contact group – More than two people physically touching each other to masturbate as a group.
- Mutual masturbation foreplay – The manual stimulation of each other's genitals where the session eventually leads to sexual intercourse.
- Remote mutual masturbation – Some mutual masturbation occurs between individuals in different locations, facilitated by internet enabled devices, sometimes referred to as teledildonics.

== Frequency, age, and sex ==
Frequency of masturbation is determined by many factors, e.g., one's resistance to sexual tension, hormone levels influencing sexual arousal, sexual habits, peer influences, health and one's attitude to masturbation formed by culture; E. Heiby and J. Becker examined the latter. Medical causes have also been associated with masturbation, wherein masturbation is not cause, but effect, with the exception of inserting foreign objects into the urinary bladder.

Different studies have found that masturbation is frequent in humans. Alfred Kinsey's 1950s studies on the US population have shown that 92% of men and 62% of women have masturbated during their lifespan. Similar results have been found in a 2007 British national probability survey. It was found that, among individuals aged 16 to 44, 95% of men and 71% of women masturbated at some point in their lives. 73% of men and 37% of women reported masturbating in the four weeks before their interview, while 53% of men and 18% of women reported masturbating in the previous seven days.

The Merck Manual says that 97% of men and 80% of women have masturbated and that, generally speaking, males masturbate more than females. It states that almost half of the population reported to have masturbated in the past four weeks. Masturbation is considered normal when performed by children, even in early infancy. In 2009, the Sheffield NHS Health Trust issued a pamphlet called "Pleasure" which discussed the health benefits of masturbation. This was done in response to data and experience from the other EU member states to reduce teen pregnancy and STIs (STDs), and to promote healthy habits.

According to the New Oxford Textbook of Psychiatry (1st ed.), "Masturbation and sexual play are common well before puberty. Sexual behaviour in young children is common, and should only be regarded as a sign of sexual abuse when it is out of context and is inappropriate." In the book Human Sexuality: Diversity in Contemporary America, by Strong, Devault and Sayad, the authors point out, "A baby boy may laugh in his crib while playing with his erect penis". "Baby girls sometimes move their bodies rhythmically, almost violently, appearing to experience orgasm." Italian gynecologists Giorgio Giorgi and Marco Siccardi observed via ultrasound a female fetus possibly masturbating and having what appeared to be an orgasm.

Popular belief asserts that individuals of either sex who are not in sexually active relationships tend to masturbate more frequently than those who are; however, much of the time this is not true as masturbation alone or with a partner is often a feature of a relationship. Contrary to this belief, several studies reveal a positive correlation between the frequency of masturbation and the frequency of intercourse. A study has reported a significantly higher rate of masturbation in gay men and women who were in a relationship. Coon and Mitterer stated: "Approximately 70 percent of married women and men masturbate at least occasionally." Mitterer, Coon and Martini wrote in 2015: "Do more men masturbate than women? Yes. While 89 percent of women reported that they had masturbated at some time, the figure was 95 percent for men. (Some cynics add, 'And the other 5 percent lied!')"

== Evolutionary utility ==
Female masturbation alters conditions in the vagina, cervix, and uterus in ways that can alter the chances of conception from intercourse, depending on the timing of the masturbation. A female's orgasm between one minute before and 45 minutes after insemination favors the chances of sperm reaching her egg. If, for example, she has had intercourse with more than one male, such an orgasm can increase the likelihood of a pregnancy by one of them. Female masturbation can also provide protection against cervical infections by increasing the acidity of the cervical mucus and by moving debris out of the cervix. In males, masturbation flushes out old sperm with low motility from the male's genital tract. The next ejaculation then contains proportionally more fresh sperm, which have higher chances of achieving conception during intercourse. If more than one male has intercourse with a female, the sperm with the highest motility will compete more effectively.

== Health effects ==
The medical consensus is that masturbation is a medically healthy and psychologically normal habit. (Note: Scientific consensus and medical consensus) No causal relationship between masturbation and any form of mental or physical disorder has been found. It is found to be harmful only as a result of certain medical conditions such as Peyronie's disease, or the hard flaccid syndrome. It does not deplete one's body of energy or cause premature ejaculation. According to the Merck Manual of Diagnosis and Therapy, "It is considered abnormal only when it inhibits partner-oriented behavior, is done in public, or is sufficiently compulsive to cause distress."

Solitary masturbation is a sexual activity that is nearly free of risk of sexually transmitted infection. With two or more participants, the risk of sexually transmitted infection, while not eliminated, remains lower than with most forms of penetrative sex. Support for such a view and for making masturbation part of the American sex education curriculum led to the dismissal as US Surgeon General of Joycelyn Elders during the Clinton administration.

=== Benefits ===
Masturbation among adolescents contributes to their developing a sense of mastery over sexual impulses, and it has a role in the physical and emotional development of prepubescents and pubescents. Masturbation can help someone determine what they like sexually or not from having the opportunity to explore. Sex therapists sometimes recommend that female patients take time to masturbate to orgasm; for example, to help improve sexual health and relationships, to help determine what is erotically pleasing to them, and because mutual masturbation can lead to more satisfying sexual relationships and added intimacy. Encyclopedia Britannica mentions the use of masturbation inside sex therapy, as does Human Sexuality: An Encyclopedia. Britannica also calls the idea that masturbation is physically harmful a "myth", and states that there is no evidence that it is an immature behavior.

==== Relationship benefits ====
Mutual masturbation enables partners in a couple to reveal the "map to [their] pleasure centers", learning how they enjoy being touched. When intercourse is inconvenient or impractical, mutual masturbation affords couples the opportunity to obtain sexual release as often as desired. It is held in many mental health circles that masturbation can relieve depression and lead to a higher sense of self-esteem. When one partner in a relationship wants more sex than the other, masturbation can provide a balancing effect and promote a more harmonious relationship.

==== Reduced prostate cancer ====
In 2003, an Australian research team led by Graham Giles of The Cancer Council Australia found that males who masturbated frequently had a lower probability of developing prostate cancer, although they could not demonstrate a direct causation. A 2008 study concluded that frequent ejaculation between the ages of 20 and 40 was correlated with higher risk of developing prostate cancer, while frequent ejaculation in the sixth decade of life was found to be correlated with a lower risk. However, a larger 2016 study found that regular ejaculation markedly reduced prostate cancer risk in all age groups.

==== Reduced heart disease risks ====
A study published in 1997 found an inverse association between death from coronary heart disease and frequency of orgasm, even given the risk that myocardial ischaemia and myocardial infarction can be triggered by sexual activity. Its authors stated: "The association between frequency of orgasm and all cause mortality was also examined using the midpoint of each response category recorded as number of orgasms per year. The age adjusted odds ratio for an increase of 100 orgasms per year was 0.64 (0.44 to 0.95)." That is, a difference in mortality appeared between any two subjects when one subject ejaculated at around two times per week more than the other. Assuming a broad range average of between three and five ejaculations per week for healthy males, this would mean five to seven ejaculations per week. This is consistent with a 2003 paper that found the strength of these correlations increased with increasing frequency of ejaculation.

==== Reduced congestion ====
A 2008 study at Tabriz Medical University found that ejaculation reduces swollen nasal blood vessels, freeing the airway for normal breathing. The mechanism is through stimulation of the sympathetic nervous system and is long-lasting. The study author suggests: "It can be done [from] time-to-time to alleviate the congestion and the patient can adjust the number of intercourses or masturbations depending on the severity of the symptoms." Sexual climax leaves an individual in a relaxed and contented state, frequently followed by drowsiness and sleep.

==== Exercise ====
Some professionals consider masturbation equivalent to a cardiovascular workout. Though research remains scant, those suffering from cardiovascular disorders, particularly those recovering from heart attacks, should resume physical activity gradually and with the frequency and rigor which their physical status will allow. This limitation can serve as encouragement to follow through with physical therapy sessions to help improve endurance. In general, sex slightly increases energy consumption.

=== Risks ===
Masturbation is generally safe, and complications are rare. When issues do occur, they are generally due to methodology, or underlying psychiatric illness. Research indicates that men with atypical masturbation, such as prone masturbation and squeezing legs masturbation, have higher rates of erectile dysfunction (ED) than men with typical masturbation.

Those who insert objects as aids to masturbation risk them becoming stuck (either due to size, technique, or anatomy, including rectal foreign bodies, as well as urethral foreign bodies), causing damage. Such risks can affect both men and women, with a multitude of case reports available, including that of a female who pierced her urethra after inserting two pencils during masturbation, and the case of a male who required extensive treatment after inserting earphone wires into his bladder.

A male whose penis is bluntly traumatized during intercourse or masturbation may, rarely, sustain a penile fracture, develop Peyronie's disease, or induce hard flaccid syndrome. In these cases, any energetic manipulation of the penis can cause discomfort or further damage. A small percentage of males experience postorgasmic illness syndrome (POIS), which can cause severe muscle pain throughout the body and other symptoms immediately following ejaculation, whether due to masturbation or partnered sex. The symptoms last for up to a week. Some doctors speculate that the frequency of POIS "in the population may be greater than has been reported in the academic literature", and that many cases are undiagnosed.

Compulsive masturbation and other compulsive behaviors can be signs of an emotional problem, which may need to be addressed by a mental health specialist. As with any "nervous habit", it is more helpful to consider the causes of compulsive behavior, rather than try to repress masturbation. Alongside many other factors—such as medical evidence, sexual knowledge at an early age, sexualized play and precocious or seductive behavior—excessive masturbation may be an indicator of sexual abuse. According to DSM-5-TR, "Delayed ejaculation is associated with highly frequent masturbation, use of masturbation techniques not easily duplicated by a partner, and marked disparities between sexual fantasies during masturbation and the reality of sex with a partner."

== Cultural history ==
=== Ancient world ===
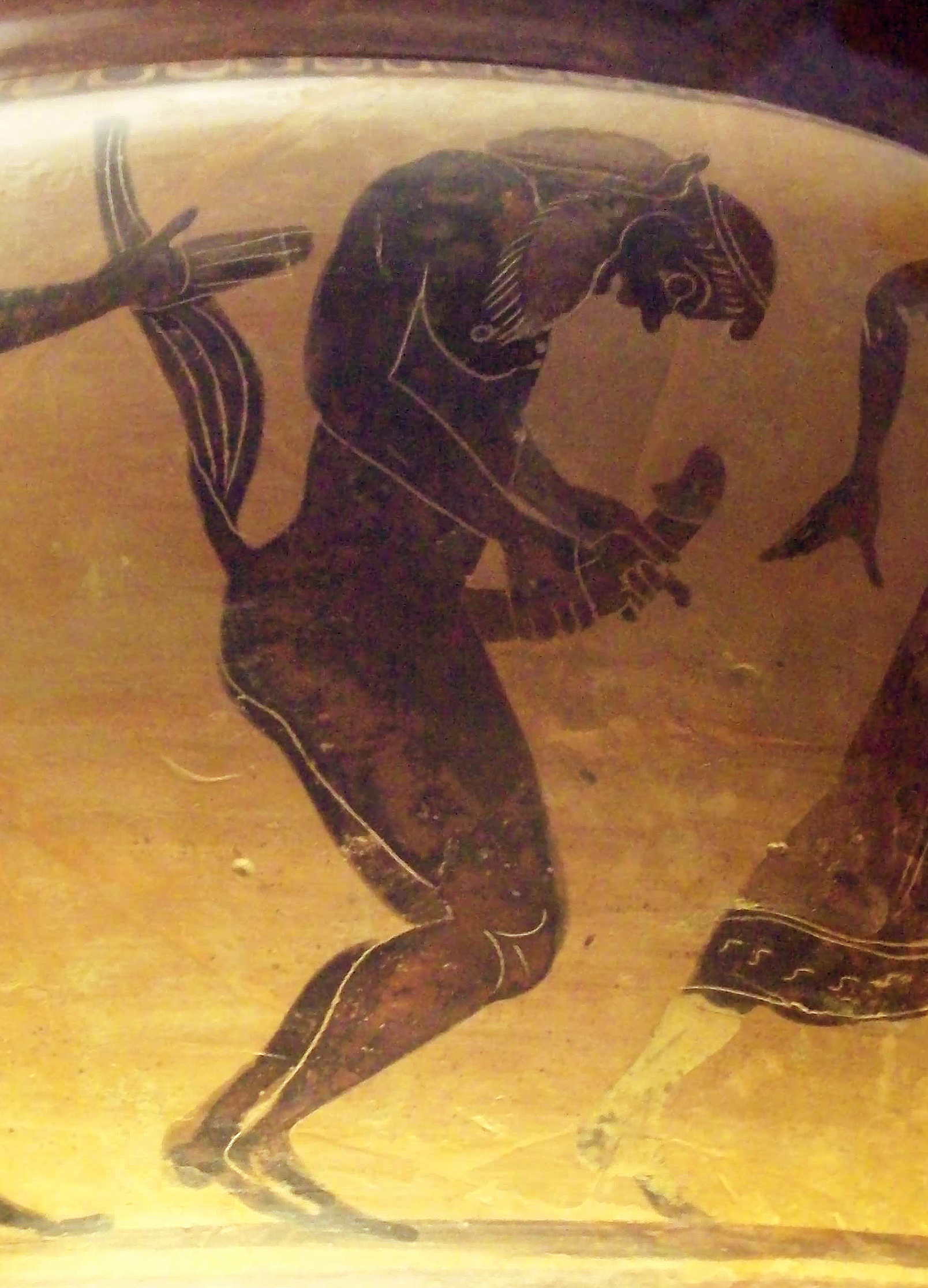
Detail of a krater, dating to c. 560–550 BC, showing a satyr masturbating, a common scene in many ancient Greek pottery paintings

The sexual stimulation of one's own genitals has been interpreted variously by different religions, the subject of legislation, social controversy, activism, as well as intellectual study in sexology. Social views regarding masturbation taboo have varied greatly in different cultures, and over history. There are depictions of male and female masturbation in prehistoric rock paintings around the world. From the earliest records, the ancient Sumerians had very relaxed attitudes toward sex. The Sumerians widely believed that masturbation enhanced sexual potency, both for men and for women, and they frequently engaged in it, both alone and with their partners. Men would often use puru-oil, a special oil probably mixed with pulverized iron ore intended to enhance friction. Masturbation was also an act of creation and, in Sumerian mythology, the god Enki was believed to have created the Tigris and Euphrates rivers by masturbating and ejaculating into their empty riverbeds. The ancient Egyptians also regarded masturbation by a deity as an act of creation; the god Atum was believed to have created the universe by masturbating to ejaculation.

The ancient Greeks also regarded masturbation as a normal and healthy substitute for other forms of sexual pleasure. Most information about masturbation in ancient Greece comes from surviving works of ancient Greek comedy and pottery. Masturbation is frequently referenced in the surviving comedies of Aristophanes, which are the most important sources of information on ancient Greek views on the subject. In ancient Greek pottery, satyrs are often depicted masturbating. According to the Lives and Opinions of Eminent Philosophers by the third-century AD biographer Diogenes Laërtius, Diogenes of Sinope, the fourth-century BC Cynic philosopher, often masturbated in public, which was considered scandalous. When people confronted him over this, he would say, "If only it were as easy to banish hunger by rubbing my belly."

Among non-Western perspectives on the matter, some teachers and practitioners of Traditional Chinese medicine, Taoist meditative and martial arts say that masturbation can cause a lowered energy level of the yang in men, but causes no harm to women with yin, even going further to introduce masturbating tools for women in books. Within the African Congo Basin, the Aka, Ngandu, Lesi, Brbs, and Ituri ethnic groups all lack a word for masturbation in their languages and are confused by the concept of masturbation.

=== Development of the contemporary Western world view ===
==== 18th century ====
Onanism is a hybrid term which combines the proper noun, Onan, with the suffix, -ism. Notions of self-pollution, impurity and uncleanness were increasingly associated with various other sexual vices and crimes of the body (such as fornication, sodomy, adultery, incest and obscene language); in reaction to the 17th-century libertine culture, middle-class moralists increasingly campaigned for a reformation of manners and a stricter regulation of the body. Paradoxically, a crime that was secret and private became a popular and fashionable topic. Moreover, writers tended to focus more on the perceived links with mental and physical illnesses that were deemed to be associated with the sense of moral outrage. Attention increasingly shifted to the prevention and cure of this illness which perilously sapped men of their virility. Prior to 1712, onanism was not much of a problem.

The first use of the word "onanism" to consistently and specifically refer to masturbation is a pamphlet first distributed in London in 1716, titled "Onania, or the Heinous Sin of Self-Pollution, and All Its Frightful Consequences, in Both Sexes, Considered, With Spiritual and Physical Advice for Those Who Have Already Injur'd Themselves by This Abominable Practice." The Online Etymology Dictionary, however, claims the earliest known use of onanism occurred in 1727. In 1743–1745, the British physician Robert James published A Medicinal Dictionary, in which he described masturbation as being "productive of the most deplorable and generally incurable disorders" and stated that "there is perhaps no sin productive of so many hideous consequences". One of the many horrified by the descriptions of malady in Onania was the notable Swiss physician Samuel-Auguste Tissot. In 1760, he published L'Onanisme, his own comprehensive medical treatise on the purported ill-effects of masturbation. Though Tissot's ideas are now considered conjectural at best, his treatise was presented as a scholarly, scientific work in a time when experimental physiology was practically nonexistent.

Immanuel Kant regarded masturbation as a violation of the moral law. In The Metaphysics of Morals (1797), he made the a posteriori argument that "such an unnatural use of one's sexual attribute" strikes "everyone upon his thinking of it" as "a violation of one's duty to himself", and suggested that it was regarded as immoral even to give it its proper name (unlike the case of the similarly undutiful act of suicide). He went on, however, to acknowledge that "it is not so easy to produce a rational demonstration of the inadmissibility of that unnatural use", but ultimately concluded that its immorality lay in the fact that "a man gives up his personality ... when he uses himself merely as a means for the gratification of an animal drive". His arguments were rejected as flawed by ethicists of the 20th and 21st centuries.

==== 19th century ====
By 1838, Jean Esquirol had declared in his Des Maladies Mentales that masturbation was "recognized in all countries as a cause of insanity". The medical literature of the time also described more invasive procedures including electric shock treatment, infibulation, restraining devices like chastity belts and straitjackets, cauterization or – as a last resort – wholesale surgical excision of the genitals. Medical attitudes toward masturbation began to change towards the end of the 19th century when H. Havelock Ellis, in his seminal 1897 work Studies in the Psychology of Sex, questioned Tissot's premises.

==== 20th century ====
In 1905, Sigmund Freud addressed masturbation in his Three Essays on the Theory of Sexuality and associated it with addictive substances. He described the masturbation of infants at the period when the infant is nursing, at four years of age, and at puberty. At the same time, the supposed medical condition of hysteria—from the Greek hystera or uterus—was being treated by what would now be described as medically administered or medically prescribed masturbation for women. In 1910, the meetings of the Vienna psychoanalytic circle discussed the moral or health effects of masturbation, but its publication on the matter was suppressed. "Concerning Specific Forms of Masturbation" is a 1922 essay by another Austrian, the psychiatrist and psychoanalyst Wilhelm Reich. In the seven and a half page essay Reich accepts the prevalent notions on the roles of unconscious fantasy and the subsequent emerging guilt feelings which he saw as originating from the act itself.

By 1930, F. W. W. Griffin, editor of The Scouter, had written in a book for Rover Scouts stating that the temptation to masturbate was "a quite natural stage of development" and, citing Ellis' work, held that "the effort to achieve complete abstinence was a very serious error." The work of sexologist Alfred Kinsey during the 1940s and 1950s, most notably the Kinsey Reports, insisted that masturbation was an instinctive behavior for both males and females. In 1961, The Encyclopedia of Sexual Behavior edited by Albert Ellis and Albert Abarbanel declared that masturbation is normal and healthy at any age. In the US, masturbation has not been a diagnosable condition since DSM II (1968). Circumcision was sometimes used as a prevention for masturbation, with some mainstream pediatric manuals in English-speaking countries continuing to recommend it as a deterrent against masturbation into the 1950s, and a 1970 edition of the standard US urology textbook said "Parents readily ... adopt measures which may avert masturbation. Circumcision is usually advised on these grounds."

In the 20th century (1962), the idea of "masturbatory insanity" has been attributed to irrational and unscientific hypotheses. In 1973, reflecting the shift in scientific consensus, Thomas Szasz stated: "Masturbation: the primary sexual activity of mankind. In the nineteenth century, it was a disease; in the twentieth, it's a cure." Dörner and others wrote in their now classic book (1978): "Self-satisfaction is therefore a priceless good for the success of sexual pleasure, but also for other partnership and sexual relationships: for only if I can offer something to myself can I also offer it to someone else. ... Not self-satisfaction, but feelings closely correlated with it need among others help through counseling, respectively therapy!" In the 1980s, Michel Foucault was arguing masturbation taboo was "rape by the parents of the sexual activity of their children". However, in 1994, when the surgeon general of the United States, Joycelyn Elders, said that it should be mentioned in school sex education curricula, as a side note, that masturbation is safe and healthy, she was forced to resign, with opponents asserting that she was promoting the teaching of how to masturbate.

==== 21st century ====
Thomas W. Laqueur stated: "Less clinical, less overtly political, the solitary vice of the imagination and of fantasy that had so terrified Rousseau had been transformed into a virtue: self-pleasuring was the path to self-knowledge, self-discovery, and spiritual well-being." Both practices and cultural views of masturbation have continued to evolve in the 21st century, partly because the contemporary lifeworld is increasingly technical. For example, digital photographs or live video may be used to share masturbatory experiences either in a broadcast format (possibly in exchange of money, as with performances by webcam models), or between members of a long-distance relationship. Teledildonics is a growing field. Masturbation has been depicted as a complicated part of "Love in the 21st Century" in the Channel 4 drama of the same name. In the 2020s, a "gooning" subculture centered around extended masturbation sessions emerged online. Participants build "gooncaves", rooms covered in projectors and TV screens playing pornography as well as pornographic posters, and showcasing them online.

== Views on masturbation ==
=== Stigma ===
Even though many medical professionals and scientists have found large amounts of evidence that masturbating is healthy and commonly practiced by males and females, stigma on the topic still persists today. In November 2013, Matthew Burdette, a 14-year-old boy in San Diego, committed suicide after a fellow student secretly made a video of him masturbating in a restroom stall, and published it.

In an article published by the nonprofit organization Planned Parenthood Federation of America, it was reported: "Proving that these ancient stigmas against masturbation are still alive and felt by women and men, researchers in 1994 found that half of the adult women and men who masturbate feel guilty about it (Laumann, et al., 1994. p.85). Another study in 2000 found that adolescent young men are still frequently afraid to admit that they masturbate (Halpern, et al., 2000, 327)."

=== Encouragement ===
In the UK in 2009, a leaflet was issued by the National Health Service in Sheffield carrying the slogan, "an orgasm a day keeps the doctor away". It also says: "Health promotion experts advocate five portions of fruit and veg a day and 30 minutes' physical activity three times a week. What about sex or masturbation twice a week?" This leaflet has been circulated to parents, teachers and youth workers and is meant to update sex education by telling older school students about the benefits of enjoyable sex. Its authors have said that for too long, experts have concentrated on the need for "safe sex" and committed relationships while ignoring the principal reason that many people have sex. The leaflet is entitled Pleasure. Instead of promoting teenage sex, it could encourage young people to delay losing their virginity until they are certain they will enjoy the experience, said one of its authors.

The Spanish region of Extremadura launched a program in 2009 to encourage "sexual self-exploration and the discovery of self-pleasure" in people aged from 14 to 17. The €14,000 campaign includes leaflets, flyers, a "fanzine", and workshops for the young in which they receive instruction on masturbation techniques along with advice on contraception and self-respect. The initiative, whose slogan is, "Pleasure is in your own hands" has angered local right-wing politicians and challenged traditional Roman Catholic views. Officials from the neighboring region of Andalucia have expressed an interest in copying the program.

The text book Palliative care nursing: quality care to the end of life states, "Terminally ill people are likely no different from the general population regarding their masturbation habits. Palliative care practitioners should routinely ask their patients if anything interferes in their ability to masturbate and then work with the patient to correct the problem if it is identified." The sex-positive movement argues for a supportive environment for masturbation. A 2016 review paper says that safe masturbation, in moderation (not excessive), is beneficial for heart health, and decreases risk of major adverse cardiovascular diseases. A 2019 research paper says that masturbation, in moderation, can improve sleep quality, especially when one or more orgasms occur during the activity.

=== Sperm donation ===
Male masturbation may be used as a method to obtain semen for third party reproductive procedures such as artificial insemination and in vitro fertilisation which may involve the use of either partner or donor sperm. At a sperm bank or fertility clinic, a special room or cabin may be set aside so that semen may be produced by male masturbation for use in fertility treatments such as artificial insemination. Most semen used for sperm donation, and all semen donated through a sperm bank by sperm donors, is produced in this way. The facility at a sperm bank used for this purpose is known as a masturbatorium (US) or men's production room (UK). A bed or couch is usually provided for the man, and pornographic films or other material may be made available.

=== Law ===
The prosecution of masturbation has varied at different times, from complete illegality to virtually unlimited acceptance. In a 17th-century law code for the Puritan colony of New Haven, Connecticut, blasphemers, homosexuals and masturbators were eligible for the death penalty. Often, masturbation in the sight of others is prosecuted under a general law such as public indecency, though some laws make specific mention of masturbation. In the UK, masturbating in public is illegal under Section 28 of the Town Police Clauses Act 1847. The penalty may be up to 14 days in prison, depending on a range of circumstantial factors. In the US, laws vary from state to state. In 2010, the Supreme Court of Alabama upheld a state law criminalizing the distribution of sex-toys. In the city of Charlotte, North Carolina, masturbating in public is a class 3 misdemeanor. In 2013, a male found masturbating openly on a beach in Sweden was cleared of charges of sexual assault, the court finding that his activities had not been directed towards any specific person.

There is debate whether masturbation should be promoted in correctional institutions. Restrictions on pornography, used to accompany masturbation, are common in American correctional facilities. Connecticut Department of Corrections officials say that these restrictions are intended to avoid a hostile work environment for correctional officers. Other researchers argue allowing masturbation could help prisoners restrict their sexual urges to their imaginations rather than engaging in prison rape or other non-masturbatory sexual activity that could pose sexually transmitted infection or other health risks.

=== Religious views ===
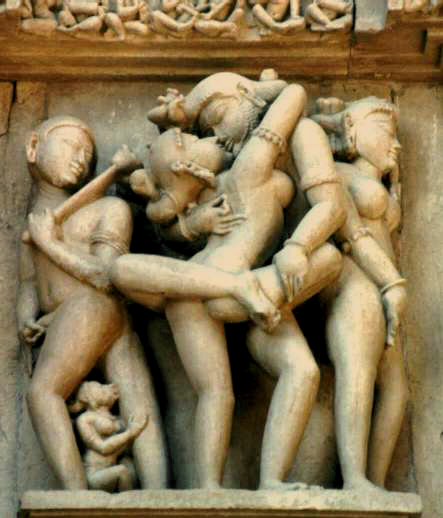
A temple relief at Khajuraho in Madhya Pradesh, India features a couple in a sexual embrace with a male and a female masturbating to either side.

Religions vary broadly in their views of masturbation, from considering it completely impermissible (for example in most forms of Christianity, most forms of Islam, and some sects of Judaism) to encouraging and refining it (as, for example, in some Dharmic, Neotantra, and Taoist sexual practices).

== In popular culture ==
=== Literature ===
The 1858 schoolboys' novel Eric, or, Little by Little was a tract against masturbation, but it did not mention the subject except extremely obliquely as "Kibroth-Hattaavah", a place mentioned in the Old Testament where those that lusted after meat were buried. In October 1972, an important censorship case was held in Australia, leading to the banning of Philip Roth's novel Portnoy's Complaint in that country due to its masturbation references. The censorship led to public outcry at the time.

Further portrayals and references to masturbation have occurred throughout literature, and the practice itself has even contributed to the production of literature among certain writers, such as Wolfe, Balzac, Flaubert and John Cheever. Perhaps the most famous fictional depiction of masturbation occurs in the "Nausicaa" episode of Ulysses by James Joyce. Here, the novel's protagonist Bloom brings himself to covert climax during a public fireworks display after being aroused by a young female's exhibitionism.

=== Music ===
In popular music, there are various songs that deal with masturbation. Some of the earliest examples are "My Ding-a-Ling" by Chuck Berry and "Mary Ann with the Shaky Hand" and "Pictures of Lily" by The Who. More recent popular songs include "Love Myself" by Hailee Steinfeld, "I Touch Myself" by the Divinyls, "Orgasm Addict" by the Buzzcocks, "Longview" by Green Day, "Touch of My Hand" by Britney Spears, "U + Ur Hand" by P!nk, "So Happy I Could Die" by Lady Gaga, "Darling Nikki" by Prince, and "She Bop" by Cyndi Lauper. "She Bop" was one of the first fifteen songs ever required to carry a Parental Advisory sticker for sexual content. In a 1993 interview on The Howard Stern Show, Lauper claimed she recorded the vocal track in the nude.

=== Film ===
In Monty Python's The Meaning of Life (1983), the song "Every Sperm Is Sacred" is a satire of Catholic teachings on reproduction that forbid masturbation (and contraception) by artificial means. In Talking Cock by comedian Richard Herring, the sketch is used to ridicule those who condemn masturbation (and sex) for any purpose other than procreation. In American Pie (1999), Nadia (Shannon Elizabeth) discovers Jim's (Jason Biggs) pornography collection and, while sitting on his bed half-naked, masturbates to it. In American Reunion (2012), Noah (Eugene Levy) attempts to explain the potential joys and difficulties of Jim explaining masturbation to his future son.

=== Television ===
In the Seinfeld episode "The Contest", the show's main characters enter into a contest to see who can go the longest without masturbating. Because Seinfeld's network, NBC, did not think masturbation was a suitable topic for prime-time television, the word is never used. Instead, the subject is described using a series of euphemisms. "Master of my domain" became a part of the American lexicon from this episode.

Another NBC show, Late Night with Conan O'Brien, had a character known as the Masturbating Bear, a costume of a bear with a diaper covering its genitals. The Masturbating Bear would touch his diaper to simulate masturbation. Prior to leaving Late Night to become host of The Tonight Show, Conan O'Brien originally retired the character due to concerns about its appropriateness in an earlier time slot. The Masturbating Bear, however, made his Tonight Show debut during the final days of Conan O'Brien's tenure as host of the Tonight Show. It was clear by then that Conan O'Brien was being removed from the show and he spent his last shows pushing the envelope with skits that typically would not be appropriate for the Tonight Show, one of which was the Masturbating Bear. After much debate on whether or not he would be able to be used on Conan O'Brien's new TBS show, Conan, the Masturbating Bear made an appearance on the first episode.

In March 2007, the UK broadcaster Channel 4 was to air a season of television programs about masturbation, called Wank Week. (Wank is a Briticism for masturbate.) The series came under public attack from senior television figures and was pulled amid claims of declining editorial standards and controversy over the channel's public service broadcasting credentials.

=== Pornography ===
Depictions of male and female masturbation are common in pornography, including gay pornography. Am Abend (1910), one of the earliest pornographic films that have been collected at the Kinsey Institute for Research in Sex, Gender, and Reproduction, starts with a female masturbation scene. Solo performances in gay pornography have been described in 1985 as "either or both active (tense, upright) and/or passive (supine, exposed, languid, available)", whereas female solo performances are said to be "exclusively passive (supine, spread, seated, squatted, orifices offered, etc.)". Solo pornography recognized with AVN Awards include the All Alone series and All Natural: Glamour Solos.

== Other animals ==
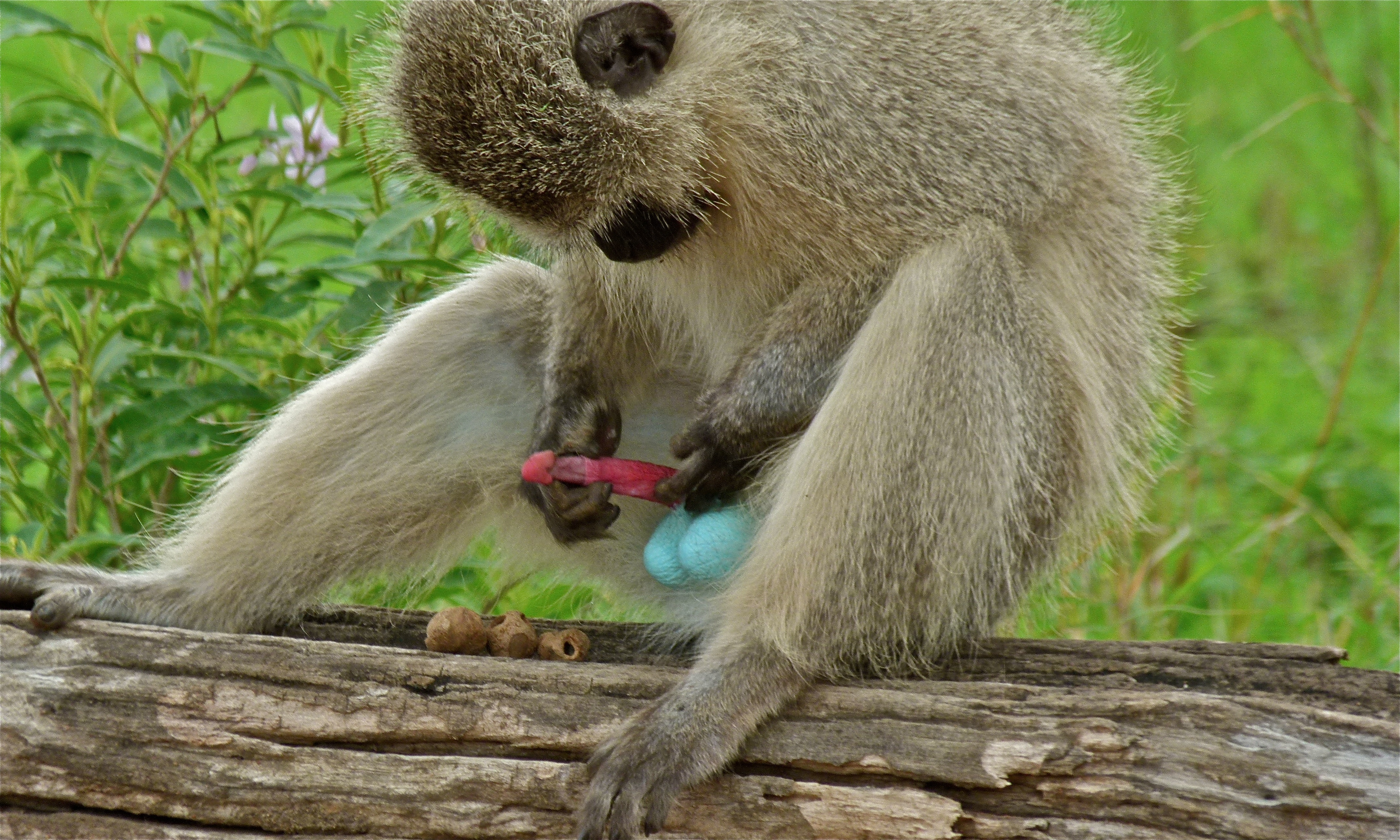
A male vervet monkey masturbating

Masturbatory behavior has been documented in a very wide range of species. Individuals of some species have been known to create tools for masturbation purposes. Many animals, both male and female, masturbate, both when partners are available and otherwise. For example, it has been observed in cats, dogs, male Cape ground squirrels, male deer, rhinoceroses, boars, male monkeys, cetaceans, and otters.

== See also ==
- Adult video arcade
- Cum shot
- International Masturbation Month
- Jugum penis
- Nocturnal emission
- Phone sex
- Self-love
- Sex doll
- Sex magic
- Sexual assistance
- Venus Butterfly
