= Bend Over Boyfriend 2 =

1999 American pornographic film

- Front cover
- Directed by: Shar Rednour; Jackie Strano
- Written by: Shar Rednour; Jackie Strano
- Produced by: Shar Rednour; Jackie Strano
- Starring: Chloe Nicole; Carol Queen
- Production company: S.I.R Video
- Release date: 1999 (United States)
- Running time: 76 minutes
- Country: United States
- Language: English

Bend Over Boyfriend 2, or Bend Over Boyfriend 2: More Rockin', Less Talkin', is a 1999 American pornographic film written, directed and produced by lesbian couple Shar Rednour and Jackie Strano. A sequel to their 1998 film Bend Over Boyfriend, the film stars Chloe Nicole and Carol Queen, alongside several amateur newcomers.

The plot centers on fans of the original film exploring pegging, along with other sexual acts, featuring four couples and a female-female-male threesome. The film was shot in April 1999 and released in the same year.

== Plot ==
At Good Vibrations store, a long queue of customers waits to get their Bend Over Boyfriend copies autographed. Roxie, a reporter, covers it and interviews couples.

As Roxie interviews the first couple, the man reveals that he heard about the film from his brother-in-law, while the woman adds that his sister loves it, and playfully spanks him. At home, the couple becomes intimate—beginning with cunnilingus and blowjob, followed by missionary intercourse. Eventually, the woman introduces a strap-on, and they explore pegging for the first time, with the man on top. He tells her that she should have told it earlier. They kiss at the end.

Next, a short-haired woman purchases lubricant. At home, she dons lingerie and a strap-on. When a cop enters, she raises her hands. Upon noticing the strap-on, he kneels and begins sucking it. She thrust into his mouth aggressively while calling him a "pig". The officer reveals a hidden camisole beneath his uniform, which she teases. As they kiss, he rubs his pistol against her dildo. She pegs him forcefully from behind, using his tonfa to pull him closer, continuing to call him "pig". She alternates between aggressiveness and tenderness, such as kissing his neck, before she exhausts him with intensified thrusting.

Roxie then interviews a gay couple, who praise the film for its educational value. She then meets a bobbed-haired woman and her partner. At their home, the man licks her shoes before being led into a pony play scenario. She fits a bridle and blickers to his head, treating him as a stubborn mount and riding him by rubbing her vagina against him. She plays with his ponytail butt plug and grabs his ringed balls. While he lies on his back, she fingers his ass and makes him taste her vaginal fluid. Then, she uses a strap-on to enter him but refuses to thrust, forcing him to beg. Desperate, he initiates the movement himself, pushing onto the dildo. When finished, she kisses him.

Roxie approaches Carol Queen and asks if she reprises her famous pegging scene. Queen confirms. Her segment features a threesome with a female fan and a collared male submissive. The fan rides Queen's strap-on while the man licks her shoes. The fan wears a double-ended strap-on, and the man is made to suck their dildos concurrently. Queen unzips his leather pants, exposing his ringed balls and anus. The fan pegs him from behind while he sucks Queen's dildo. The women later switch roles. It culminates with Queen moaning in orgasm.

In a final vignette, a woman reminds her husband of their earlier discussion about switching roles. He realizes she's wearing a strap-on under her hotpants, feels it, and kisses her. In bed, he sucks her dildo. After he removes her pants and spanks her, she kneels and thrusts her dildo into his mouth. She expresses feeling "manly"; he replies that he feels "womanly", then passionately sucks her dildo. He kisses while stroking her dildo. She stimulates his anus with her tongue as he kneels on all-fours. Calling him her "bitch-boy", she spits on and fingers his anus, encouraging him to thrust against her hand. She then begins to penetrate him with her vibrating strap-on, letting him move at his own pace. Soon she takes charge, thrusting herself. He touch his penis. He attempt to turn around with her dildo still inside, making her laugh. She sits back, legs folded and spread, as he thrusts by lifting his pelvis.

In missionary, she penetrates him harder and chokes him gently. He raises and holds his legs, which she finds amusing. She strokes his penis and spreads his legs further. Pausing, gazes down at him with satisfaction and shares her excitement. She asks him to remove her harness, and they kiss. Climbing atop him with intimacy, she transitions into giving him a blowjob. Afterward, she kisses him and says, "It's time. Take me. I'm yours". Lying back, she receives missionary intercourse. He kisses her and bites her nipples, and request to penetrate her anally, which she declines. Despite his continued persuasion, she repeats "no". When he reminds her of his earlier submission, she teasingly asks if his intent is to show his manliness. Nevertheless, she sits on his penis anally, bobbing in a squatting position.

== Cast ==
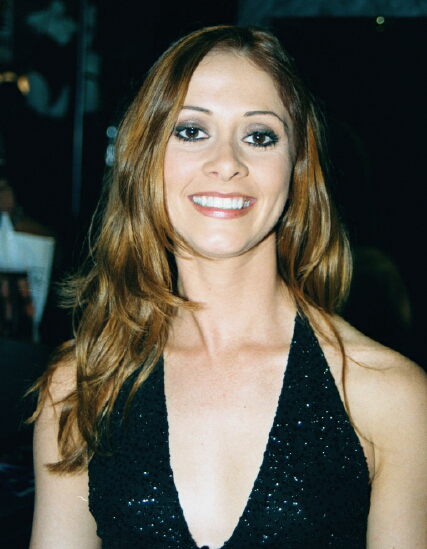
Chloe Nicole was the only professional pornographic actress cast in the film.

- Chloe Nicole
- Carol Queen
- Olive Blue
- Daphne
- Roxie Santoro
- Scott Blue
- Butch
- Troy Trixxx

== Production ==
Bend Over Boyfriend 2 was written, directed, and produced by feminist sex activists and butch-femme couple Shar Rednour and Jackie Strano, aimed at the mainstream heterosexual market. With this film, Rednour and Strano also founded their own production company, S.I.R Video. The sequel was made with the permission of Nan Kinney of Fatale Media, who had produced the first film. Unlike the first film, Bend Over Boyfriend 2 followed what Rednour described as a "radically different process for casting than the first one". Through word-of-mouth, they largely relied on their "network of sex-savvy associates of friends, which included local prostitutes and dominatrixes". Their criteria was to cast individuals "passionate about sex and about promoting queer imagery". According to Strano, they reached out to "every sex positive feminist store from coast to coast to find distributors".

The film was shot in April 1999 and was intended as a couples-oriented pornographic production. With the exception of Chloe Nicole, the cast consisted entirely of amateurs, some of whom were volunteers. Performers were required to undergo HIV testing. Nicole's on-screen husband was played by Jack, a mutual friend of Rednour and Strano, making his debut in porn film. On casting him, Rednour remarked, "He's part of our tribe, I can trust him," adding, "he's got a pretty cock,". Jack plays a doting and romantic husband who, along with his wife, take turns to penetrate each other. The film also marks Nicole's debut strap-on performance. One performer, who came from a family of police officers, requested a fantasy scene in which he would arrest his girlfriend for streetwalking—only for her to turn the tables and anally penetrate him before they reached the precinct. Reflecting on their work years later, in 2015, Strano described the porn films they made as "feminist manifestos".

== Release ==
Bend Over Boyfriend 2 was released in 1999. In 2010, HotMovies.com and HotMoviesForHer.com bought the digital streaming rights for both the films in the series.

== Reception ==
Veronica Vera noted that both films in the series are "best-selling" and remarked: "Such videos and DVDs are great ways for you to share your until-now secret fantasies with a partner". Calling it a "nueva porn", an AVN critic stated that although the film is "exceptional on so many levels", it lacks "reasonable heat" from the performers, and more attention should have been given to camera movements. Sasha of Eye Weekly wrote that the sequel is "less chatty and features anal-porn-queen Chloe in a cool role reversal, but my anti-touchy-feely, East Coast sensibilities still bristle. The point of the BOB videos seems to be to bring female-to-male anal sex to every couple, but the message is marred by the medium".

In 2002, Dan Savage wrote that he would recommend the film to anyone interested in pegging, calling it "a great educational video–the Nightline of how-to-fuck-your-boyfriend's-ass videos". Claire Cavanah, co-founder of Babeland, also endorsed the film. The online edition of The Swarthmore Phoenix noted that the film "brings this [pegging] theme to the forefront. Yes, we see male anal pleasure, but the woman has taken charge as both consumer and penetrator".
