= Theresa Sparks =

American politician and entrepreneur

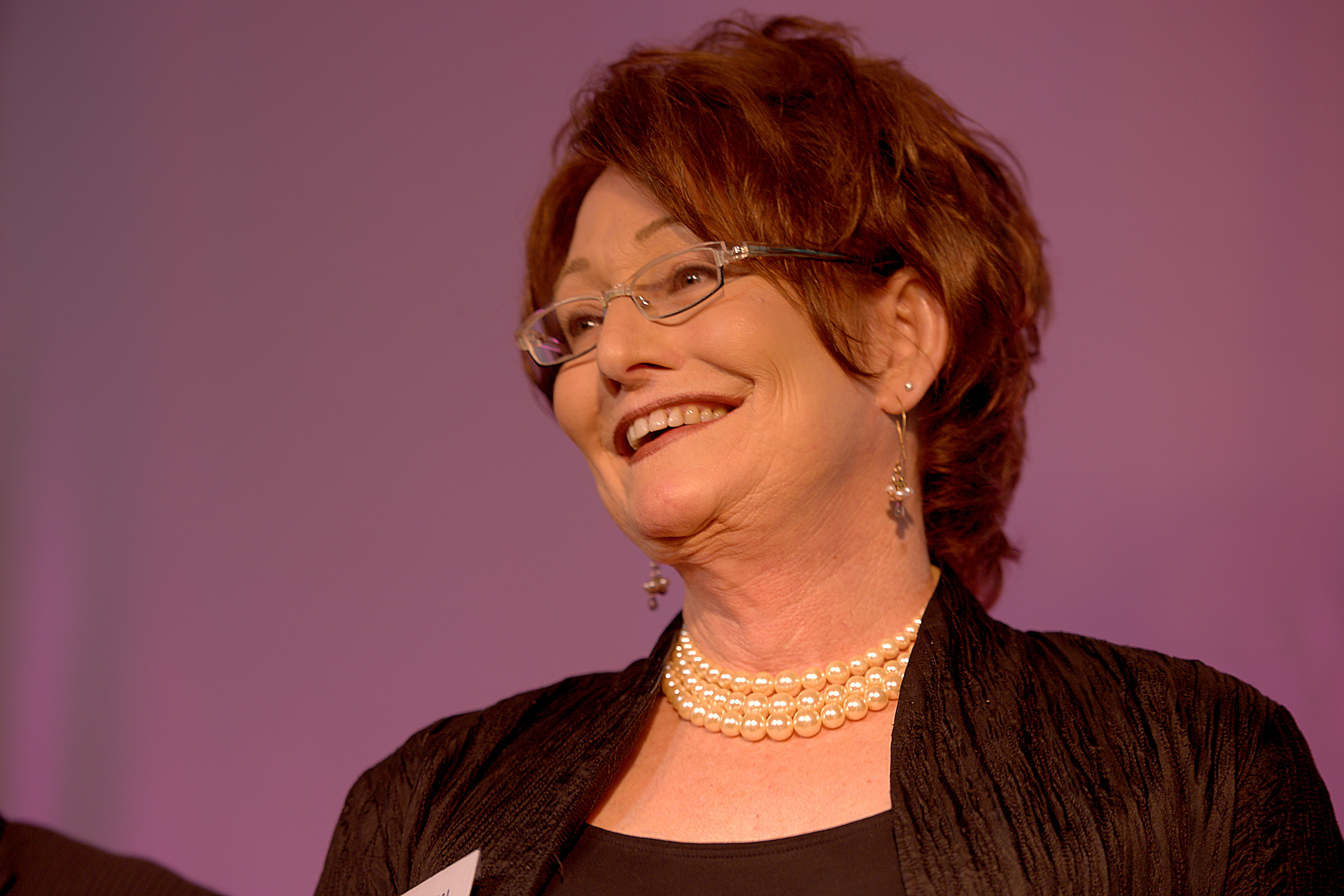
- Sparks in 2010
- Born: April 8, 1949 (age 77); Kansas City, Kansas, U.S.
- Education: Engineering, Kansas State University
- Occupations: CEO, Good Vibrations; president, San Francisco Police Commission
- Spouse: twice divorced
- Children: one daughter and two sons

Theresa Sparks (born April 8, 1949) is an American business executive and politician who is executive director of the San Francisco Human Rights Commission and was a candidate for San Francisco Supervisor for District 6 in the November 2010 election. She is a former president of the San Francisco Police Commission and former CEO of Good Vibrations. She is also one of San Francisco's most famous transgender women and was a Grand Marshal in the 2008 San Francisco Pride Parade.

Sparks is also a member of the Emeritus Board of the Alice B. Toklas LGBT Democratic Club, a Navy veteran and a trained engineer. She is a member of the board of directors of the Horizons Foundation, a community-based LGBT philanthropic organization.

== Early life ==
Theresa Sparks was born on April 8, 1949, in Kansas City, Kansas, where she grew up. Assigned male at birth, Sparks expressed her gender identity at an early age by wearing women's clothing, though she later resisted these impulses in adolescence.

Sparks went to Kansas State University and graduated with a degree in engineering. She served in the United States Navy. Later she managed several waste management and recycling companies and patented two recycling techniques.

She married her first wife in 1971 and together they had three children: two sons and a daughter. After nine years of marriage, Sparks finally revealed to her wife her desire to live as a woman. They separated shortly after and eventually divorced. Sparks remarried, but that marriage also ended in divorce.

Sparks underwent "intense therapy and an electric shock treatment" to try to suppress her femininity, before deciding at last to embrace her gender identity. "It's an unusual condition, but it's not unnatural," she said later. "You discover that the only way to live with it is to transition physically so your physical appearance matches how you feel about yourself."

== Transitioning ==
By 1997, Sparks moved to San Francisco, California, where she felt she could more easily adjust to life as a woman.

But even there, in a city known as one of the most transgender-friendly in the country, Sparks faced challenges as a transgender woman. Despite 20 years of experience in waste management and managing three environmental consulting companies as a man, Sparks struggled to find an occupation in San Francisco as a woman. She applied unsuccessfully for more than 100 jobs. Sparks eventually acquired sporadic work as a cab driver, bank teller, and census taker to avoid becoming homeless.

One evening while walking through the Tenderloin neighborhood of San Francisco, an area known to be strolled by transgender sex workers, Sparks said she was harassed by a police officer, who demanded to see her identification and questioned what she was doing there. "[The police] assume if there's a transgender person walking down the street in the Tenderloin it's probably because they're prostitutes," she later said about the experience.

== Activism ==
Not long after her arrival in San Francisco, Sparks immersed herself in the San Francisco political landscape. Frustrated with the obstacles she and other transgender people were facing such as employment and housing discrimination, anti-transgender violence, police harassment, and a lack of affordable medical treatment, she helped organize a group of transgender activists to lobby the San Francisco Board of Supervisors. In 1999 they formed the Transgender Political Caucus (TPC) and campaigned to elect members of the San Francisco Board of Supervisors who would fight for transgender civil rights.

Sparks became the chair of the nascent transgender activist group, TG Rage, and in 1999 organized the very first Transgender Day of Remembrance to memorialize those transgender men and women who lost their lives to transphobic violence. Held in the Harvey Milk Plaza of the Castro District, the Transgender Day of Remembrance grew into an annual event honored around the world every November.

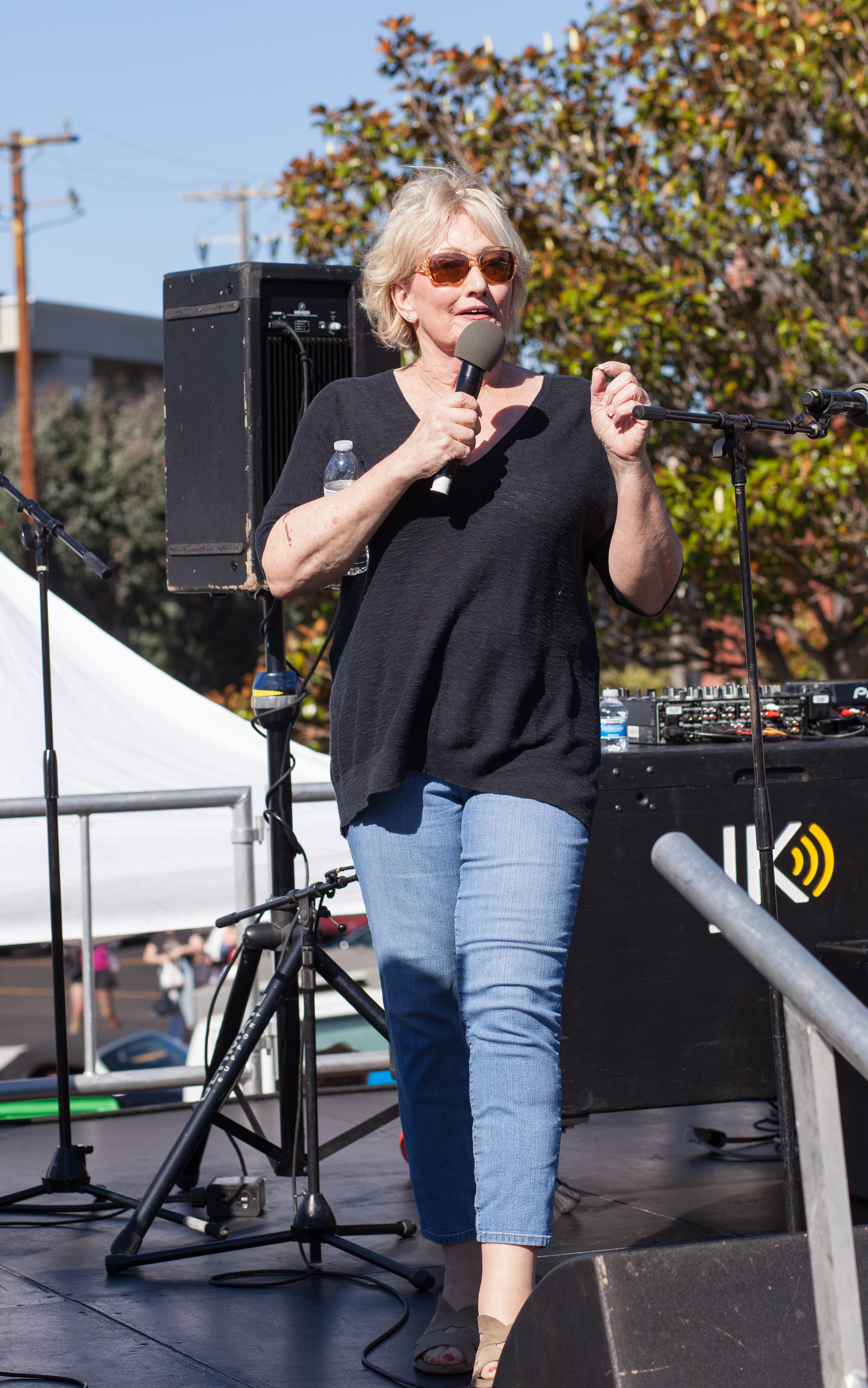
Sparks speaks at the San Francisco Trans March, June 2016.

=== Public Service ===
In 2000, Sparks' activism prompted Supervisor Mark Leno to create a new city work group, the Transgender Civil Rights Implementation Task Force, of which Sparks became a charter member. A year later, Sparks and Leno helped to establish broader medical benefits for municipal employees diagnosed with Gender dysphoria. The new law was the only governmental policy of its kind in the nation and provided medical coverage for hormone therapy and sex reassignment surgery.

Mayor Willie Brown appointed Sparks to chair the LGBT Advisory Committee of the San Francisco Human Rights Commission in early 2001, making her the commission's first-ever transgender appointee. Sparks used her position to lobby for a new transgender-sensitivity training program for county police officers, which the San Francisco Police Department (SFPD) on August 10, 2001, agreed to produce. The program includes specific guidelines for how to treat transgender people and how to appropriately document cases involving transgender people. She served on the commission for two four-year terms.

On June 16, 2016, San Francisco Mayor Ed Lee appointed Sparks as senior advisor on transgender initiatives.

=== Police Commission ===
Impressed with Sparks' public service, the San Francisco Board of Supervisors appointed Sparks a police commissioner, and she was sworn in on April 30, 2004, by Mayor Gavin Newsom. She served for two years as the commission vice president until May 24, 2006, when she voluntarily declined to reapply for that position: the San Francisco Chronicle reported Sparks "slam[med]" her fellow commissioners, citing the Police Commission's lack of progress in addressing the city's high murder rate, loss of SFPD staff, and low police morale.

On May 9, 2007, Sparks made history yet again when she was elected president of the San Francisco Police Commission by a single vote, making her the first transgender person ever to be elected president of any San Francisco commission and San Francisco's highest ranking transgender official. The deciding vote was cast by Commissioner Joe Alioto Veronese, which came as a surprise to many observers who expected the Newsom-appointee to back Joe Marshall, the candidate Newsom preferred. Newsom himself was reportedly stunned.

"Theresa defines trailblazer," Cecilia Chung told the San Francisco Bay Times shortly after the election. Chung, deputy director of the Transgender Law Center and a member of the San Francisco Human Rights Commission, saw Sparks election as a landmark moment for transgender people in the city. "Her brilliance and dedication continue to open doors for transgender people throughout San Francisco and the state. She represents a strong, committed voice for our community on issues of police reform and oversight; and this election is a clear indicator of the increasing number of leadership opportunities that are open to more and more community members."

== Good Vibrations ==
Sparks found some temporary work in 2001 in the shipping department of the worker-owned sex toy company Good Vibrations. The general manager of Good Vibrations, Beth Doyle, quickly recognized Sparks' management skills and hired her as a financial manager when the position became available three months later.

Doyle left the company in April 2005, frustrated with the constraints of the co-op business structure, and the board of Good Vibrations elected Sparks to be the new general manager. On February 1, 2006, under Sparks' leadership, the board voted unanimously to drop Good Vibration's co-op structure but retain its progressive business roots. Sparks herself was the main instigator of the change. "We researched Whole Foods, Ben & Jerry's, and others. All these companies have progressive values, but they're not co-ops," Sparks' explained to a reporter later. "Something had to give." Shares of the newly structured company were split evenly.

However, Good Vibrations' Internet sales, which had initially been successful and at one time accounted for two thirds of its income, began to suffer as mass-market retailers Amazon.com and Drugstore.com began to carry adult merchandise. The company also faced competition from small independent adult entertainment websites. Facing a cash crisis, the company appealed on its website for potential investors to enable it to buy inventory for the 2007 holiday season. In September, 2007, the company was purchased by adult novelty wholesaler GVA-TWN, which also owns 50 adult retail stores in the Midwest and affiliate program PECash.

Before the sale, the board of directors included Sparks, Margaret Cho, Donna Daniels, Charlie Glickman, Carol Queen, Linda Shaw and James Williamson. Both companies announced that there were no immediate plans to lay off workers or change the company's management.

At a speech commemorating the Compton's Cafeteria riot, Sparks said her company was "one of the top U.S. employers of transgenders" and "proud to continue the fight for transgender equality."

== Woman of the Year ==
In 2003, Theresa Sparks became the first transgender woman ever named "Woman of the Year" by the California State Assembly. Assemblyman Mark Leno, Sparks' friend and a fellow activist for transgender civil rights, said he selected Sparks for the award, not only to honor her advocacy on behalf of the LGBT community, but to humanize a transgender civil rights bill he introduced earlier that year. Assembly Bill 196, which was signed into law by Governor Gray Davis later that year, amended the California Fair Employment and Housing Act, making it illegal to discriminate in employment or housing decisions on the basis of transgender status or gender stereotypes.

Jay Leno angered the National Transgender Advocacy Coalition (NTAC) after making jokes about Sparks' award on a March 31, 2003, broadcast of his talk show, The Tonight Show. During his opening monologue, Leno quipped, "The California Assembly awarded a man who had a sex change as its Woman of the Year. When he accepted the award, he said there was a part of him that didn't want to accept it — but that's gone now."

The NTAC's executive director, Vanessa Edwards Foster, criticized Leno's comments as dehumanizing. "In a country where no positive accomplishments of transgender people are ever reported it's curious that belittling humor of these same people is openly welcomed," Forster said. "Leno's remarks took an historic recognition for a transgender community leader and summarily diminished it with insensitive humor." The NTAC also criticized Leno for using male pronouns to refer to Sparks.

The LGBT Advisory Committee of the San Francisco Human Rights Commission reported at a meeting on April 15 that Jay Leno had apologized to Mark Leno for his comments. Minutes of the meeting also recorded that "national organizations have been responding to Mr. Leno without conferring with Commissioner Sparks first".

== Awards and honors ==
- Honor Roll of LGBT Elected and Appointed Officials, Horizons Foundation (2004)
- Community Service Award, Alice B. Toklas LGBT Democratic Club (2001)
- Honorary grand marshal, San Francisco Pride (2001)

== See also ==
- LGBT culture in San Francisco
- List of transgender public officeholders in the United States
