= Bend Over Boyfriend =

1998 instructional sex video

- Poster
- Directed by: Shar Rednour
- Written by: Shar Rednour
- Produced by: Nan Kinney
- Starring: Carol Queen; Robert Morgan
- Cinematography: Karen Everett
- Edited by: Karen Everett
- Music by: Jackie Strano; Debbie Torrey
- Production company: Fatale Media
- Release date: April 1998
- Running time: 60 minutes
- Country: United States
- Language: English

Bend Over Boyfriend is a 1998 American pornographic film directed by Shar Rednour and produced by Nan Kinney. Intended for heterosexual couples, the film provides guidance on female-to-male anal penetration using a strap-on dildo. It features Carol Queen and Robert Morgan as themselves, along with two additional couples, combining explicit demonstrations with instructional commentary.

In 1998, Bend Over Boyfriend became the fastest selling video ever for Good Vibrations, a sex-toy business. It was nominated for Best Specialty Release at the 1999 AVN Awards. The video was featured on The Daily Show. In 1999, a sequel, Bend Over Boyfriend 2, was released.

== Plot ==
Sex educator Carol Queen introduce the act of female-to-male anal penetration using a strap-on dildo, with her real-life male partner Robert Morgan Lawrence. Couples watching this instructions at home, tries it for the first time. The video leads to Queen demonstrating the act herself by penetrating Lawrence.

== Cast ==
- Carol Queen as Herself
- Robert Morgan Lawrence as Himself
- Laura Goodhue
- Cupcake Jones
- M
- Troy
- Miss Behavin as Herself (guest appearance)

== Production ==
Jackie Strano and Shar Rednour, the creators behind the lesbian pornography company SIR Video Productions, conceived the Bend Over Boyfriend while working at the Good Vibrations retail sex toy store in the late 1990s. It was directed by Rednour with Strano as assistant director. Produced by Nan Kinney, president of Fatale Media, a lesbian pornography company, Kinney was then part of the sex positive feminism movement.

In an interview, when asked about the irony of lesbian pornographer making a film for heterosexual people, Kinney said that "I do love the irony in it! Well, who better than lesbians to show straight gals how to strap it on? [...] Our goal had always been to cover sexual subjects in a way that mainstream porn wasn't, and this fit that goal". For performers, they recruited real-life couples through Craigslist. Rednour commented that, although Bend Over Boyfriend was meant for heterosexual couples, she cast lesbians in penetrator roles because "dykes are more likely to know how to fuck". On her experience working in Bend Over Boyfriend series, Rednour later commented: "I loved directing the BOB movies. Seeing the guys getting so into it and saying, 'Wow this is great. Why didn't I try this sooner?' On set, Carol and I would just smile,".

== Reception ==
=== Critical response ===
Sasha from Eye Weekly wrote: "Its underlying message, that fucking your boyfriend in the ass is fun, is a good one", but the presentation "made anal sex seem more distasteful rather than more attractive". Feminist author Susie Bright praised the film on Salon.com, writing that "it couldn't be more user-friendly: part sex education, part erotic show", the lovers "demonstrate with great flair how anal sex doesn't have to hurt (anymore than toast needs to burn)". In 2008, she said: "I loved when the Bend Over Boyfriend series started. Finally, there was a situation where men could talk about being the recipient of anal sex from women".

Tristan Taormino, writing for the Village Voice, credits the video as an archetype for a substantial cultural shift: "The roles of active initiator and penetrator are no longer solely the domain of men, nor are the qualities of receptivity and passivity for girls only. Nowhere is this more apparent than in what I identify as the Bend Over Boyfriend Archetype." AVN magazine wrote that "it never gets dull, thanks to some well-edited and humorous visual demonstrations".

In 2000, Melinda Gallagher and Emily Kramer of Vice called it a "clear choice for female-powered experimentation" and that "watching women strap one on as their boy-toys beg for more received a thumbs up all around". In 2023, Naomi Leroy writing for Fleshbot, called it a classic, adding that "all of the information in this film is actually great anal advice for anyone looking to play with buttholes, no matter the gender of the giver or receiver". April Dembosky of KQED called it a "feminist porn film".

Pride.com editor called it "a legendary instructional video that helps women fuck their boy-toys from behind". PinkLabel.TV wrote: "Laced with humor and common sense, Bend Over Boyfriend is perfect for any couple wanting to explore new sexual territory and discover the secrets of anal sex that lead to ecstasy".

=== Sales ===
In 1998, Bend Over Boyfriend became the fastest selling video ever for Good Vibrations, a sex-toy business. In the years followed, it was the best-selling tape and the top rental.

== Accolades ==
The film was nominated for Best Specialty Tape—Other Genre category at the 16th AVN Awards (1999).

== Sequel ==
A sequel, Bend Over Boyfriend 2, was released in (1999). Porn star Chloe appears in the second video; as she is best known as an anal queen, her use of a strap-on dildo is a "role reversal". Queen said she was told the first video was "like watching a driving-instruction video", and the sequel, named Bend Over Boyfriend 2: Less Talkin', More Rockin', attempts to address this concern.

== Legacy ==
Following its release, the act of female-on-male anal penetration became "much more mainstream". Dan Savage, who popularized the term pegging, originally offered "bob" (short for "Bend over Boyfriend") as one of two alternatives for the term. The film is often credited by the media for popularizing pegging to mainstream audience. In 1999, while criticizing sodomy laws, feminist journalist Debbie Nathan cited the success of Bend Over Boyfriend and imagined a scenario where "sex police" busts on a "PTA mom while she's reaming the man of the house with her strap-on", suggesting that "when that happens, the rest of the sodomy laws surely will fall".

In 2010, AVN wrote that the Bend Over Boyfriend series was "the first to tackle the taboo erotic art of anal pleasure for men". In 2008, Violet Blue wrote that the film "hit shelves at exactly the point (literally) in the late '90s that an ever-growing number of the het populace was looking for just such a re-invention. It sold like hotcakes, or hot buns, or hot leather harnesses". Sociologist Mimi Schippers in her book Beyond Monogamy: Polyamory and the Future of Polyqueer Sexualities (2019) stated that the film does "a sort of cultural work in terms of eroticizing queer and penetrable hetero-masculinities."
