= Center for Sex & Culture =

San Francisco non-profit

The Center for Sex & Culture was a non-profit located in San Francisco, California, U.S.. It closed its brick and mortar location in January 2019.

== Mission ==
The Mission of the Center for Sex & Culture was to provide judgment-free education, cultural events, a library/media archive, and other resources to audiences across the sexual and gender spectrum; and to research and disseminate factual information, framing and informing issues of public policy and public health.

The Center for Sex & Culture aimed to provide a community center for education, advocacy, research, and support to the widest range of people. It was also engaged in several fiscal sponsorships with artists, educators, and organizations.

== Founders ==
=== Carol Queen ===
Dr. Carol Queen is a writer and cultural sexologist with a Ph.D. in human sexuality. She is a noted essayist whose work has appeared in dozens of anthologies. Her essay collection, Real Live Nude Girl: Chronicles of Sex-Positive Culture, was published in 1997 and reissued in 2002; it is read in university classes across America.

Her erotic stories can be found in several Best American Erotica volumes, among many other anthologies; her erotic novel The Leather Daddy and the Femme was published in 1998 and won a Firecracker Alternative Book Award the following year. A “director’s cut” edition with new material came out in 2003. Her first book, Exhibitionism for the Shy, published in 1995, explores issues of erotic self-esteem and enhancement and will be reissued with new material in 2009.

She is co-editor of the anthologies Best Bisexual Erotica (volumes One and Two), Sex Spoken Here, Switch Hitters, and PoMoSexuals; the latter won a Lambda Literary Award in 1998. She's also edited Whipped! and two volumes of 5 Minute Erotica, short-short erotic fiction. She has appeared in several explicit educational videos, notably “Carol Queen’s Great Vibrations: An Explicit Consumer Tour of Vibrators” and “Bend Over Boyfriend: An Adventurous Couple’s Guide to Male Anal Pleasure.” She's the writer and presenter of “G Marks the Spot: The Good Vibrations Guide to the G-Spot and Female Ejaculation.”

Queen works as staff sexologist and Chief Cultural Officer at Good Vibrations, the women-founded sex toy and bookstore in San Francisco, where she has worked since 1990, and blogs for the Good Vibrations web magazine.

She has addressed numerous scholarly and professional conferences, including the Society for the Scientific Study of Sexuality, the International Condom Conference, the International Conference on Prostitution, and the International Conference on Pornography; she frequently addresses college as well as general and specialized audiences. In February 2009 she debated the question of promiscuity (“Virtue or vice?”) for the Oxford Union at University of Oxford, England.

Carol Queen is active on behalf of progressive sex education and sexual minority issues. Perhaps most closely affiliated with the bisexual and sex work communities, she has been speaking publicly about non-mainstream sexualities, from lesbian to leather, for over 25 years. Her perspective in addressing sexual diversity incorporates personal experience, accurate sex information, and informed cultural commentary.

=== Robert Lawrence ===
Dr. Robert Morgan Lawrence has 38 years of experience in the field of sex education. He has a Doctorate of Education degree in Human Sexuality and holds a second doctorate degree in health care. He has served as a sex industry consultant, educator and academic author and lectures both nationally and internationally about human sexuality and health.

Lawrence has covered diverse sexuality-related topics during his decades of public speaking. He has been a guest lecturer at many colleges and universities, including San Francisco State University, Stanford University, UC Berkeley, UC Davis, Sonoma State University, the Institute for Advanced Study of Human Sexuality, and the University of Chicago, and has appeared in places as far-flung as Amsterdam, London and Beijing. Lawrence has produced and designed safer-sex education events of many kinds, and has been active as a safer-sex educator since 1980. In San Francisco he worked with The Coalition for Healthy Sex to allow consensual adult sex to become legitimate after the sex club closures in 1984. His professional work has been published in juried journals, magazines and books, and he has interviewed on radio and television programs worldwide, including Phil Donahue, Penn and Teller, Montel Williams, Playboy TV and Channel 4 of London. His work and applied sex education praxis have reached millions of people worldwide and are still in use today at events and clubs across the nation.

Since 1999, Robert has been disabled with a chronic pain condition as a result of a surgical complication. He continues to serve on the Center for Sex & Culture's Board of Directors, although he is not able to participate fully in its events and operations and has limited mobility. He also makes collage art, solo and with Carol Queen, some of which has been shown at San Francisco galleries, most notably Femina Potens. He partners with Dr. Carol Queen and Ms. Dina Fayer.
