= Pegging (sexual practice) =

Use of a strap-on dildo to penetrate another person's anus

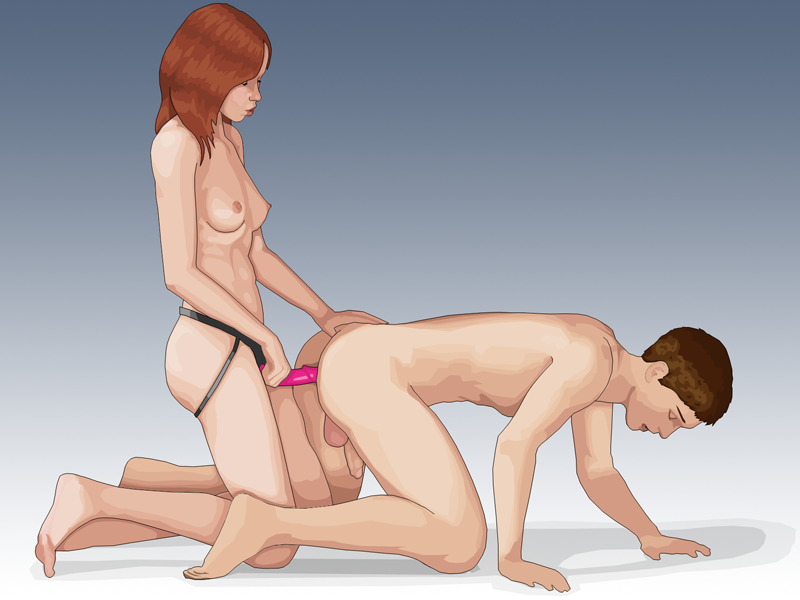
A woman pegging a man in the doggy style position

Pegging is an anal sex act in which a woman penetrates a man's anus with a strap-on dildo. The term was popularized by Dan Savage in 2001 to describe a practice that predates the term. Pegging has become more visible in the 21st century through sex education, feminist and queer theory, and mainstream media. Discussions about pegging often deal with gender roles, power dynamics, sexual stigma, and masculinity.

== Terminology ==
The neologism "pegging" was popularized by being the winning entry in a contest for the "Savage Love" sex advice column, held by Dan Savage in 2001. This was due to Savage observing that, after the act was popularized by the sex education movie Bend Over Boyfriend released in 1998, the concept lacked a common name, except for the phrase "Strap On Sex" used by Queen and her partner Robert in their national lecture series (Robert was the original Bend Over Boyfriend at the Good Vibrations lectures), and there was no dictionary entry for the act. Other words include "buggery" or "sodomy", but these refer to anal sex in general. "Strap-on sex" can be used for vaginal or anal intercourse between people of any gender using a strap-on, and is thus less precise than pegging. Some queer people prefer "strap-on sex" instead of "pegging" because they feel the latter is too heterosexual- and cisgender-centric.

Authors Cooper S. Beckett and Lyndzi Miller use "pegger" and "peggee" to refer to the person penetrating and the person being penetrated; "top" and "bottom" are also used. According to Savage, while the classic definition involves a man being penetrated by a woman, the definition has expanded to include all genders and sexualities, as long as it involves anal sex with a strap-on.

== Practice ==
Pegging is penetrative sex with a strap-on dildo, usually anal penetration. It is usually defined as a practice in which a woman penetrates the anus of a man. The woman uses a strap-on dildo, often a silicone phallus, attached with a harness, or a strapless dildo (that also penetrates the pegger). Lubricant is also used.

According to Tristan Taormino, gender and gender roles can play an important part in pegging. Pegging reverses traditional cisgender heterosexual gender roles in sexual practices: the man is penetrated by the woman, becoming passive rather than active. Sex researcher D. J. Williams states that, for many, pegging reflects BDSM themes of dominance and submission. Before engaging in pegging for the first time, the receiving partner typically undergoes anal training to gradually increase muscular relaxation, often using butt plugs. Pegging is a common kink within BDSM. In professional contexts, it is generally performed by dominatrices. Practitioners of feminization kink may incorporate pegging into roleplay to reinforce a feminine sexual role. Pegging is also practiced in the context of female-led relationships (FLR).

According to Ian Kerner, the appeal of pegging is primarily psychological rather than physical. For men, it involves the "psychological thrill" of submitting to the "strength of a woman", subverting gender roles and power dynamics. However, Kerner maintains that pegging is not for everyone. Joe Kort notes that the penetrator may also feel some sensation through indirect clitoral stimulation as the base of the dildo presses against the pubic mound. Individuals aroused by the concept of strap-on sex may also derive enjoyment from performing a strap-on fellatio. Sophie Saint Thomas, writing for Allure, states that getting pegged by a "pro-domme or dominant partner" allows cishet men to "become vulnerable and submissive, which is a common sexual desire", and in a patriarchal society, "submitting to a woman or other person of a marginalized gender gets them off".

== Views and interpretations ==
=== Feminist and queer perspectives ===
In 1999, while criticizing sodomy laws, Debbie Nathan referenced the success of Bend Over Boyfriend, writing that "it's fun to imagine the sex police busting in on a PTA mom while she's reaming the man of the house with her strap-on. When that happens, the rest of the sodomy laws surely will fall."

Evaluating queer opinions on "queering straightness", feminist author Jane Ward notes that "some have hypothesized that gender-subversive sex acts themselves, like pegging, could be a backdoor route to undermining men's patriarchal authority by redefining hetero-masculinity as receptive and vulnerable". Based on feminist and queer theories, Jonathan Branfman and Susan Stiritz argue in the American Journal of Sexuality Education that men's anal receptivity disrupts rigid norms of sex, gender, and sexuality, which they believe to be "social constructs". In their feminist pornography discourse, challenging Robert Jensen's criticism of pornography for its perceived eroticization of male domination, Nora Winter and Morgaine Struve note that Jensen overlooks "porn that reverses power dynamics, such as pegging, which can help dismantle patriarchy".

Queer-feminist Tristan Taormino attributes the acceptance of pegging to the queer community's influence in deconstructing gender boundaries.

There are varying views among feminists on the use of strap-ons in sex. Some feminists argue that strap-on sex imitates patriarchal structures and undermines feminist ideals, asserting that fantasies should align with ethical principles. They criticize feminists who engage in strap-on sex as hypocritical. However, others share these concerns but question whether politics should be brought into the bedroom, while some oppose the notion that strap-on sex is inherently tied to patriarchy. Sex columnist Karley Sciortino shares that, in discourse with female friends who enjoy pegging, she found that they separate politics from sex, even if it deviates from feminism or tends toward patriarchy. One friend described the experience as "fun and powerful", ironically calling it "Freudian bullshit". Another sees it as a "therapeutic tool" for empowerment. Though Sciortino holds opposing views, she concludes that if the aim of sex is intimacy and pleasure, perhaps politics should be set aside.

=== Advocacy ===
In 2016, Tom Ford stated that "all men should be penetrated at some point", as he believes it would help them "understand and appreciate" women by experiencing the "invasion" involved in being in a "vulnerable" and "passive" position. Similarly, Kate Lister has expressed that "all men should be penetrated at least once", suggesting that it could "challenge toxic masculinity and heteronormativity" and ultimately "make the world a better place". Tristan Taormino, describing pegging as "revolutionary" and a form of "sexual liberation", maintains that all straight men "must try it at least once". Erika Lust likewise emphasized that "every girl" and "every man" should "get to enjoy" pegging without "feeling bad". Supporting the practice, Justin Myers remarked that pegging can help deconstruct the "male ego". According to Jessica Drake, "everyone should try it once".

=== Cultural trends and changing attitudes ===
In 2016, Chauntelle Tibbals noted that the "increasing acceptance" of pegging is a logical outcome of "an explosion in public gender awareness, understanding, and willingness to explore boundaries" over the past decade. In 2018, Eric Anderson predicted that the popularity of pegging would rise, noting that "despite what the term 'toxic masculinity' implies, men are becoming softer", which links to "decreasing homophobia and homohysteria". Reflecting on generational changes, Justin Lehmiller observed that the growing references to pegging in popular culture "reflects a deeper societal change", adding that the "decoupling of anal sex and homosexuality is, in some ways, a symptom of a broader decline in sexual conservatism".

Ally Head of Marie Claire wrote that pegging "can be incredibly freeing. It can turn sexual stereotypes upside down and expose you to new perspectives, with surprisingly pleasurable and progressive consequences". In 2019, Playboy writer Maria Del Russo suggested that men willing to be pegged signal masculinity "healing from its toxicity", describing it as a "mark of progress" and "the future that liberals want".

=== Masculinity and psychological aspects ===
Hugo Schwyzer argues that the "fear" of penetration derives from a "deeply misogynistic culture," suggesting that pegging can help straight men become "more thoughtful boyfriends" and better feminist allies. Charlie Glickman and Aislinn Emirzian contend that "men who get into anal penetration are among the most secure in their masculinity". Olivia Cassano of Metro endorses pegging, noting that it inverts the "traditional framework of gender and sexual roles" and can help men "get over insecurities". She criticizes the perception of pegging as gay or "unmanly", attributing it to a "patriarchal idea of emasculation", an "ew" factor, and "internalized homophobia". Georgia Aspinall of Grazia suggests that asking a man if he is into pegging can indicate whether he is "boyfriend material", revealing how "secure he is in his sexuality" and his attitude toward "women who loudly proclaim their sexual agency without shame". Psychotherapist Jordan Dixon notes that some men feel shame after pegging, shaped by sex-negativity and gender norms, which reemerge after the "highs of oxytocin and dopamine" diminish.

Nadia Bokody believes pegging could redefine masculinity by easing its "toxic" and "oppressive restraints", yet men with "homophobic" views avoid it, revealing a "fragile construct of masculinity" rooted in "fear of vulnerability and femininity". Leeza Mangaldas notes that pegging remains taboo for cishet men, "largely because of society's overarching homophobia and misogyny", and adds that shame and disgust toward the act arise from "unexamined prejudices." According to Eleanor Hadley, many women hesitate to explore pegging because of "misogynistic rhetoric" that shames them. According to sex therapist Laura Miano, pegging contradicts "hegemonic masculinity" and sexual stereotypes. The practice can allow cisgender women to "feel a sense of empowerment," while men may enjoy "relinquishing control".

== In culture ==
According to Beckett and Miller (2022), most popular representations of pegging are derogatory, negative or even amount to sexual assault.

Marquis de Sade describes a pegging act in his 1795 book Philosophy in the Bedroom. There is a depiction of pegging in the William S. Burroughs 1959 novel Naked Lunch. The dildo used is called Steely Dan III, and is the source from which the musical group Steely Dan takes its name. The 1970 film Myra Breckinridge depicted a pegging scene where Myra rapes a man with a strap-on dildo. The first explicit pegging scene is believed to be the 1976 pornographic film The Opening of Misty Beethoven. Bend Over Boyfriend (1998) is based on lectures and workshops by Robert Lawrence and Carol Queen. Bend Over Boyfriend inspired Dan Savage to call the act "BOBing" but his readers subsequently voted on the winning term "pegging" in a 2001 contest and the term has since entered the English lexicon.

Since the coinage of "pegging", it was featured in the TV show Weeds, on the episode "Crush Girl Love Panic" (2006). Here, pegging appears to be non-consensual and is played as a joke towards the male character being forced into anal sex. In the Broad City episode "Knockoffs", an uncertain Abbi seeks advice from friends and family about pegging Jeremy. Abbi Jacobson later described it as "the best episode we've ever done". In the 2016 film Deadpool, Wade is pegged by his girlfriend Vanessa to celebrate International Women's Day. Marie Claire's Ally Head cited the scene in describing Wade as a "progressive male". In François Ozon's 2017 film Double Lover, Chloé pegs Paul. Ozon stated that this scene "aligns with the feminist film that I advocate for". IndieWire's Jude Dry noted that it establishes Paul as a "more evolved man".

The season two, episode six (2019) of Vida opens with a sex scene in which Lyn (Melissa Barrera) pegs councilman Rudy. In the episode "To Peg Or Not To Peg" (2020) of the TV series The Bold Type, Kat pegs Cody to challenge preconceived gender roles. At the Met Gala 2021, Cara Delevingne wore a vest printed with the slogan "Peg the Patriarchy", garnering media attention. She said: "It's about women empowerment, gender equality—it's a bit like, 'stick it to the man'". In episode seven (2025) of The Hunting Wives, Callie pegs her husband, Sheriff Jonny. The scene, which sparked reactions on TikTok, is noted by Decider as exposing the couple's "conservative Christian values" as a "façade".

== Bibliography ==
- Beckett, Cooper S.; Miller, Lyndzi (14 October 2022). The Pegging Book: A Complete Guide to Anal Sex with a Strap-On Dildo. Thorntree Press LLC. ISBN 978-1-952125-22-5.
