= Carol Queen =

American author, editor, and sexologist

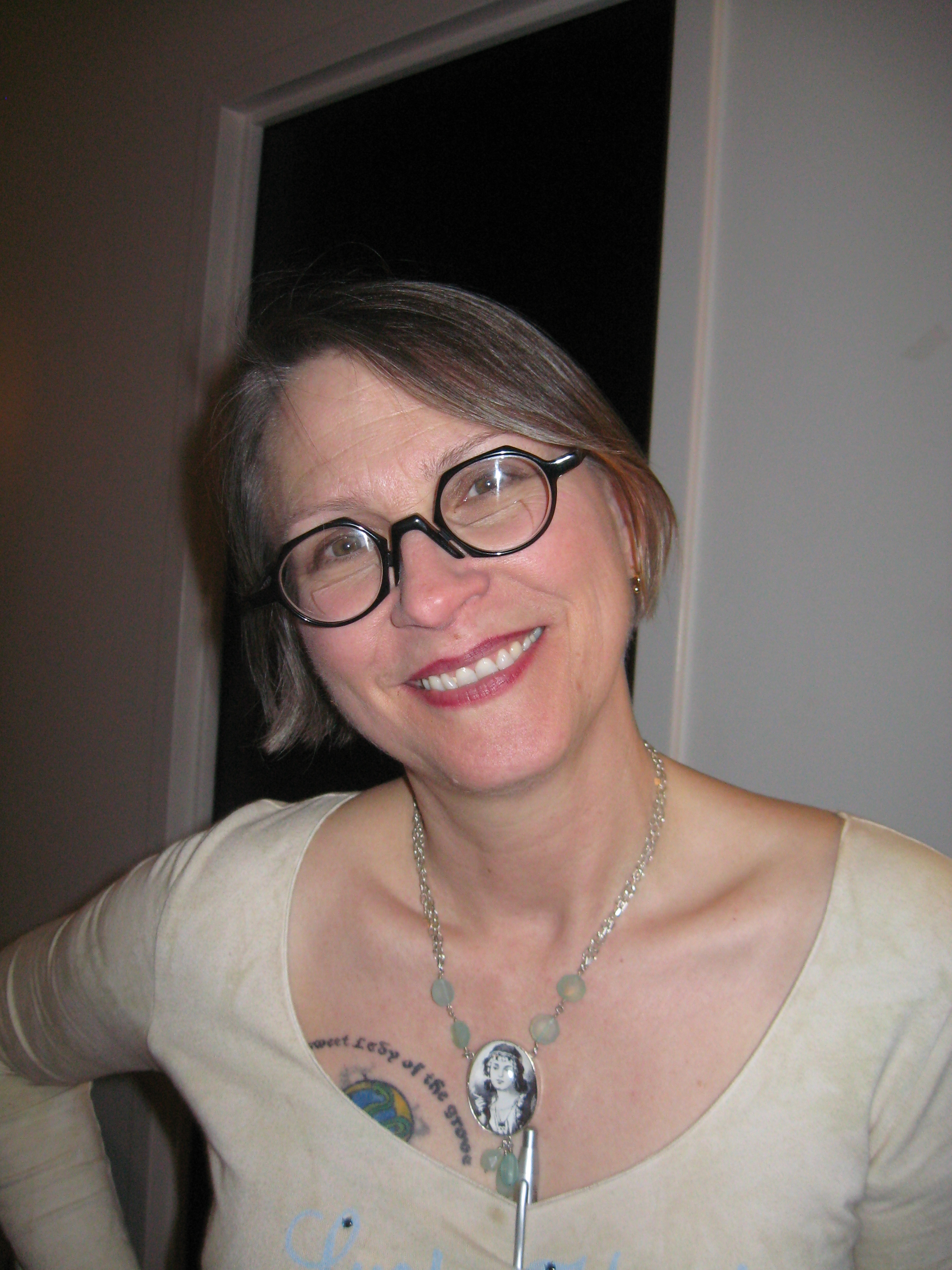
- Queen, 2010
- Born: 1957 (age 68–69)
- Education: University of Oregon
- Occupations: Author; editor; sexologist; adult filmmaker; curator
- Employer: Good Vibrations
- Website: carolqueen.com

Carol Queen (born 1957) is an American feminist author, editor, and sexologist active in the sex-positive feminism movement. Queen is a two time Grand Marshal of San Francisco LGBTQ Pride, and founded the Center for Sex & Culture. Queen has written on human sexuality in books such as Real Live Nude Girl: Chronicles of Sex-Positive Culture. She has written a sex tutorial, Exhibitionism for the Shy: Show Off, Dress Up and Talk Hot, as well as erotica, such as the novel The Leather Daddy and the Femme. Queen has produced adult movies, events, workshops and lectures. Queen was featured as an instructor and star in both installments of the Bend Over Boyfriend series about female-to-male anal sex, or pegging. She has also served as editor for compilations and anthologies. She is a sex-positive sex educator in the United States.

== Good Vibrations ==
Queen serves as staff sexologist to Good Vibrations, a San Francisco sex toy retailer. In this function, she designed an education program which has trained many other current and past Good Vibrations-based sex educators, including Violet Blue, Charlie Glickman, and Staci Haines. She is currently still working for GV as The Staff Sexologist, Chief Cultural Officer, curator, and historian.

== Writing ==
Queen is known as a professional editor, writer, and commentator of works such as Real Live Nude Girl: Chronicles of Sex-Positive Culture, Pomosexuals, and Exhibitionism for the Shy. She has written for juried journals and compendiums such as The Journal of Bisexuality and The International Encyclopedia of Human Sexuality. She contributed the piece "The Queer in Me" to the anthology Bi Any Other Name: Bisexual People Speak Out.

== Absexual ==
The neologism absexual has also been introduced by Queen, although it was coined by her partner. Based on its prefix ab- (as in "abhor" or in "abreaction"), it represents a form of sexuality where someone is stimulated by moving away from sexuality or is moralistically opposed to sex. Betty Dodson defined the term as describing "folks who get off complaining about sex and trying to censor porn." As of 2010 absexuality is not an official psychiatric term. Queen proposed inclusion of the concept in the American Psychiatric Association's DSM-5. Darrell Hamamoto sees Queen's view of absexuality as playfully broad: "the current 'absexuality' embraced by many progressive and conservative critics of pornographic literature is itself a kind of 'kink' stemming from a compulsive need to impose their own sexual mores upon those whom they self-righteously condemn as benighted reprobates."

== Development of SHARP ==
In 2000, Queen together with her partner Robert Morgan Lawrence published a jointly written essay in the Journal of Bisexuality detailing the role of San Francisco bisexuals in the development of safe sex strategies in response to the emerging AIDS crisis in the 1980s. Queen detailed her and Lawrence's development of a safe sex version of the SAR or Sexual Attitude Reassessment training, which they termed Sexual Health Attitude Restructuring Process or SHARP. Originally a program started by the IASHS, SHARP is described as a combination of "lectures, films, videos, slides, and personal sharing", as well as "massage techniques, condom relay races, a blindfolded ritual known as the Sensorium which emphasized transformation and sensate focus, and much more." In 2007, Queen expressed the intention to revive the SHARP training, now referred to as SARP or Sexual Attitude Reassessment Process.'

== Personal life ==
Queen is bisexual. Her long-term partner is Robert Morgan Lawrence, with whom she has an open relationship. Queen is a Wiccan.

== Awards ==
PoMoSexuals: Challenging Assumptions about Gender and Sexuality won the 1998 Lambda Literary Award for Transgender Literature and was a finalist for Lambda's Anthologies/Nonfiction category.

The Leather Daddy and the Femme won the 1999 Firecracker Alternative Book Award for Fiction.

Best Bisexual Erotica, Volume 2 was a finalist for the 2002 Lambda Literary Award for Transgender/Bisexual Literature.

== Works ==
=== Author ===
- The Sex & Pleasure Book: Good Vibrations Guide to Great Sex for Everyone , with Shar Rednour (Good Vibrations, 2015) ISBN 0986150436
- Real Live Nude Girl: Chronicles of Sex-Positive Culture (Cleis Press, 1997) ISBN 1-57344-073-6 - reissued 2002 with new introduction and updated Recommended Reading list.
- Exhibitionism for the Shy: Show Off, Dress Up and Talk Hot (Down There Press, 1995; Quality Paperback Book Club Edition, 1997) ISBN 0-940208-16-4 - excerpted in the German book Dirty Talking (Schwarzkopf und Schwarzkopf, 2002); also translated into Chinese (Hsin-Lin Books, 2003)
- The Leather Daddy and the Femme (Cleis Press, 1998) ISBN 0-940208-31-8

=== Editor ===
- More 5 Minute Erotica, (Running Press, 2007)
- Whipped: 20 Erotic Stories of Female Dominance (Chamberlain Bros., 2005) ISBN 1-59609-046-4
- Best Bisexual Erotica (Best of Series Vol. 1), with Bill Brent (Circlet Press, 2003) ISBN 1-885865-47-3
- 5 Minute Erotica (Running Press, 2003) ISBN 0-7624-1560-6
- Speaking Parts: Provocative Lesbian Erotica, with M. Christian (Alyson Books, 2002) ISBN 1-55583-700-X
- Best Bisexual Erotica Vol. 2, with Bill Brent (Circlet/Black Books, 2001) ISBN 1-892723-10-7
- Best Bisexual Erotica, with Bill Brent (Circlet/Black Books, 2000) ISBN 0-7394-1209-4
- Sex Spoken Here: Stories from the Good Vibrations Erotic Reading Circle, with Jack R. Davis (Down There Press, 1998) ISBN 0-940208-19-9
- PoMoSexuals: Challenging Assumptions About Gender and Sexuality, with Lawrence Schimel (Cleis Press, 1997) ISBN 1-57344-074-4
- Switch Hitters: Lesbians Write Gay Male Erotica and Gay Men Write Lesbian Erotica, with Lawrence Schimel (Cleis Press, 1996) ISBN 1-57344-021-3 [partially reprinted with new material in German under the title Sexperimente (Querverlag, 1999)]

=== Film ===
- Carol Queen's Great Vibrations: An Explicit Guide to Vibrators, Blank Tapes, ~1997.

== See also ==
- LGBT culture in San Francisco
