= Sexual Attitude Reassessment =

A Sexual Attitude Reassessment, sometimes Sexual Attitude Restructuring (SAR), seminar is a process-oriented, structured group experience to promote participants' awareness of their attitudes and values related to sexuality, and to assist them in understanding how these attitudes and values affect them professionally and personally. Since the primary purpose of a SAR is the examination of attitudes and values, it is not a traditional academic experience designed to disseminate cognitive information, nor is it psychotherapy directed toward the resolution of personal problems.

A SAR provides an opportunity for participants to explore and understand their beliefs, attitudes, values and biases within the realm of sex and sexuality. This self-exploration and self-understanding facilitates comfort that ultimately fosters improved communication skills, both on a professional and a personal level.

By becoming increasingly aware of their perceptions, beliefs, and feelings, participants become increasingly comfortable with the wide variation of existing sexual attitudes, behaviours, practices, and even sub-cultures. This comfort is necessary for sexual health professionals, and is also beneficial for individuals striving for personal growth and the development of healthy personal relationships.

During a SAR, participants examine sexuality and sexual attitudes from numerous perspectives using a variety of images. The nature of a SAR requires that some of the media be explicit. The use of explicit media is necessary for increasing self-awareness and personal comfort with the many areas of sex and sexuality. In addition to the personal growth, the event involves small group discussions during which participants are challenged with the opportunity to practice their professional or interpersonal skills.

== See also ==
- Homophobia
- Sexism
