= Charlie Glickman =

American sex coach

- Born: Charles J. Glickman; United States
- Occupations: Sex educator; relationship coach; author
- Notable work: The Ultimate Guide to Prostate Pleasure: Erotic Exploration for Men and Their Partners
- Website: makesexeasy.com

Charlie Glickman (born Charles J. Glickman) is an American sex educator, coach, and author. His work focuses on topics including shame, sex positivity, queer issues, masculinity, relationships, and erotic communities. Glickman is the co-author of The Ultimate Guide to Prostate Pleasure: Erotic Exploration for Men and Their Partners, a book that explores male anal eroticism and prostate pleasure.

== Early life ==
During his time in college, Glickman came out as bisexual and engaged in outreach programs to educate fellow students, fostering an open dialogue around sexuality and safe sex. These experiences allowed him to discover the concept of sex positivity. He graduated in 1992.

Glickman received PhD in Adult Sexuality Education from the Union Institute & University. His thesis Sex and Shame: Authenticity in Adult Education was published on Electronic Journal of Human Sexuality. Glickman is a member of the American Association of Sexuality Educators, Counselors and Therapists. He is certified in sexological bodywork from the Association of Certified Sexological Bodyworkers and somatic sex education from Somatica Institute.

== Career ==
Glickman is a San Francisco-based sex educator. He is specializing in topics such as shame in sex, sex positivity, queer issues, masculinity in gender studies, relationships, and erotic communities. He has extensive experience as a teacher, blogger, writer, and occasional university professor. According to Glickman, he began studying about shame based on his own experiences as he himself suffered from that emotion for a large part of his life. He also conducts somatic sexual healing workshops.

He joined sex toys retailer Good Vibrations in 1996, where he deepened his understanding of sex positivity. He worked as the Education Program Manager there, where he also served as the editor of Good Vibrations Magazine. He worked at Good Vibrations for over a decade, eventually becoming the company's board member, alongside Carol Queen. After leaving Good Vibrations, Glickman pursued doctoral studies in adult sexual education and continued teaching and training sex educators. He also trained sex educators. An advocate for sex positivity, he opposes the prohibition of prostitution.

In 2011, he wrote a blog titled How Pegging Can Help Save The World, emphasizing the benefits of pegging in bringing changes to the society. It was quoted in articles on pegging by Jezebel (written by Hugo Schwyzer), Refinery29, Mel Magazine, Agents of Ishq. Editor from Vice wrote that the idea of equating pegging to saving the world is "borderline delusional". For comments about pegging, he has been consulted by medias such as Cosmopolitan, GQ, Chicago Tribune, Men's Health, Salon.com, among others.

In 2013, he co-authored the book The Ultimate Guide to Prostate Pleasure: Erotic Exploration for Men and Their Partners along with sex educator Aislinn Emirzian. The book was cited by Jane Ward in her own book The Tragedy of Heterosexuality. He contributed a chapter, The World Will be a Better Place When More Men Take It Up the Ass, in the book Gender, Sex, and Politics: In the Streets and Between the Sheets in the 21st Century (2015). Glickman has developed his own method for practicing consent and expressing desire with a "simple formula" involving the word "if".

== Personal life ==
Glickman identifies as both bisexual and a queer man. In a 2013 article for the San Diego Free Press, he mentioned celebrating his 20th anniversary with his female partner. He resides in Oakland, United States.

== Bibliography ==
- 2013: The Ultimate Guide to Prostate Pleasure: Erotic Exploration for Men and Their Partners - Cleis Press
- 2019: Sex and Shame - Mango Garden Press
