= Strap-on dildo =

Device used for sexual penetration or other sexual activity

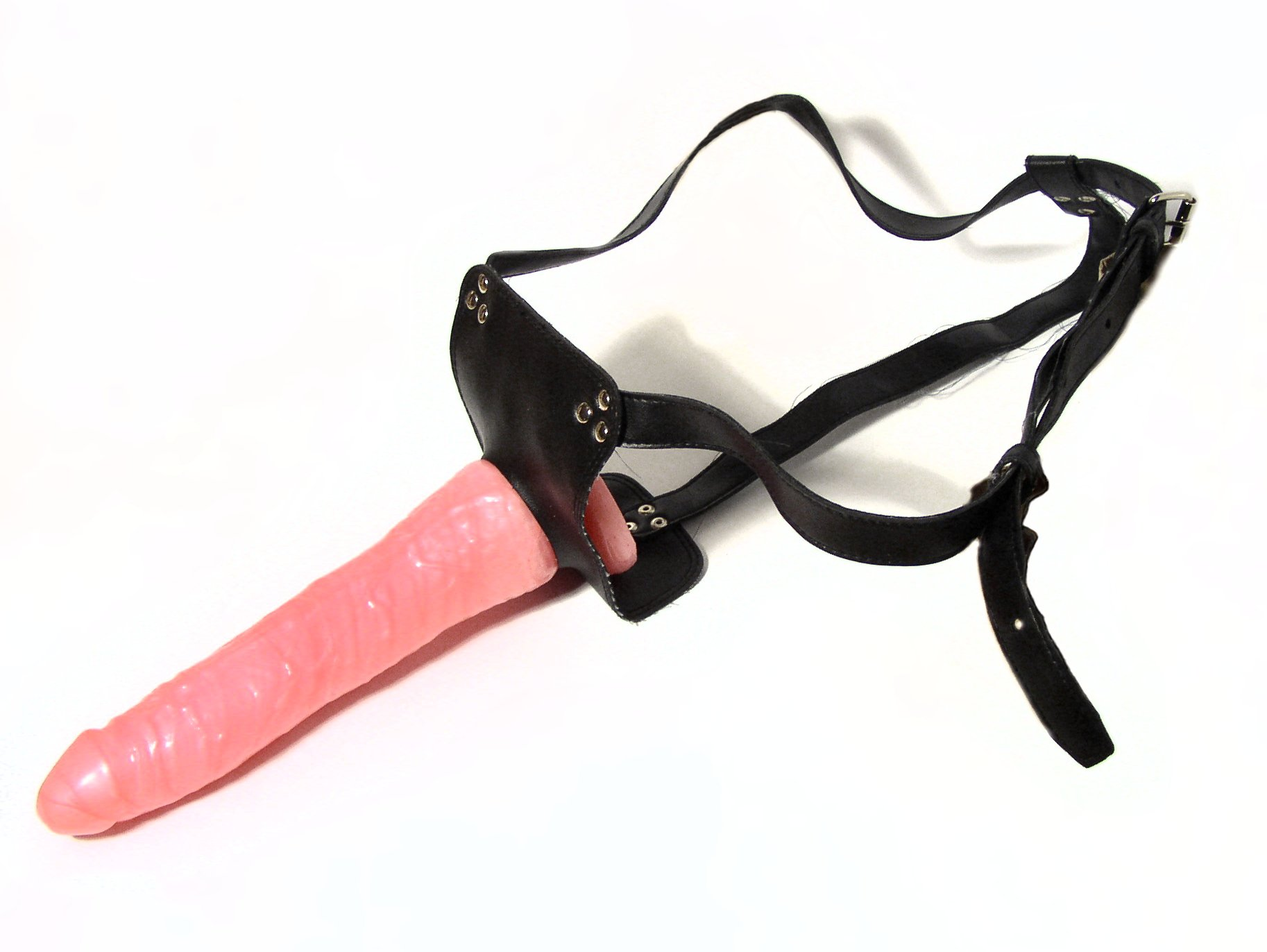
A strap-on dildo

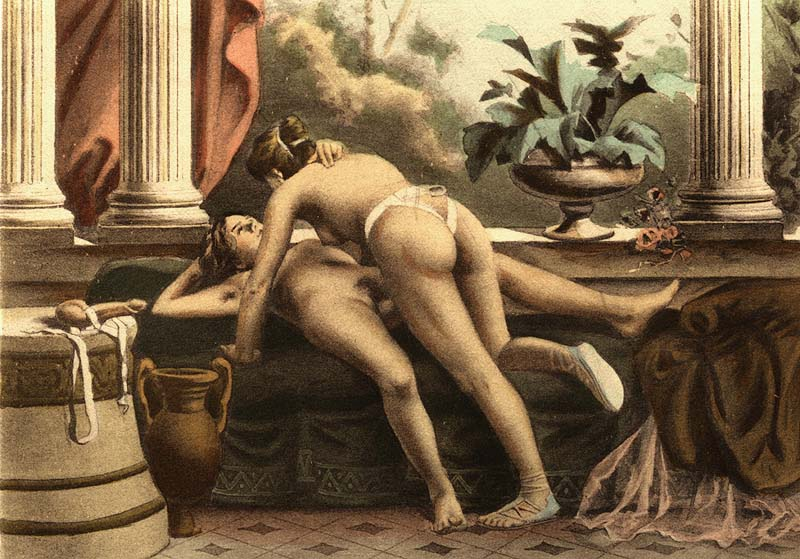
Strap-on dildo being used by two women. Lithograph from De Figuris Veneris (1906) by Édouard-Henri Avril

A strap-on dildo (also simply a strap-on) is a dildo designed to be worn, usually with a harness, during sexual activity. Harnesses and dildos are made in a wide variety of styles, with variations in how the harness fits the wearer, how the dildo attaches to the harness, as well as various features intended to facilitate stimulation of the wearer or a sexual partner. Strap-on dildos can be used by people of any gender or sexuality.

A strap-on dildo can be used for a wide variety of sexual activities, including vaginal sex, anal sex, pegging, oral sex, or masturbation. Sexual lubricant can be used to ease insertion.

== Equipment ==
Many types of equipment are available, with different features and drawbacks, for a strap-on dildo set up. Often the strap-on dildo will be used with a harness, but some do not need a harness or are built onto one; for these, please see the sections on dildo types and attachment methods.

=== Harness types ===
The first part of a strap-on setup is the harness, which connects the dildo to the wearer's body, usually in a position similar to that of a male's genitals. A good harness should be sturdy yet comfortable, and is often designed to provide stimulation for the wearer.

==== Two-strap ====
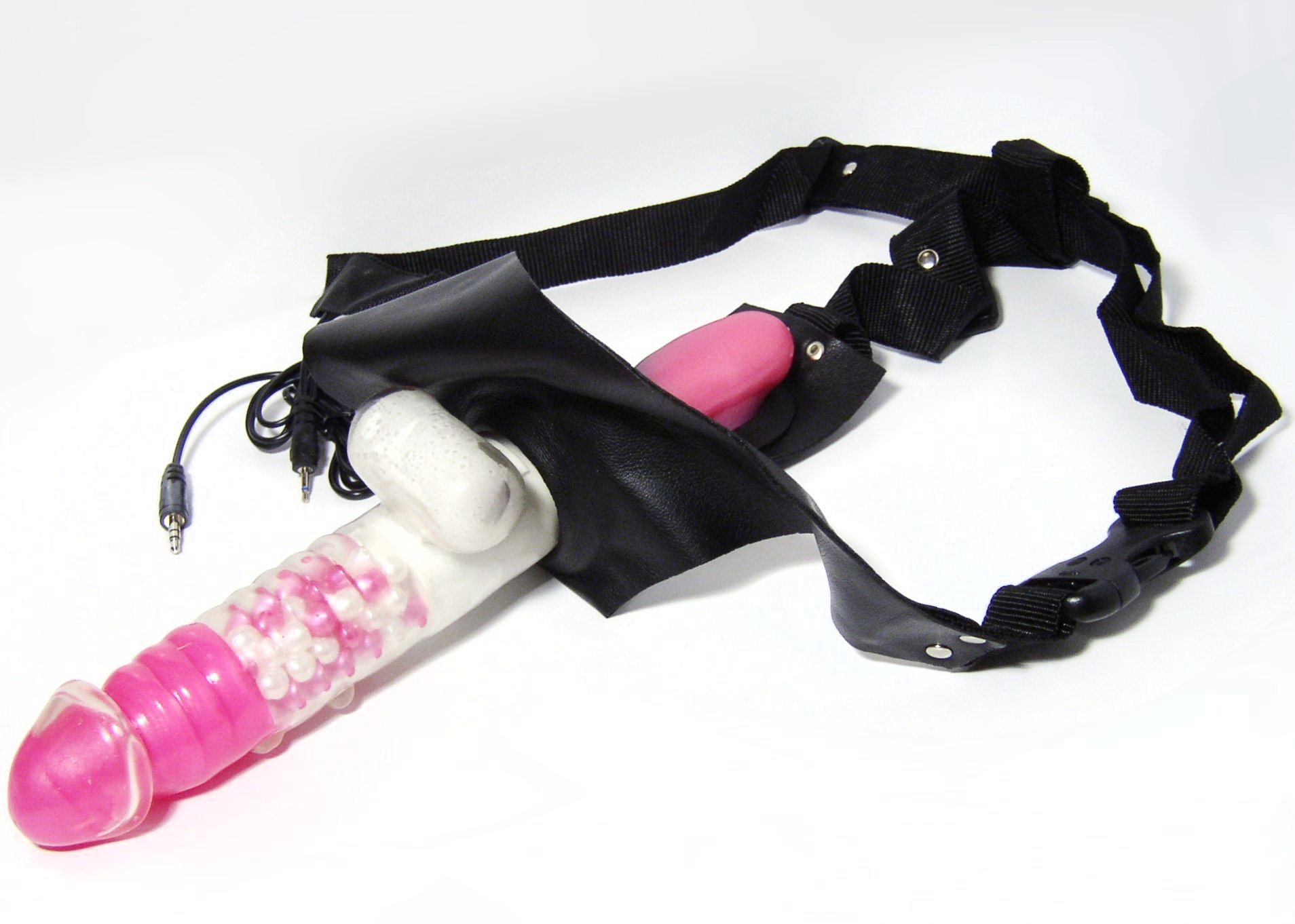
A 2-strap harness with a multi-function dildo with bullet vibrator and vibrating egg for internal use

A two-strap harness, in its most basic form, is similar to a G-string. One strap goes around the wearer's waist, like a belt, while the other goes between the wearer's legs and connects to the other strap in the middle at the lower back.

==== Three-strap ====
Three-strap harnesses have one strap around the wearer's waist, but instead of one strap between the legs, they have two straps, one around each thigh, rejoining the first strap near the front. This design leaves the genitals and anus uncovered, and attaches the dildo more firmly, giving the wearer more control. Not all people find this design comfortable, and sometimes they are difficult to fit properly, and tend to slip.

==== Leather ====
Leather is comfortable and adjusts to the wearer's body, but still is strong. Leather is harder to clean and requires more work to maintain than other materials.

==== Cloth ====
Cloth is used mostly for clothing harnesses such as corsets and other lingerie, although is occasionally used by extremely inexpensive harnesses.

==== Plastic ====
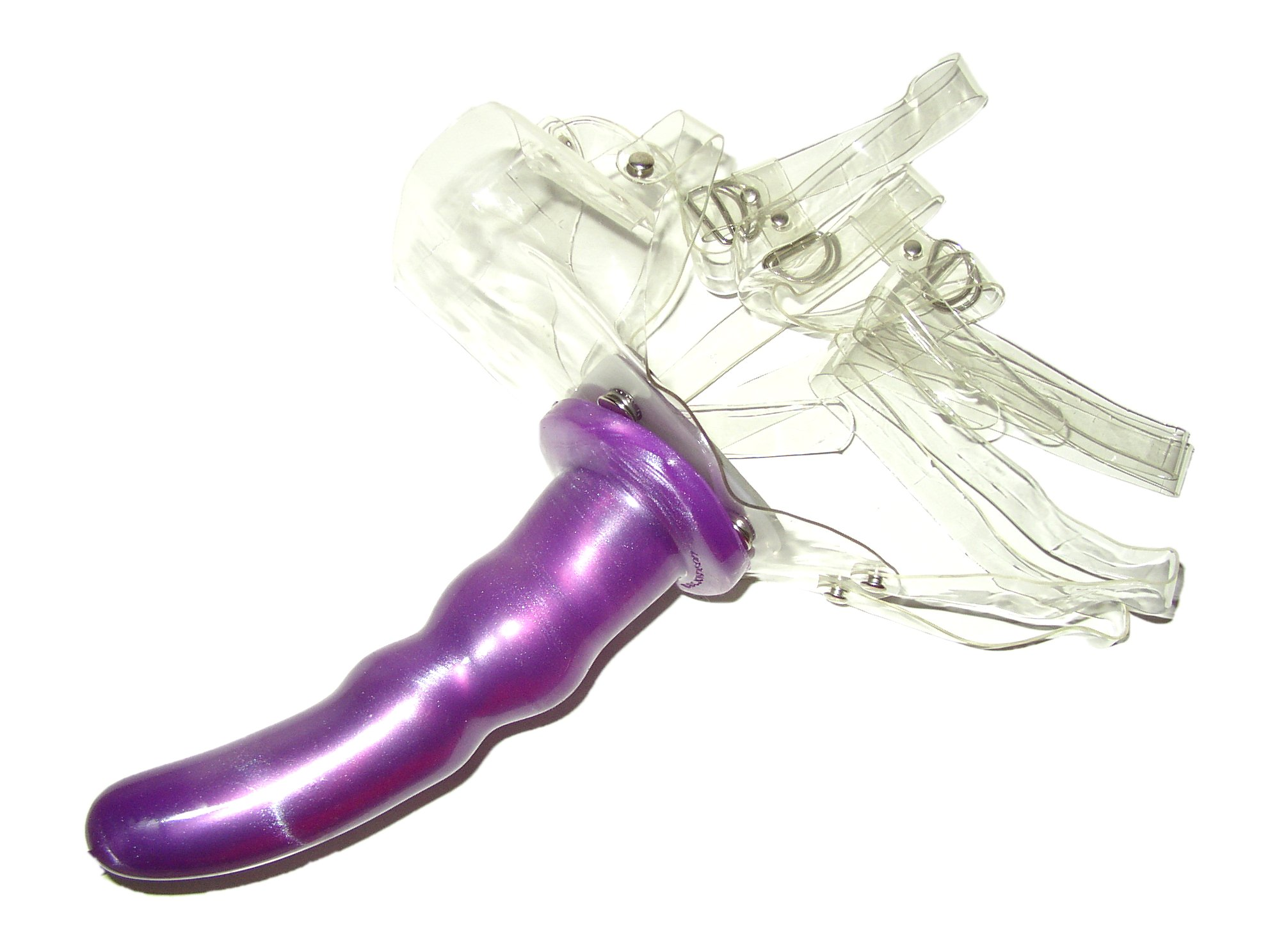
Clear plastic harness

Some harnesses are made with soft plastic, such as flexible vinyl. These are often available in colors besides traditional black, and may be completely transparent (not possible with other materials). They may be less comfortable than other materials, and may be difficult to make fit well. They are very easy to clean and fairly robust.

==== Latex, rubber and PVC ====
Latex harnesses usually cover the entire area, rather than just using straps. They tend to be medium-priced, and have a limited lifespan, especially if used with oil-based lubricants. Latex can require much care, such as special cleaners or shiners to keep it from turning dry and dusty. Latex harnesses may or may not have the dildo(s) molded as part of the harness, and in either case, they tend to be floppy due to the flexibility of the latex. Similar harnesses are also available made of rubber or PVC, and are similar to latex harnesses, although PVC tends to be much less flexible and elastic

=== Corsets and other clothing ===
Strap-on harnesses built into various clothing items are available, most often as a corset or other item of lingerie. Some are designed to be worn underneath normal clothing for quick use (if done with the dildo in place, either to give the appearance of a penis or to be able to quickly initiate intercourse, this is sometimes called packing), while others take advantage of the additional strength and sturdiness an item of clothing can provide over a few straps, or just to integrate the strap-on into an erotic outfit.

=== Bases ===
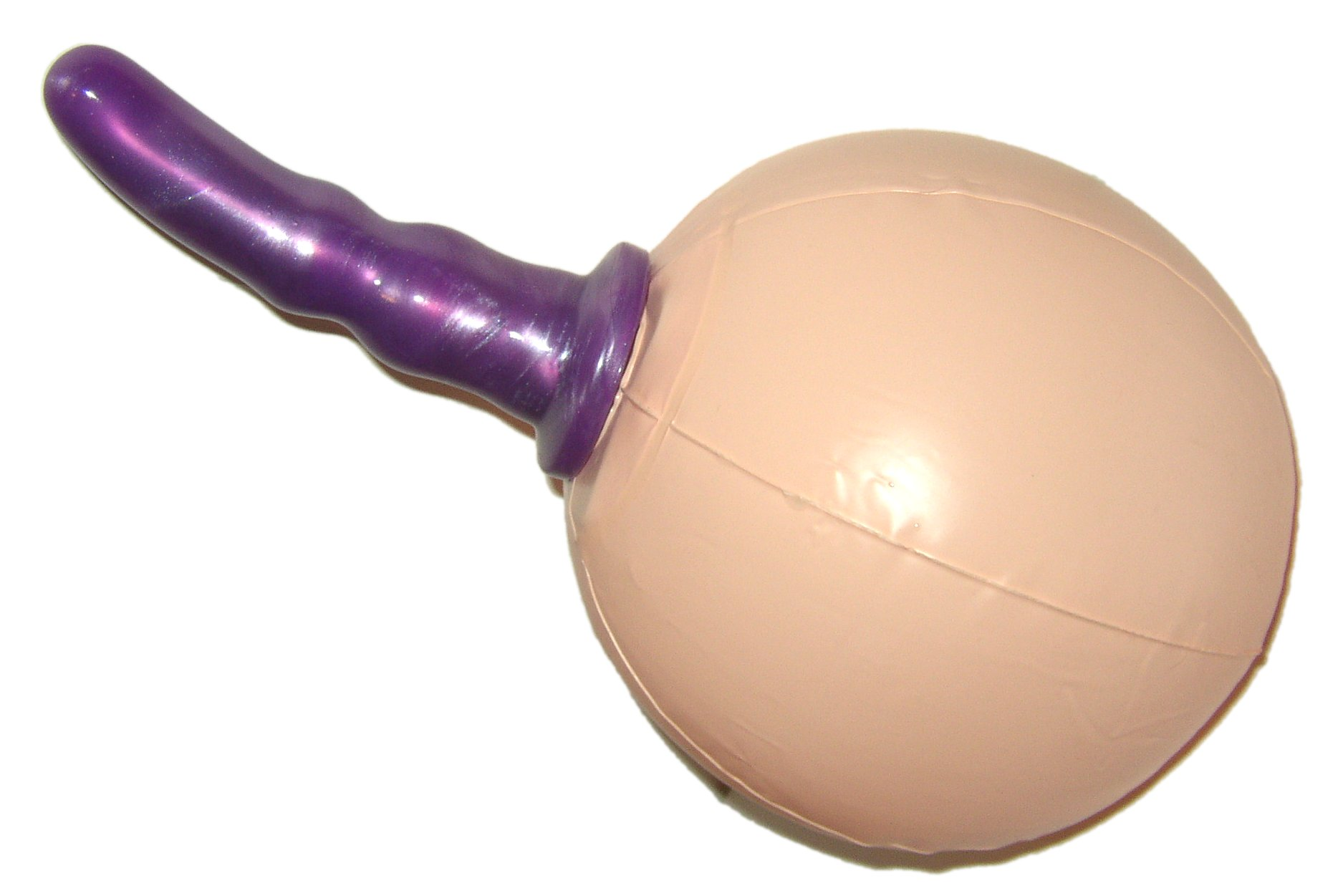
Inflatable ball with Vac-u-lock plug and attached dildo

Fittings are available to attach dildos to just about any household object, allowing for many creative uses. A dildo could be attached to a chair, bed, or any other item of furniture, and penetrate someone during other activities, with or without a partner.

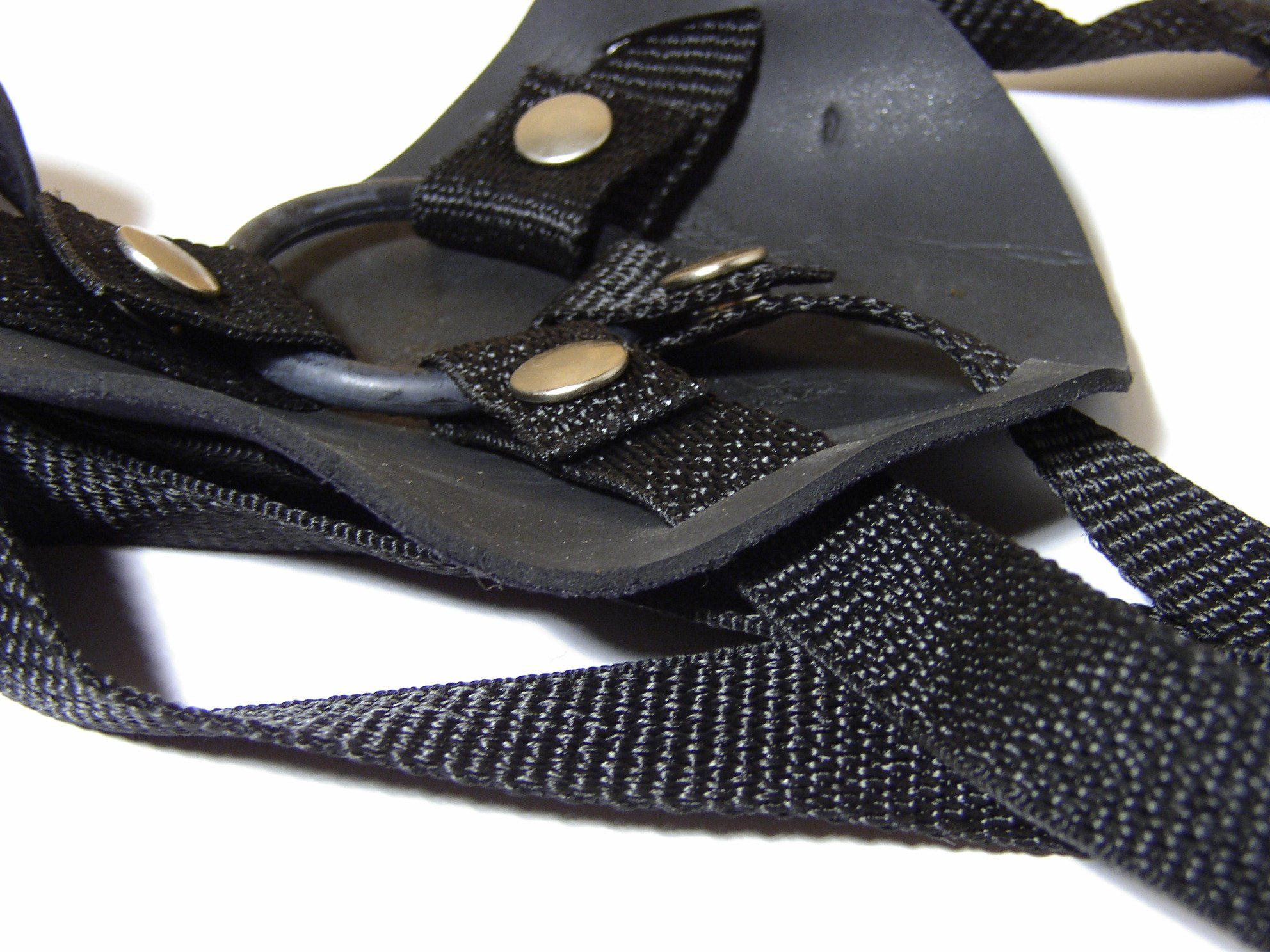
O-ring harness, made with foam and nylon

Nylon webbing and soft foam-like synthetic leather are common, relatively affordable, and very durable. Synthetic harnesses are relatively easy to clean and require relatively little maintenance. Some, such as the Spare Parts harness, are machine-washable.

== Attachment methods ==
The principal feature of any strap-on setup is the attachment of the dildo to the harness. While there is a huge array of different dildos available, most need a specific kind of attachment to a harness, All methods have tradeoffs, and many couples will have different harnesses depending on which type of dildo they intend to use.

=== Ring and wide base ===
The most common means of holding the dildo to the harness is to have an opening or ring in the harness through which a wide-based dildo is inserted. Inexpensive harnesses tend to just have a round hole in the fabric or leather, while more expensive ones will use a steel or rubber ring. The advantage of this method is that dildos which fit are widely available and inexpensive, and even many dildos not meant for harness use will work in one of these harnesses, such as most dildos with testicles. The major disadvantage is the dildo is often held loosely (especially on cheap harnesses) and tends to flop downwards, and the dildo often can rotate in the harness, making it difficult or impossible to use G-spot or other shaped dildos.

=== Vacuum seal ===
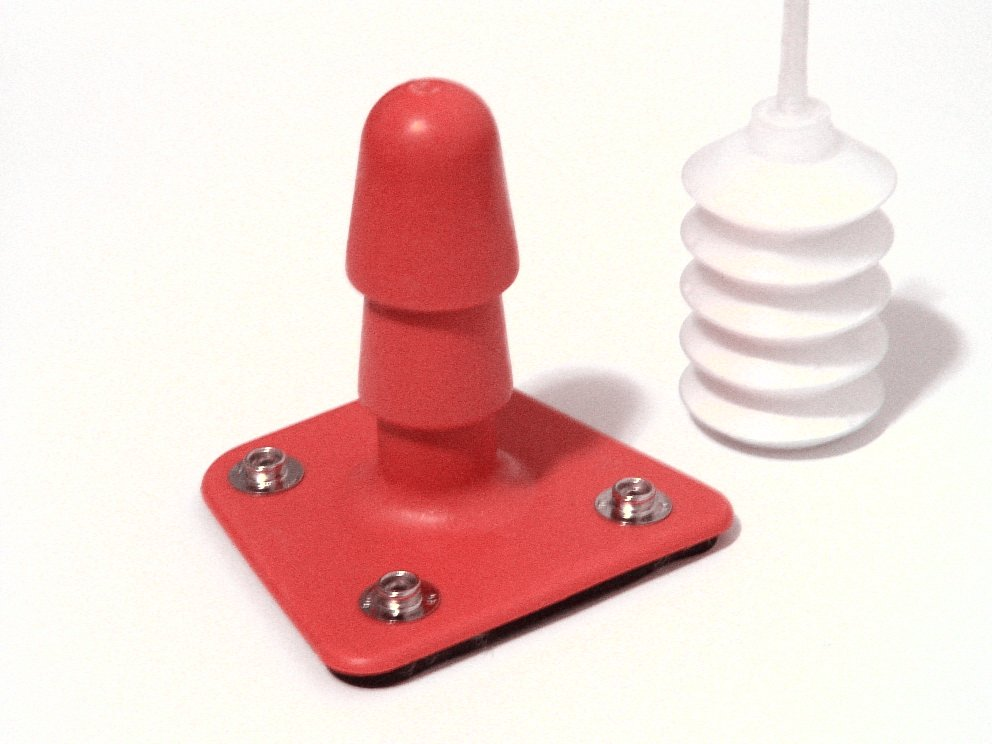
Vac-u-lock plug and powder lubricant

Used primarily by Doc Johnson, Vac-u-lock dildos have a rippled hollow in their base, which fits onto a matching plug on the harness or other toy. Powdered lubricant is used on the plug to facilitate removal. The advantage of this design is the dildo is firmly attached and can not easily rotate, and does not tend to flop downwards or slip like ring harnesses, as well as there being a wide variety of other devices the dildos can be attached to, such as handles and inflatable balls. The disadvantage is the relatively low availability and high cost of compatible attachments. A number of brands have non-compatible clones of the vac-u-lock system, but dildos and accessories for them are virtually unavailable.

=== Strapless ===
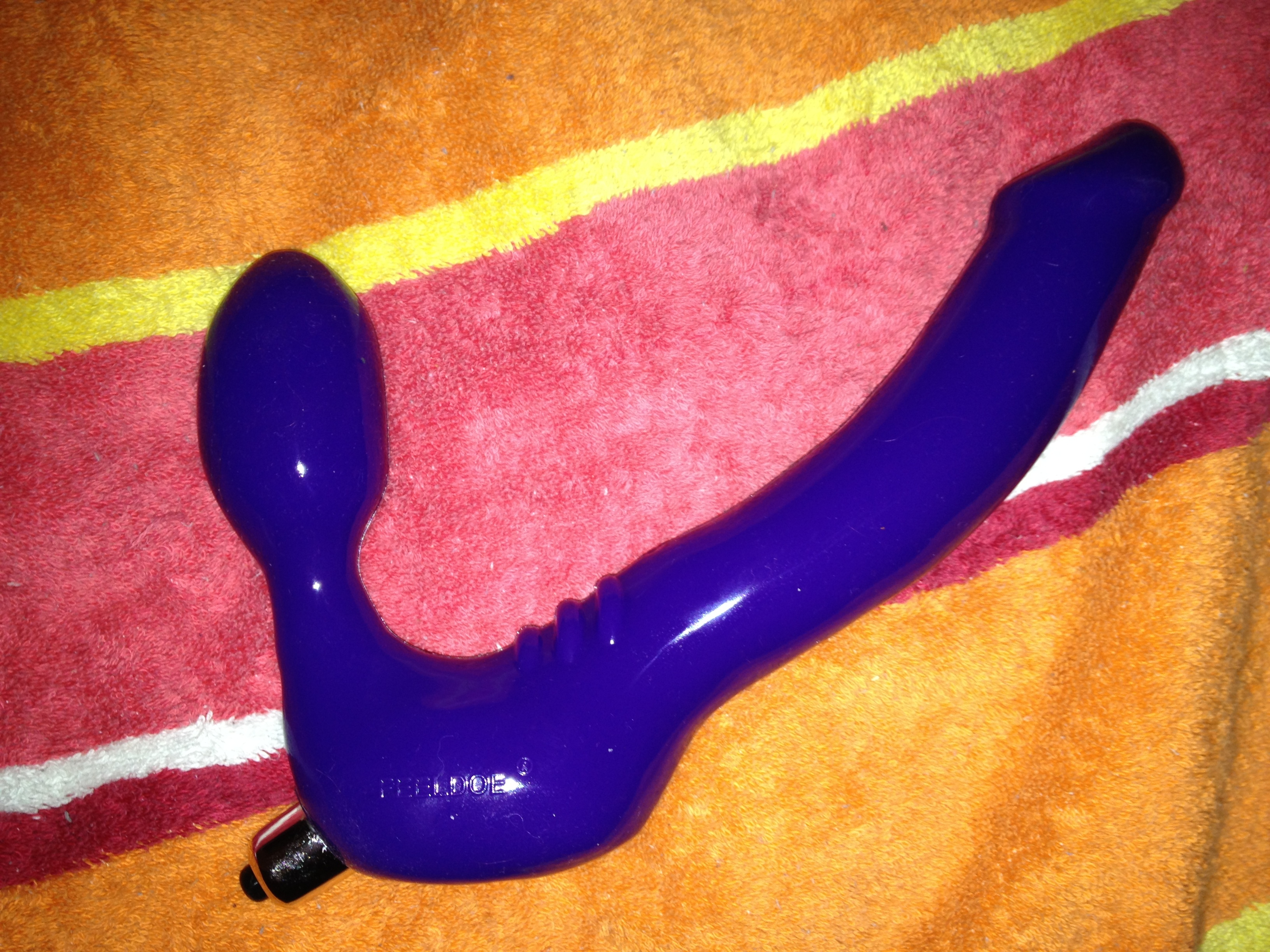
Feeldoe Classic

A recent design is a strapless strap-on, designed to be held in a vagina or anus with an egg-shaped bulb and thus not to require the use of a harness. This differs from a double dildo where both ends are phallic and a harness is required. The Feeldoe is a strapless dildo which was patented by Melissa Mia Kain in 1997. Advantages of this design are that it can be used spontaneously, that it provides deep internal thrusting to both partners, and that the lack of harness makes it more comfortable. Strapless strap-ons may also incorporate adjustable vibration mechanisms to provide different intensity levels, with Lovense among the companies producing such models. Disadvantages are that the eggs do not prevent rotation or droop, leading to a reduced amount of control unless a harness is employed anyway; a requirement for strong muscles; and the practice needed to become familiar with its use. Many strapless strap-ons can also be used with a harness when partners want to increase control. Not all harnesses are suitable for strapless strap-ons. It is highly recommended that you use a strap-on with very adjustable O-ring or a two-hole harness.

=== Double penetration ===
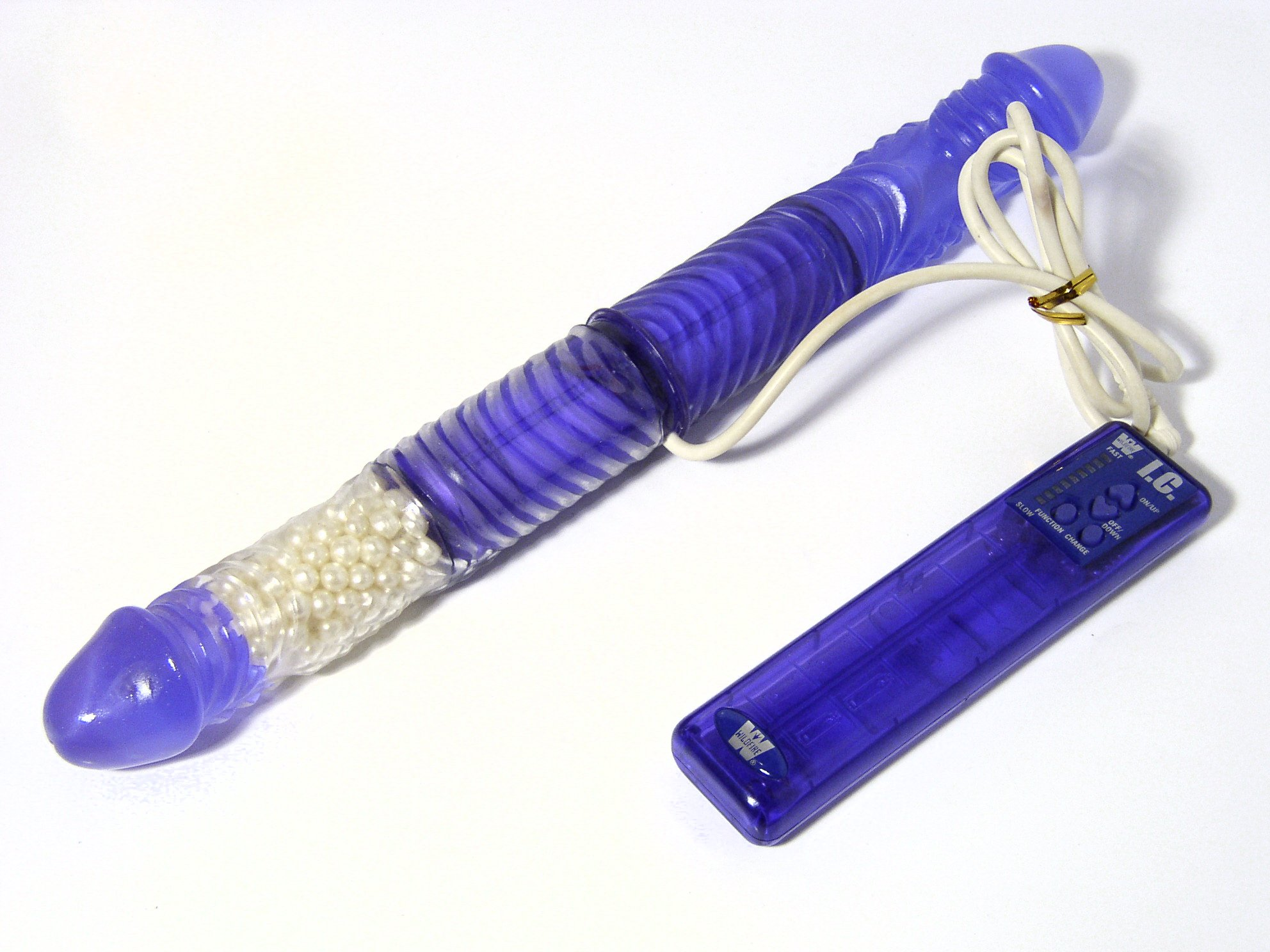
Double dildo with digital controls

A double dildo can be used with or without a harness, although most provide no means of using them with a harness. A double dildo, as its name implies, is a dildo in which both ends are designed for insertion, and often is 18 inches (450 mm) or more long. While special ones meant for use with a harness do exist, a normal double dildo is straight, is rarely at a comfortable angle for intercourse, and jabs into the cervix of a woman using one. Double dildos can be used for a variety of creative positions for which a harness would be awkward, such as both partners in doggy style positions or sitting facing each other.

=== One-piece latex ===
Some harnesses and dildos are made of a single piece of molded latex, with the dildo permanently built into the front. These are often inexpensive, shoddy products, although higher quality ones are available. The advantages are simple use and an appearance some people find erotic, but this is often outweighed by the inability to use a different dildo, the often weak, floppy nature of the dildo, the inability to adjust to a given person for a comfortable fit, and their relatively short lifespan.

=== Molded straps ===
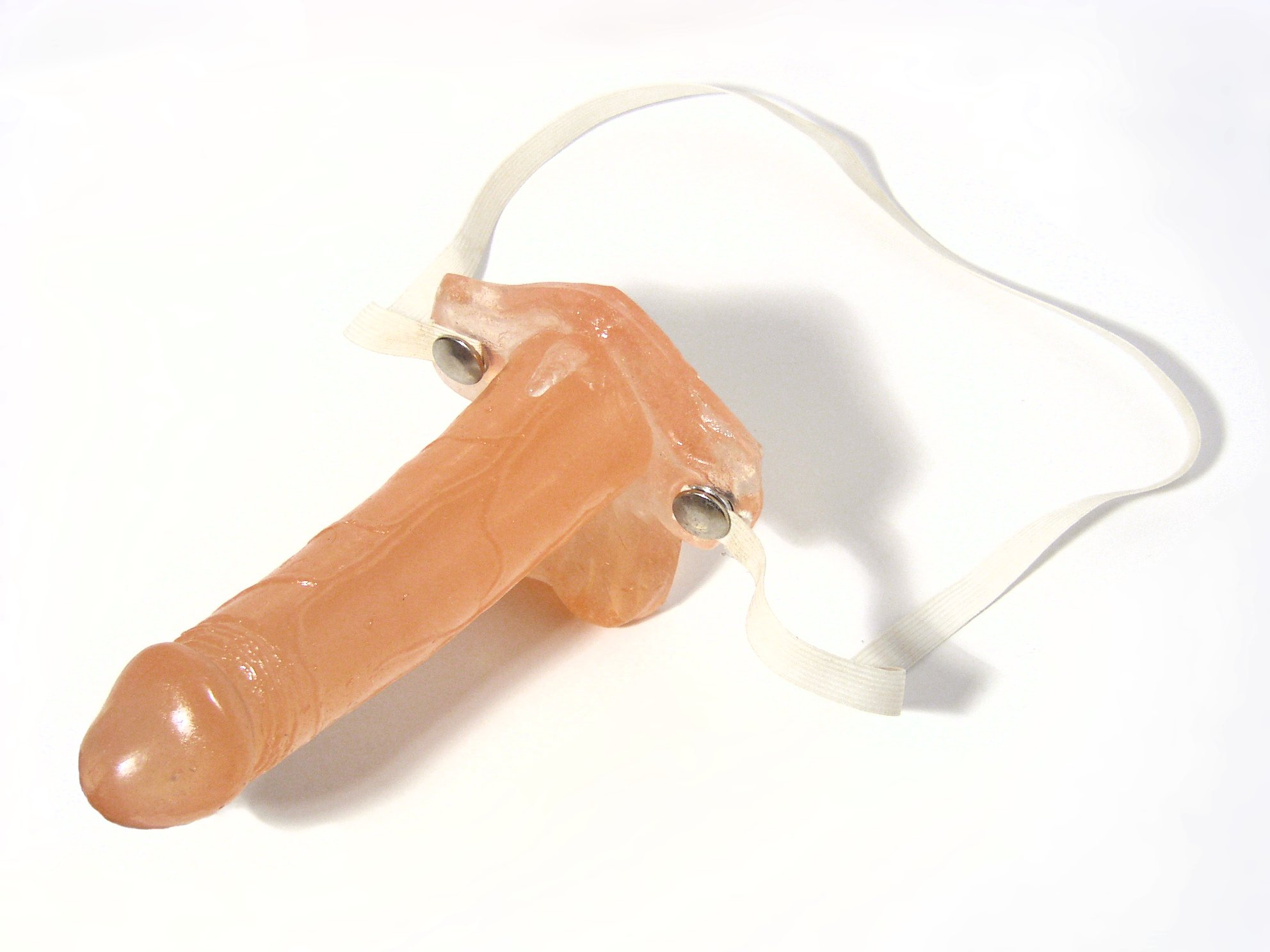
Inexpensive dildo with molded snaps

Some very cheap "strap-on dildos" have straps or attachments for straps directly molded into the material of the dildo. This design is very flimsy, and is only used on the cheapest products. They are essentially useless for the traditional purpose of a strap-on dildo (one partner penetrating another using a dildo in a position similar to a penis), but can be strapped around chairs and other objects for a variety of other activities.

== Types ==
The most noticeable feature of any strap-on setup is the dildo used. A wide variety of dildos are available, and while the choices may be limited by the type of harness in use, generally one can choose from several common types. This section discusses the shape and features of the penetrating end of the dildo, not of the entire strap-on dildo or how it's attached, which can be found in the section on dildo attachment methods for the double dildo and strapless dildo.

=== Standard ===
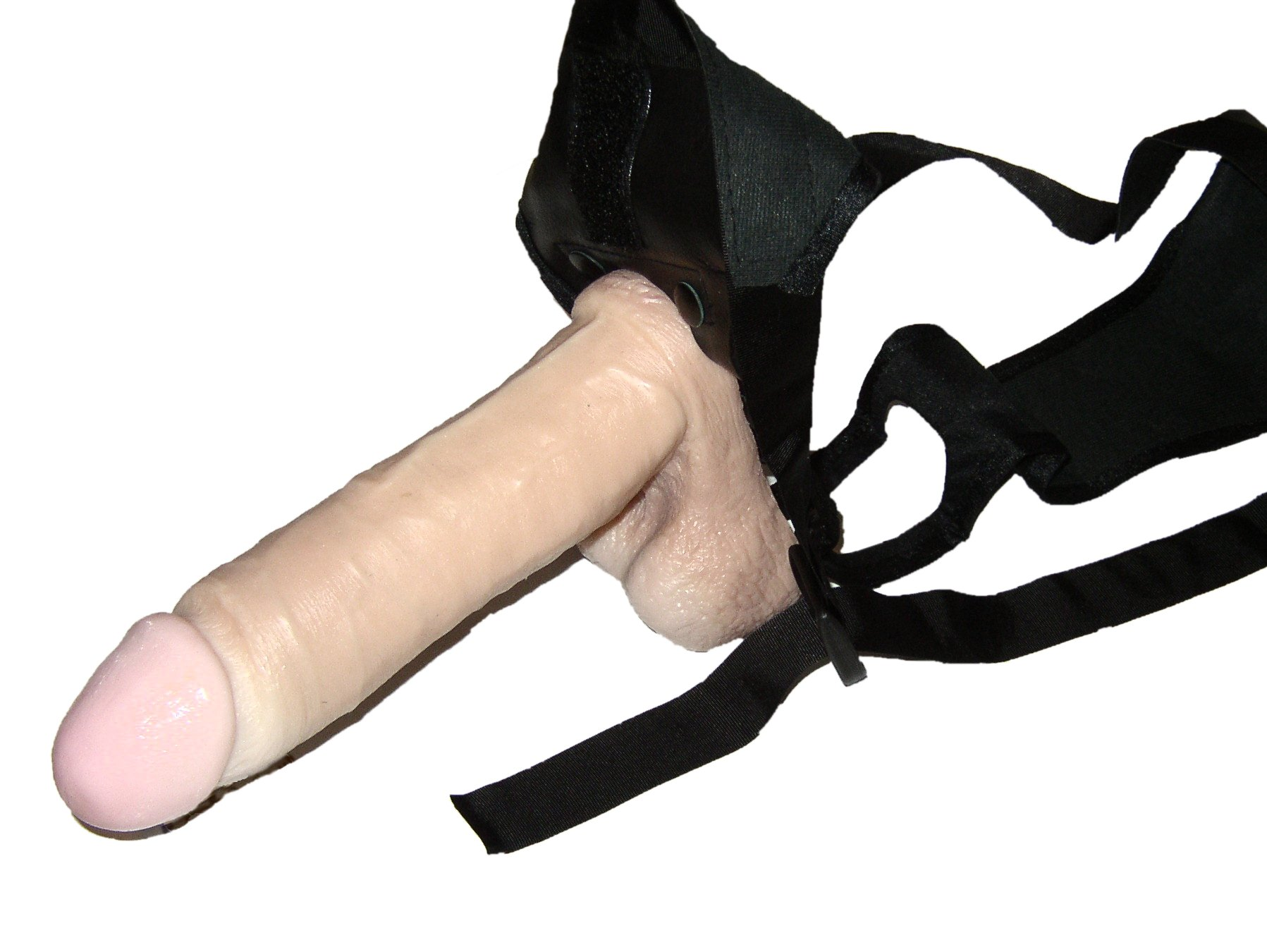
A standard dildo with crotchless Vac-u-lock harness

The standard dildo has a non-tapered or slightly tapered shaft, and often has an enlarged head, similar to a penis. The shaft may be slightly curved, but if it is strongly curved, it is often classified as a g-spot/prostate dildo as well. This type is by far the most popular, both for vaginal and anal use, although some beginners prefer a probe-type dildo. Depending on the type of harness the dildo is meant for, it may have molded testicles as part of the base, which many people say gives more pleasure and helps keep the dildo from "bottoming out." Standard dildos are the most common by a large margin, and are available in virtually any length and width, material, texture, etc.

=== Probe ===
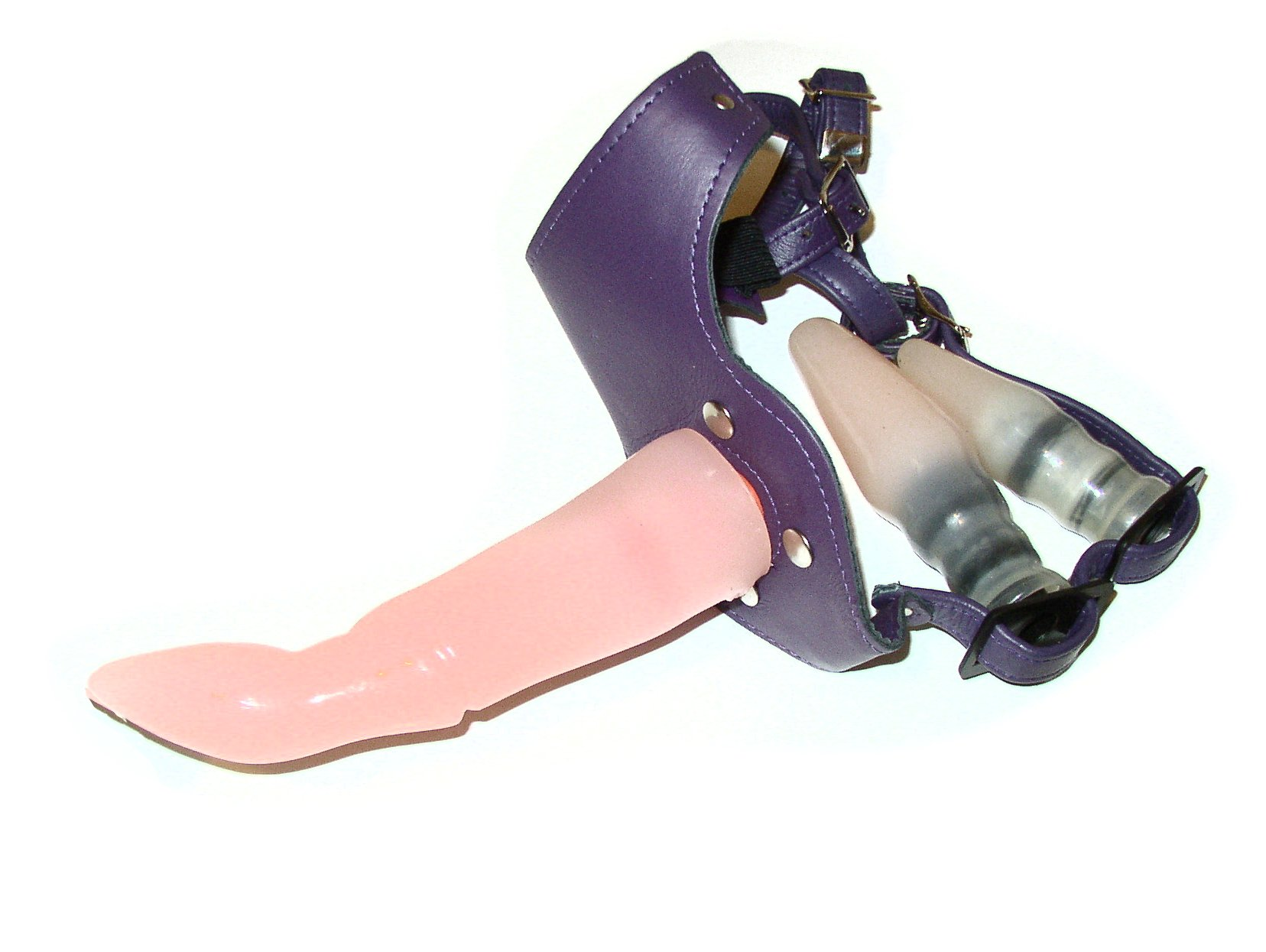
A combination probe and G-spot dildo with a Vac-u-lock harness

A probe dildo is often highly tapered, and many resemble a cone in overall shape, or may have a narrow diameter its entire length, although ones resembling an elongated butt plug are also common, their defining feature being a bulb in the middle which tapers down again towards the harness before flaring wider. These dildos are often advertised as being for beginners, especially newcomers to pegging, who may find a narrow, tapered dildo easier to start with if they have never had anal penetration before. Many people find that once they are familiar with the activity, the probe dildos are inadequate and unsatisfying, and purchase a standard dildo to use with their harness. Due to this, many kits include both a probe dildo and a standard dildo, so it is not necessary to purchase another.

=== G-spot and prostate ===
Dildos designed for G-spot or prostate stimulation often have a sharp upwards curve at the head, or gradual but still strong curvature the entire length. When used in many sexual positions, the curve causes strong pressure against the G-spot in women or the prostate in men. Some men report that strong prostate stimulation is important for an anal orgasm, while others report it as a distraction rather than a help. When using one of these dildos for the first time, care should be taken at first to make sure it's comfortable for the receiver, as the strong bend can be difficult to insert or control. For many positions, such as doggy style, the curved tip should point downwards, as otherwise it points in the wrong direction for either G-spot or prostate stimulation.

=== Textured ===
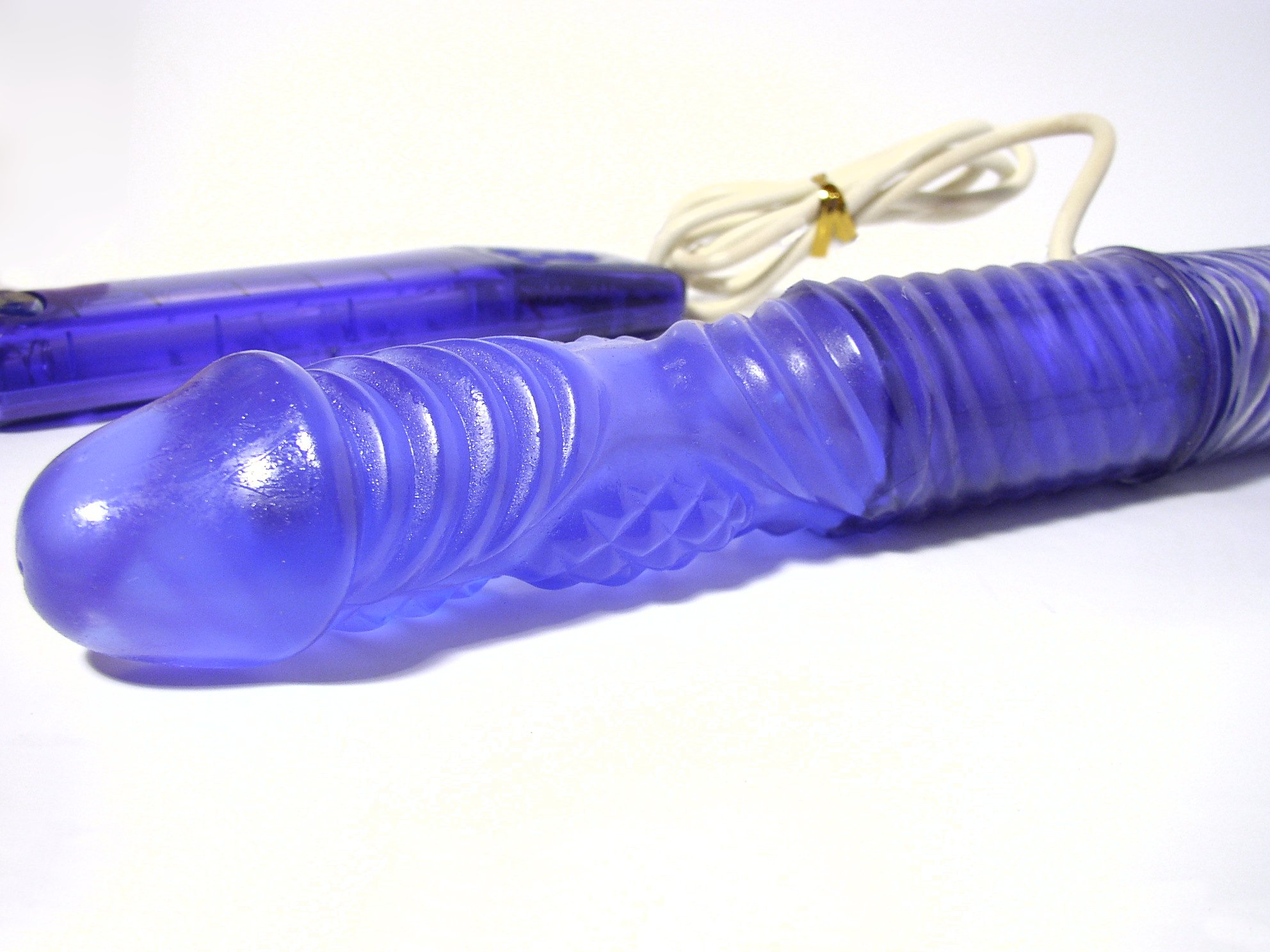
End of textured double dildo

For added stimulation, many dildos for harness use are manufactured with bulbs along their length, or having ripples, bumps, or other shapes on the surface to increase the stimulation given to the receiver. A bulbous dildo causes repeated expansion of the vaginal opening when used for vaginal penetration or of the anus when used for anal penetration, and causes a unique pulsating effect and additional stimulation. Ripples along the length of the dildo increase friction and cause a washboard effect, which some people find increases their pleasure, while others find tend to cause numbness. Individual bumps or a water droplet texture on the shaft also causes extra stimulation, and often avoids the washboard effect of evenly spaced ripples. Some dildos modeled to be realistic penises contain very heavy vein textures on the surface, causing a similar effect.

=== Vibrating and rotating ===
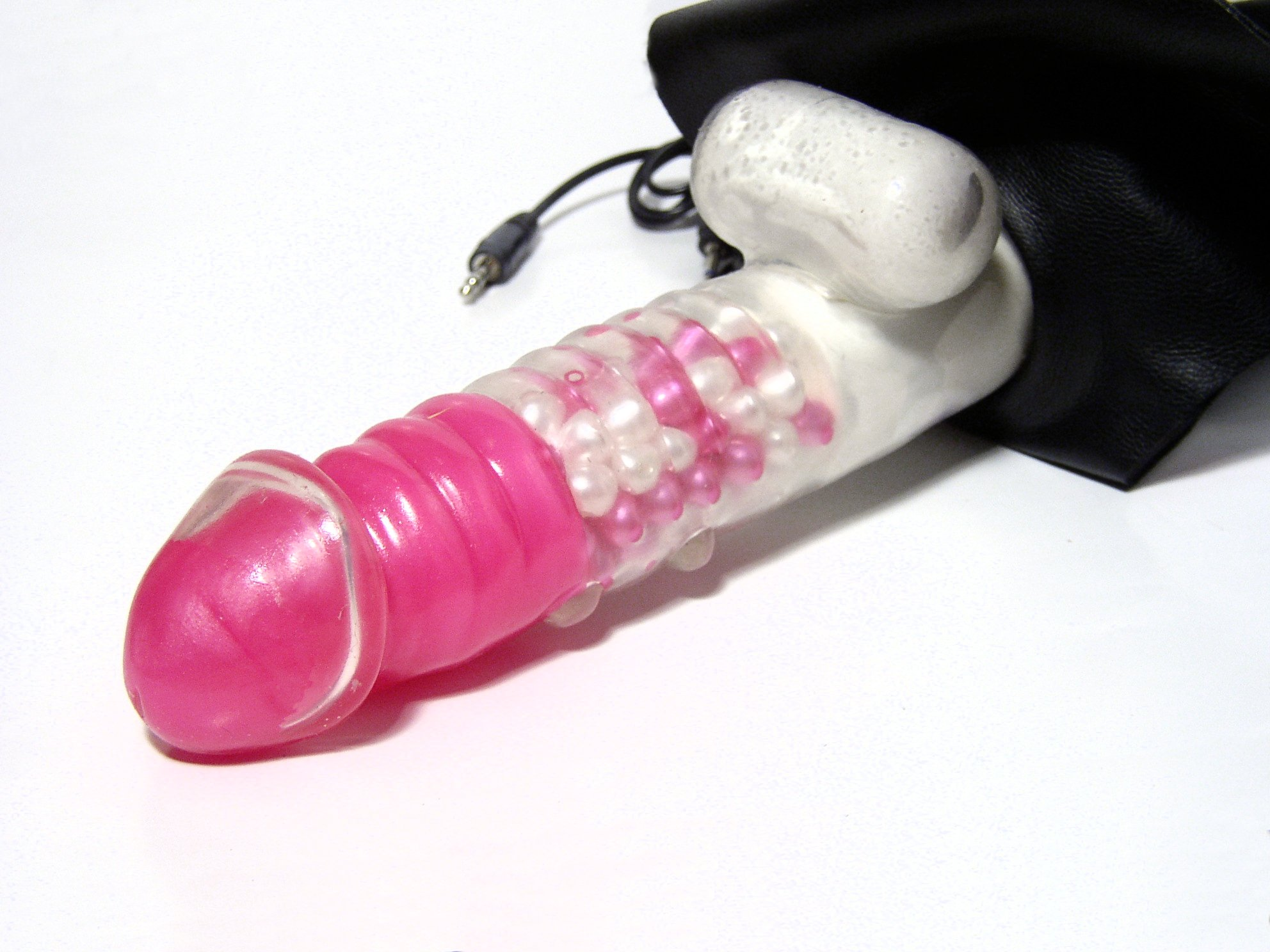
Multi-function dildo with rotating beads and vibrating egg

Some dildos, especially recent ones, may have rotating beads along the shaft, a wiggling shaft, vibrating ticklers or other clitoral stimulation devices, or other features to give more pleasure to the user. While their effectiveness is a matter of opinion, they are becoming increasingly popular. An inexpensive design is basically a standard rabbit vibrator designed for harness use (often exactly the same toy with a slightly different base), while more expensive dildos are designed from the ground-up for harness use and are usually superior. Rotating beads provide extra stimulation of the vulva and vaginal opening when used for vaginal penetration or stimulation of the anus when used for anal penetration, while the various clitoral stimulation devices are generally intended only for vaginal intercourse. These dildos are often bulky or heavy, and like all other vibrators need a power source (usually batteries in a pack that clips onto the harness or slips into a pocket on it), but can provide additional stimulation for those who desire it.

=== Double penetration ===
Double penetration dildos are generally two dildos molded onto a common base, designed for simultaneous vaginal and anal penetration or simultaneous vaginal and vaginal penetration, not to be confused with a man using a strap-on along with his penis for double penetration, which is discussed below. A typical double-penetration dildo has a longer, thicker main shaft for vaginal penetration, and a shorter, thinner, often more curved shaft for anal penetration. Although rare, dildos with the anal shaft being equally as large as the vaginal shaft are available for women who find a larger anal dildo more satisfying. These dildos tend to greatly limit the possible positions they are used in, as the angle has to be right for both vaginal and anal penetration when thrusting.

=== Specialty functions ===
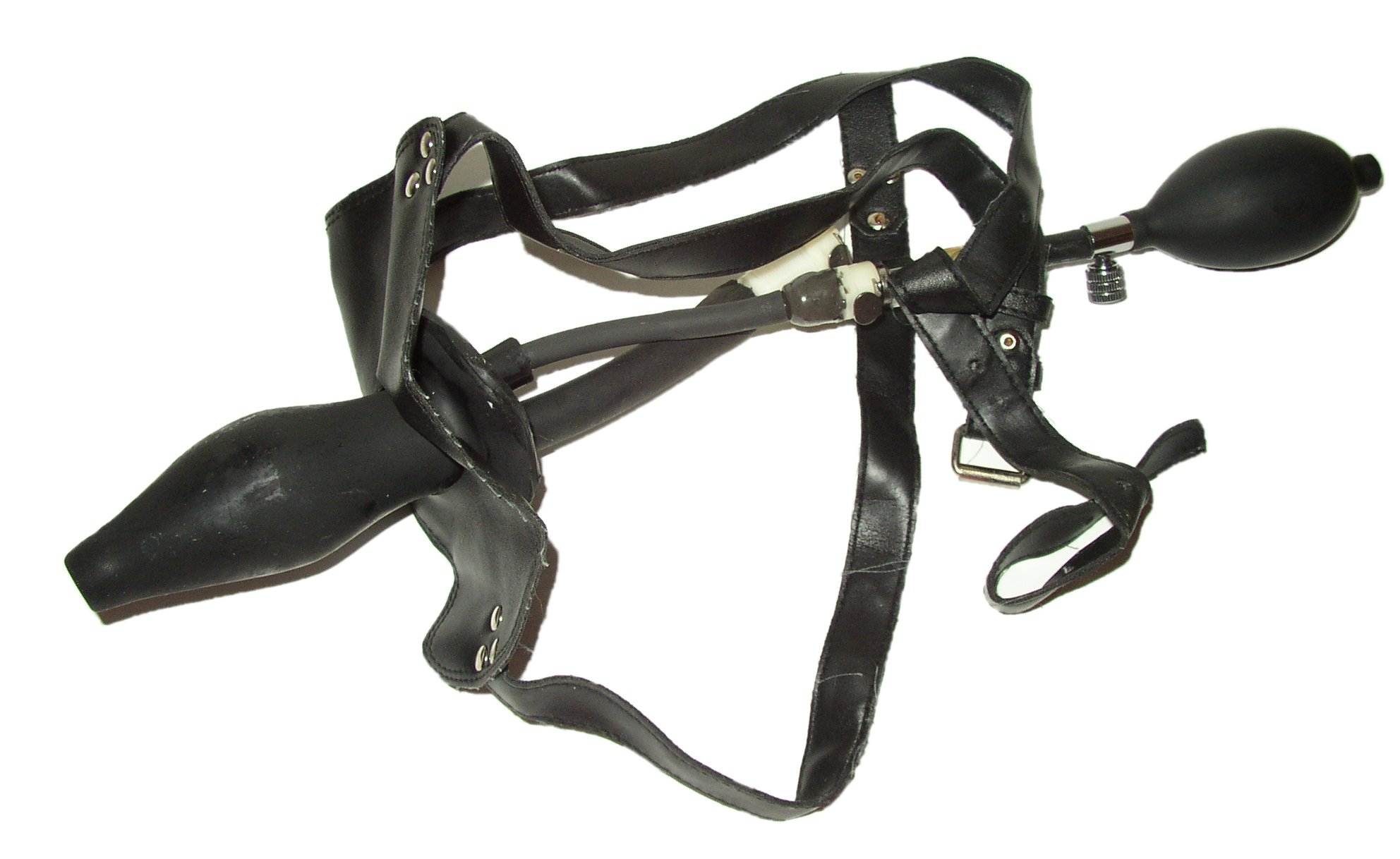
Inflatable enema nozzle

Many specialty dildos are available, such as ones that expand when an attached inflator bulb is squeezed, simulate ejaculation by releasing warm water on demand when a reservoir is compressed, or function as enema nozzles, allowing an enema to be given while using the strap-on for anal intercourse. Inflatable dildos generally expand in girth when inflated (they usually come with a simple hand-squeeze inflator bulb), allowing the dildo to keep expanding during intercourse as the receiver slowly stretches, giving a unique completely filled feeling which is hard to obtain using normal dildos. Ejaculating dildos contain a squeeze bulb or other reservoir, which when filled with hot water beforehand, allows the wearer to release their contents into the receiver at the proper moment. Enema nozzle dildos contain tubing connections, and when used for anal penetration (most often with silicone lube, as water-soluble lube would quickly break down when combined with an enema) allow the receiver to receive an enema during intercourse. Some BDSM mistresses specialize in offering this service. A relatively new product in this field is dildos with electrodes for erotic electrostimulation, further increasing the range of sensations the receiver can experience.

=== Penis extensions ===
Hollow dildos are often sold as penis extensions to increase size (length and/or girth), but the most common use is for men with erectile dysfunction. The penis is inserted into the hollow inside of the dildo, then the harness is put on, allowing the man to penetrate his partner with the dildo, the thrusting of which is transferred to his penis.

Visual showcase of a human penis with different types of penis extenders.

=== Foreskin ===
Dildos with retractable foreskins are made to try to give a natural feel. They can often have fake veins in order to enhance this feel.

== Wearer stimulation methods ==
Pleasure for the wearer of the strap-on generally comes from pressure against the genitals, particularly the clitoris, during use and from psychological arousal. Many designs of strap-on have various features to increase the stimulation of the wearer.

Some harnesses intentionally leave the genital area and anus open (either intentionally with an opening in the material or by the design simply not having any straps that would cover it), which allows any toy to be used for the stimulation of the wearer, or even for the wearer to be penetrated while wearing the strap-on. This can often be useful when the partners wish to switch roles during their play, as the strap-on can be put on before hand without interfering or needing to be taken off for play to continue. This type of harness is ill-suited for using toys, as the harness would not touch the toys, preventing them from falling out while thrusting and not providing movement to them from the harness.

=== External ===
==== Built-in features ====
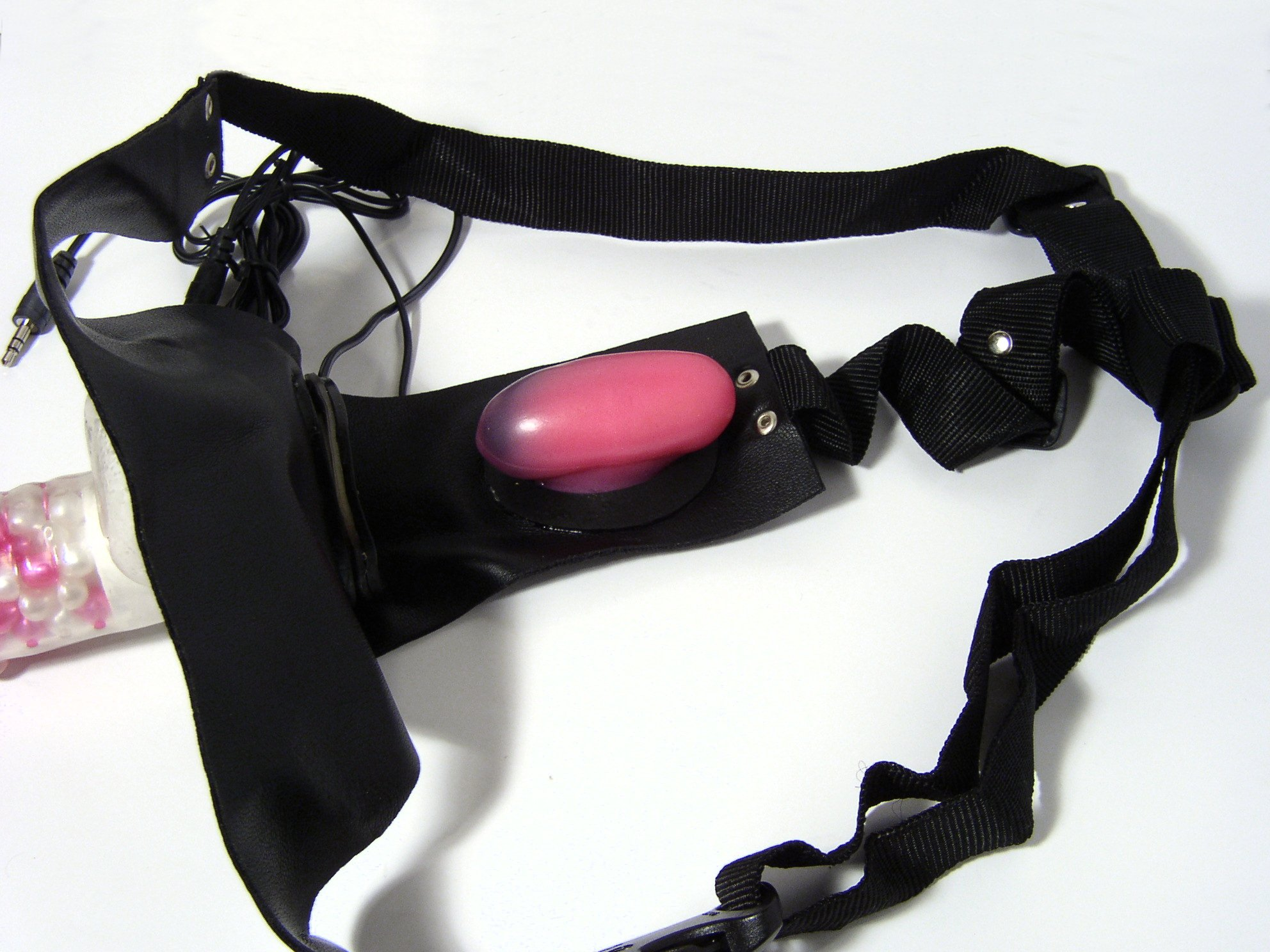
Jelly-coated vibrating egg

Some harnesses and dildos provide raised bumps or other features designed to rub against the clitoris of the wearer, either attached to the inside of the harness, or on the back of the base of the dildo. Harnesses that work with such dildos have to have an open back, where the base of the dildo presses directly against the user's body. As high-quality harnesses usually have padding or other means of attaching the dildo to the harness than a simple opening, these features are usually only seen on low-quality, inexpensive dildos. They provide only limited stimulation, and while better than nothing, are usually considered inferior to other types.

==== Vibrators ====
Another means of providing stimulation to the wearer is a vibrating egg, "clit blaster", vibrating gel pads or whiskers, or other device mounted on the inside of the strapon. These are almost always intended for use by people with vulva, as the external vibrator is rarely positioned well nor provides stimulation for a penis. These devices provide external stimulation to the clitoris, vagina, and other parts of the vulva, but do not provide any penetrative stimulation or anal stimulation.

=== Internal ===
==== Double-ended attachments ====
While a double dildo obviously would provide stimulation to the wearer as well, the standard straight dildo is very poorly suited for harness use. To overcome this, many dildos are available for harness use that have an offset in the middle, with the main driver key or attachment and a smaller vaginal attachment for the wearer having a flat vertical section between them. This way, the main attachment is at a good angle and position for thrusting, while its movement is transmitted directly to the vaginal plug and clitoris of the wearer.

==== Plugs ====
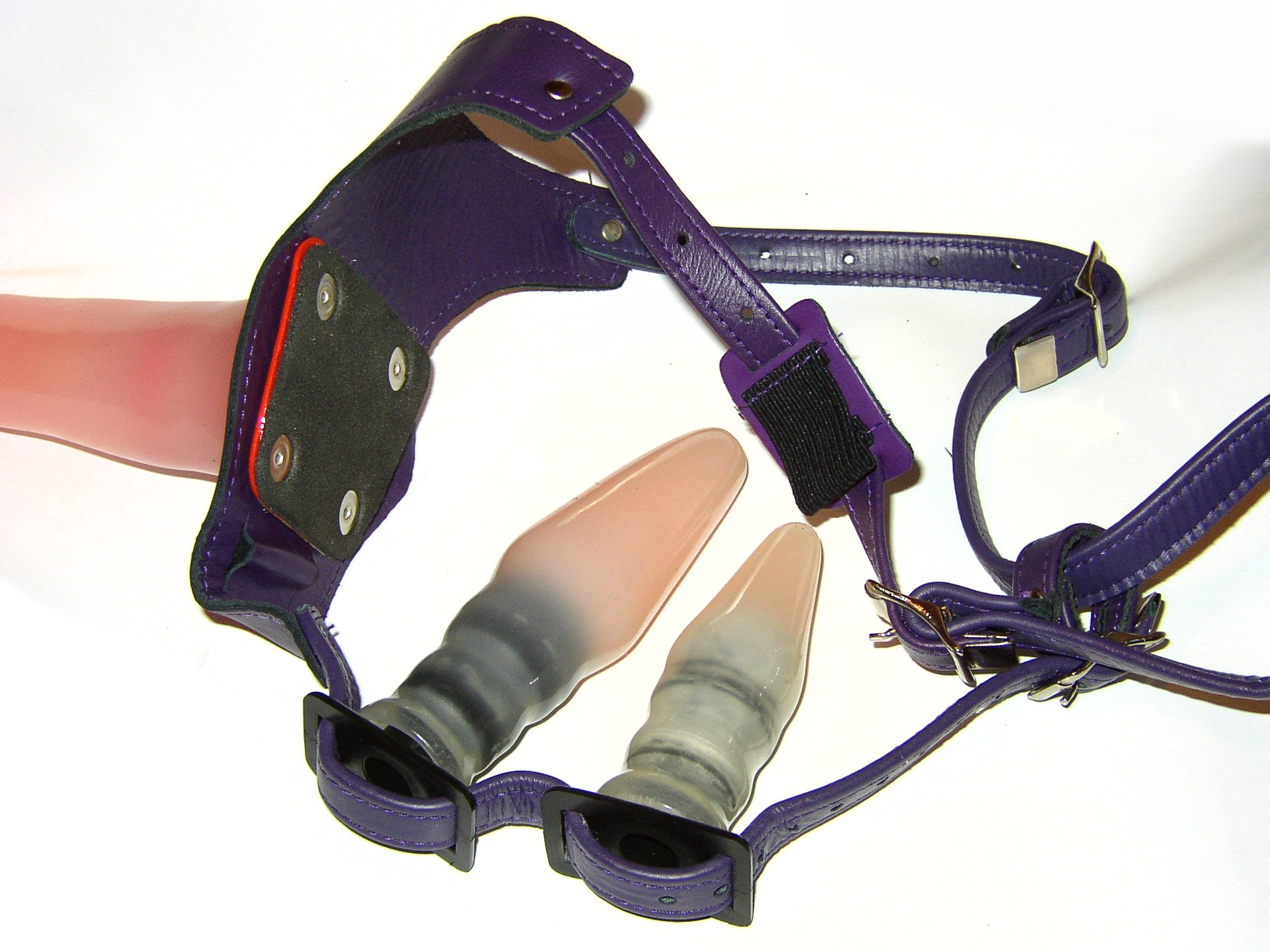
Strap-on harness with dual internal plugs

Many of the "professional" harnesses have one or two plugs (vaginal, anal, or both) on the inside of the harness, to penetrate the wearer. These plugs (may be shaped either like small dildos, the standard butt plug shape, or a combination/hybrid thereof) are usually firmly attached to the harness, and provide stimulation to the wearer as they thrust with the main dildo. Some harnesses may only come with the anal plug while others come with both plugs; most report the latter provides the more pleasure than using one.

While a plug can be used in combination with most any harness, just by inserting the plugs before putting on the harness, all the harness tends to do is push the plugs in, and not move them as to provide stimulation when the wearer thrusts. Depending on the type of harness, different ways are used to properly attach plugs to the harness. A common type consists of an opening or rubber ring with a cloth or leather back, similar to what might be used to hold the main dildo to the front of the harness, but positioned over the anus, vagina, or ones for both. A dildo/plug with a wide base is inserted through the ring, then when the harness is put on, the material pulls tight against it, holding it firm. For vac-u-lock harnesses, one or two additional vac-u-lock plugs are mounted on the inside of the harness, allowing any vac-u-lock attachment to be used. Most vac-u-lock harnesses that have the connectors for internal plugs come with two plug-shaped vac-u-lock attachments, a smaller one for anal use and a larger one for vaginal use. Like other types of harnesses, both plugs may be used at once, and often are separately adjustable on the strap to fit the wearer's body.

== Sexual positions ==
A number of positions can be performed using a strap-on dildo. These include but are not limited to:

- Doggy style: Doggy style is popular as it is simple, easy, and allows deep thrusting. The receptive partner kneels down with their face against the bed (or other surface), and is penetrated from behind. This position works well for both vaginal and anal penetration, and allows deep, smooth strokes. It sometimes stimulates the prostate less than other positions during pegging.
- Missionary: The missionary position is also popular, and allows both partners to cuddle, see each other, kiss, or perform other activities during intercourse. When used for anal penetration, a pillow or other object placed under the buttocks of the receiver will elevate the anus to a comfortable position and angle.
- Bent over: Usually used for pegging, the receptive partner stands or kneels while leaning forwards, supported by the bed, chair, wall, or other object. Similar to doggy style, the penetration is from behind. This position angles the dildo such that it typically strokes firmly across the prostate, which for some men can lead to an anal orgasm much more effectively.

== Uses ==
Even more than the different types of harnesses and dildos, there are different ways to make use of a strap-on setup. Generally ways of using them can be divided into several broad categories, each with variations.

- Pegging: Is when a woman uses a strap-on dildo to penetrate a man anally.
- Sex between women: Female, same-sex intercourse is one of the more common uses of strapons. Strap-ons are one means for women to enjoy penetration with their sex partner.
- Erectile dysfunction: Men with erectile dysfunction may use a strap-on to be able to penetrate their partner either by using one with a hollow dildo, or by having their penis beneath the dildo. For example, in one documented case, a prostate cancer patient with erectile dysfunction due to anti-cancer androgen deprivation therapy would penetrate his partner with the dildo while she manually stimulated his penis. The report includes a narrative by the patient of his experience where he writes that although he and his partner were initially reluctant, they became highly satisfied, beyond their previous sexual experience as a couple: He found more comfortable without the worry of whether he would be able to keep an erection, and experienced multiple orgasms, felt more diffuse and spreading from his pelvis. His partner reliably achieved orgasm, whereas previously she did not have orgasms by penetration alone. The fact that the man experienced multiple orgasms is very likely because of his low level of androgens and because he had his prostate removed; the same phenomenon has been noticed in other prostate cancer patients.
- Double penetration: Some women find simultaneous vaginal and anal penetration to be enjoyable, and aside from using a double-penetration dildo discussed previously, can experience this with a male partner using a strap-on. A harness is selected that allows the man's penis to extend under the dildo of the harness, thereby allowing him to insert both his penis and the dildo into his partner. In a face-to-face position (such as the missionary position) the penis would penetrate the anus and the dildo the vagina; in a position such as doggy style the penis would penetrate the vagina and the dildo the anus.
- Masturbation: Non-traditional harnesses, such as furniture attachments and ride-on balls, can be used for masturbation by both men and women. A ride-on ball can take the position of another person, in that it can be on bottom for most positions that have the person being penetrated on top, and furniture harnesses can be attached to many objects, an example being a bathtub, to penetrate the user doggy-style before or in a bath.
- Transgender people: Some transgender people use a strap-on to provide the function of a penis, for example trans men, as they were not originally born with one. This option may appeal to people who have not undergone surgery, for any one of many reasons. Strap-ons may also be used by trans women, who are either genitally post-operative or not using their own phallus.
- Premature ejaculation: In couples where a male partner suffers from premature ejaculation, a strap-on can be used to prolong penetrative sex in order to sexually satisfy the other partner. This practice may feel more personal and satisfying than other types of non-penetrative sex since pelvic thrusting is involved, and the pace is set by the male partner experiencing the premature ejaculation. The strap-on can be in a size similar to the wearer, or the couple can experiment with other sizes or shapes.
- Orgasm denial: Some couples who practice BDSM use a strap-on to allow penetrative vaginal sex while denying the male partner the ability to orgasm as a form of erotic sexual denial. This is distinct from pegging, as the strap-on in this case replaces the penis of the male. In addition to wearing the strap-on, the male may also sometimes wear a chastity belt. The strap-on can substitute the penis either as a form of foreplay, or for the complete duration of the intercourse.
- Fellatio: Many people, using a strap-on for any of the above purposes, often like to either suck or have a partner suck a strap-on, performing fellatio on it. The reasons given vary; possible reasons include power or role reversal. If complemented with erotic stimulation (e.g., manual stimulation of the penis or the clitoris) and the receiving partner is willing to engage in suspension of disbelief, this can give the illusion to the wearer of the sensation of having their own penis stimulated, similar to the rubber hand illusion. In the narrative of the prostate cancer patient (see above), he reported receiving oral sex with the dildo and apparently found it satisfying, again after being initially reluctant of the idea.
- Contactless lovemaking: Some individuals and couples of all genders, and those with an encasement or total enclosure fetish, enjoy sex while fully covered in various erotic clothing and do not wish to see, touch, or feel any uncovered skin during intercourse as it is considered undesirable. A hollow vibrating dildo is integral, as it covers the penis and provides penetrative and mechanical stimulation in an intentionally artificial manner, eliminating direct genital contact. The dildo vibrations also replace thrusting, allowing the partners to fully focus on the sights and sensations of interacting with each other's garments as they are pleasured by the vibrations. In addition to an enveloping dildo, contactless lovemaking commonly entails the wearing of long gloves, masks, full body veils, stockings, boots or other garments as necessary to ensure complete bodily concealment.

Almost every position associated with sexual intercourse (or not, in the case of simultaneous penetration) can be performed with a strap-on. Indeed, with other harnesses that allow a dildo to be mounted on inanimate objects, endless new positions can be conceived.

== Feminist views ==
There are contradicting views among feminists on the use of strap-ons in sex. Some feminists argue that strap-on sex reinforces patriarchal structures and undermines feminist principles, asserting that fantasies should align with ethical values. They criticize feminists who engage in strap-on sex as hypocritical. However, others share these concerns but question whether politics should be brought into the bedroom, while some oppose the notion that strap-on sex is inherently linked to patriarchy.

== See also ==
- Double penetration dildo
- Sex toy
