= Prostate massage =

Massage of the prostate gland via the rectum or perineum

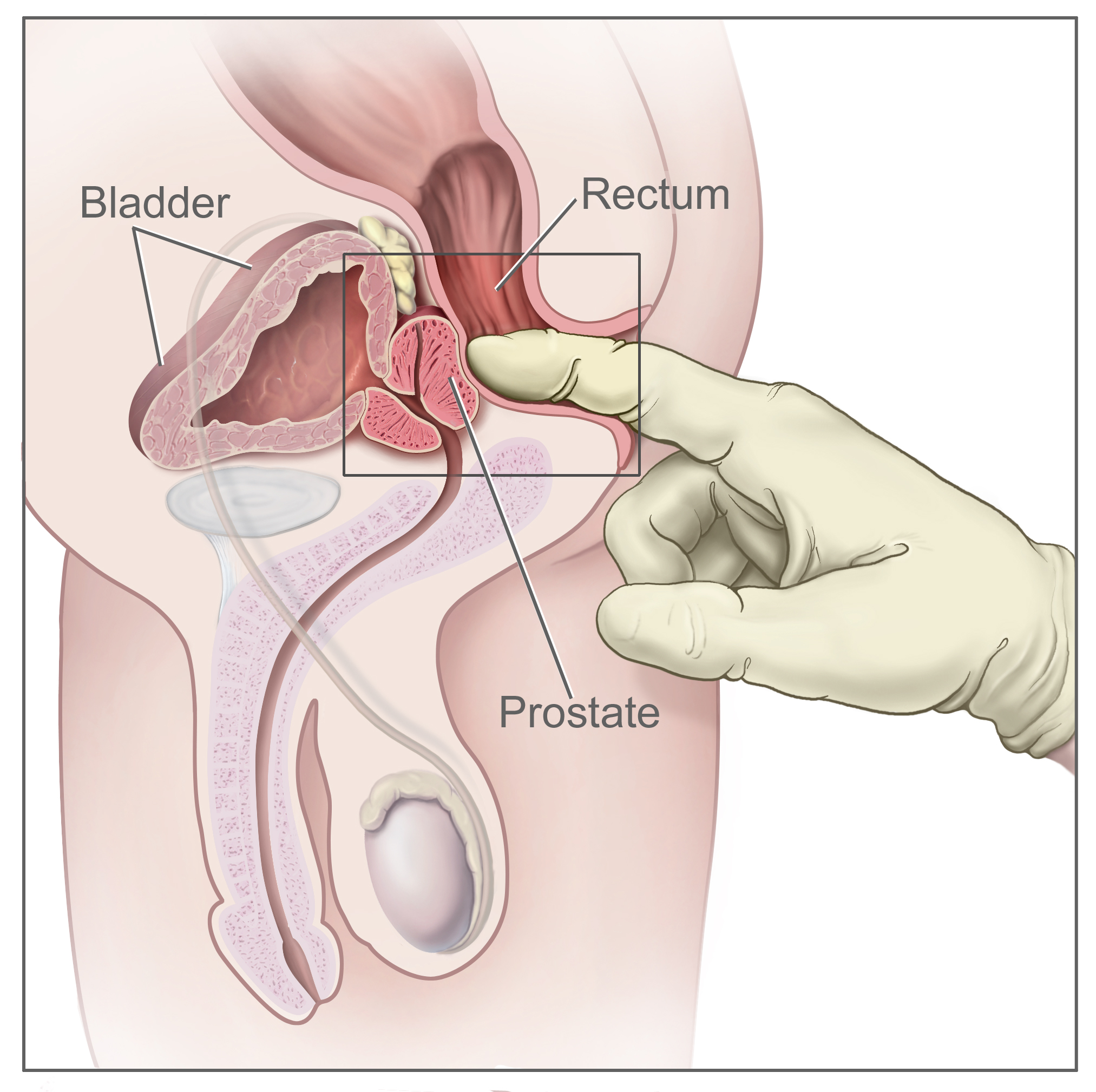
Stimulation of the prostate via the rectum

Prostate massage is the massage or stimulation of the male prostate gland for medical purposes or sexual stimulation.

The prostate takes part in the sexual response cycle and is essential for the production of semen. Due to its proximity to the anterior rectal wall, it can be stimulated from the anterior wall of the rectum or externally via the perineum.

== Medical uses ==
=== Digital rectal examination ===
Prostate massage is part of the digital rectal examination (DRE) routinely given to males by urologists to look for nodules of prostate cancer and to obtain an expressed prostatic secretion (EPS) specimen for microscopy and microbiological culture to screen for prostatitis.

==== Therapy for prostatitis ====
In the late 1990s, a small number of doctors tried prostate massage in conjunction with antibiotics for the treatment of chronic bacterial prostatitis with uncertain results. In recent trials, however, prostate massage was not shown to improve outcomes compared to antibiotics alone. As a consequence of these findings, prostate massage is not officially sanctioned in medicine for the treatment of any medical disorder. Prostatic massage should never be performed on patients with acute prostatitis, because the infection can spread elsewhere in the body if massage is performed.

==== History ====
Once the most popular therapeutic maneuver used to treat prostatitis, it was abandoned as primary therapy in the 1960s.

In the late 1990s, the ineffectiveness of drug treatments for chronic prostatitis led to a brief resurgence of interest in prostate massage. In a recent trial, however, prostate massage was not shown to improve outcomes compared to antibiotics alone.

The practice is still used in some parts of China.

=== Risks ===
Vigorous prostate massage has been documented to have injurious consequences: periprostatic hemorrhage, cellulitis, septicaemia, possible disturbance and metastasis of prostate cancer to other parts of the body, and hemorrhoidal flare-up, and rectal fissures.

=== Electroejaculation ===
Electroejaculation is a procedure in which nerves are stimulated via an electric probe, which is inserted into the rectum adjacent to the prostate. The stimulus voltage stimulates nearby nerves, resulting in contraction of the pelvic muscles and ejaculation. It is most commonly encountered in animal husbandry for collecting semen samples for testing or breeding. Some devices are used under general anesthesia on humans who have certain types of anejaculation. Electroejaculation may also be used for posthumous sperm retrieval in humans. Electroejaculation is a different procedure from manual prostate massage.

== As a sexual practice ==
=== General ===
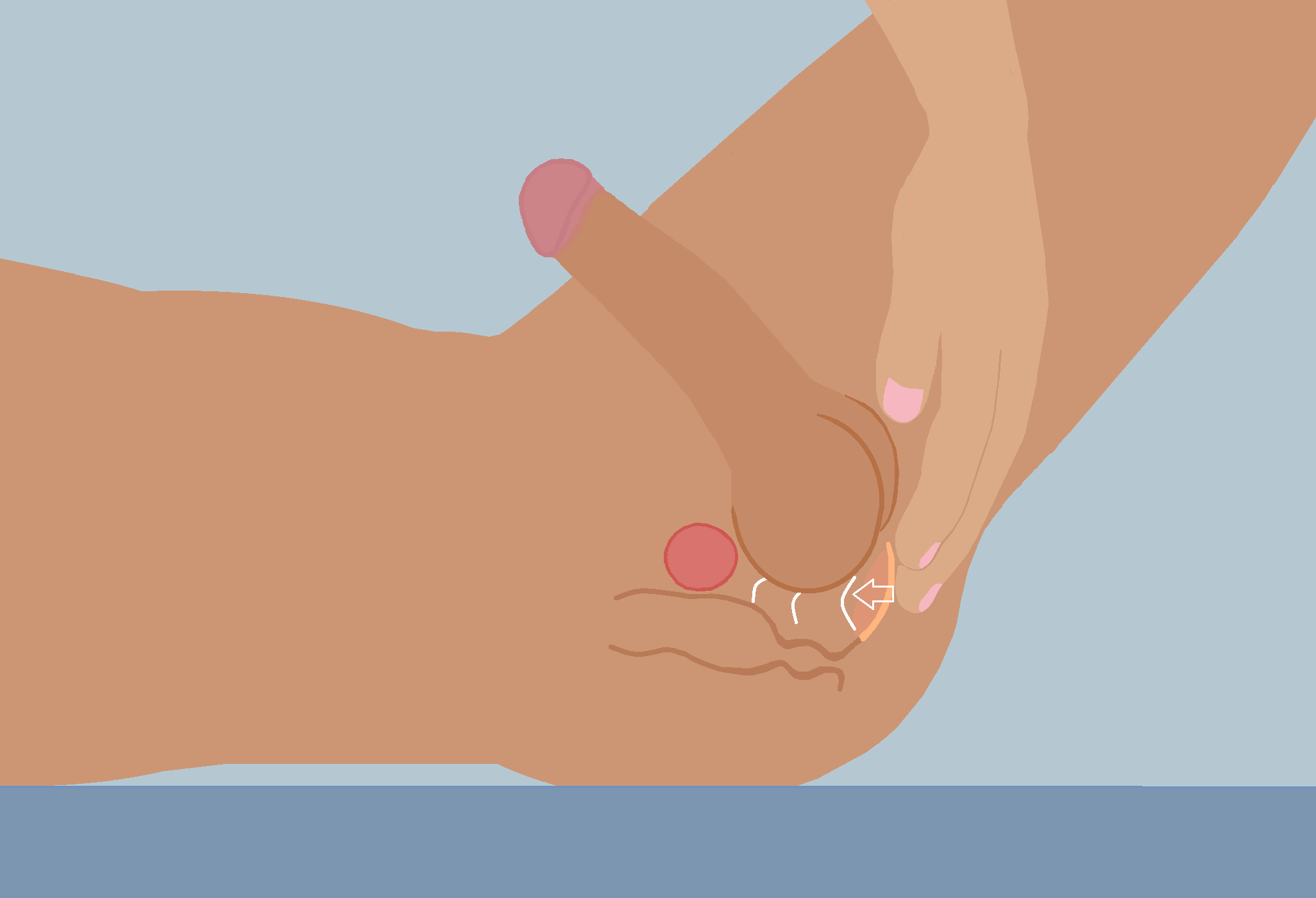
Stroking with pressure and gentle rhythmic squeezing on the perineum cause a transfer of pressure to the underlying tissues up to the prostate. Perineal massage can trigger sexual arousal or enhance it.

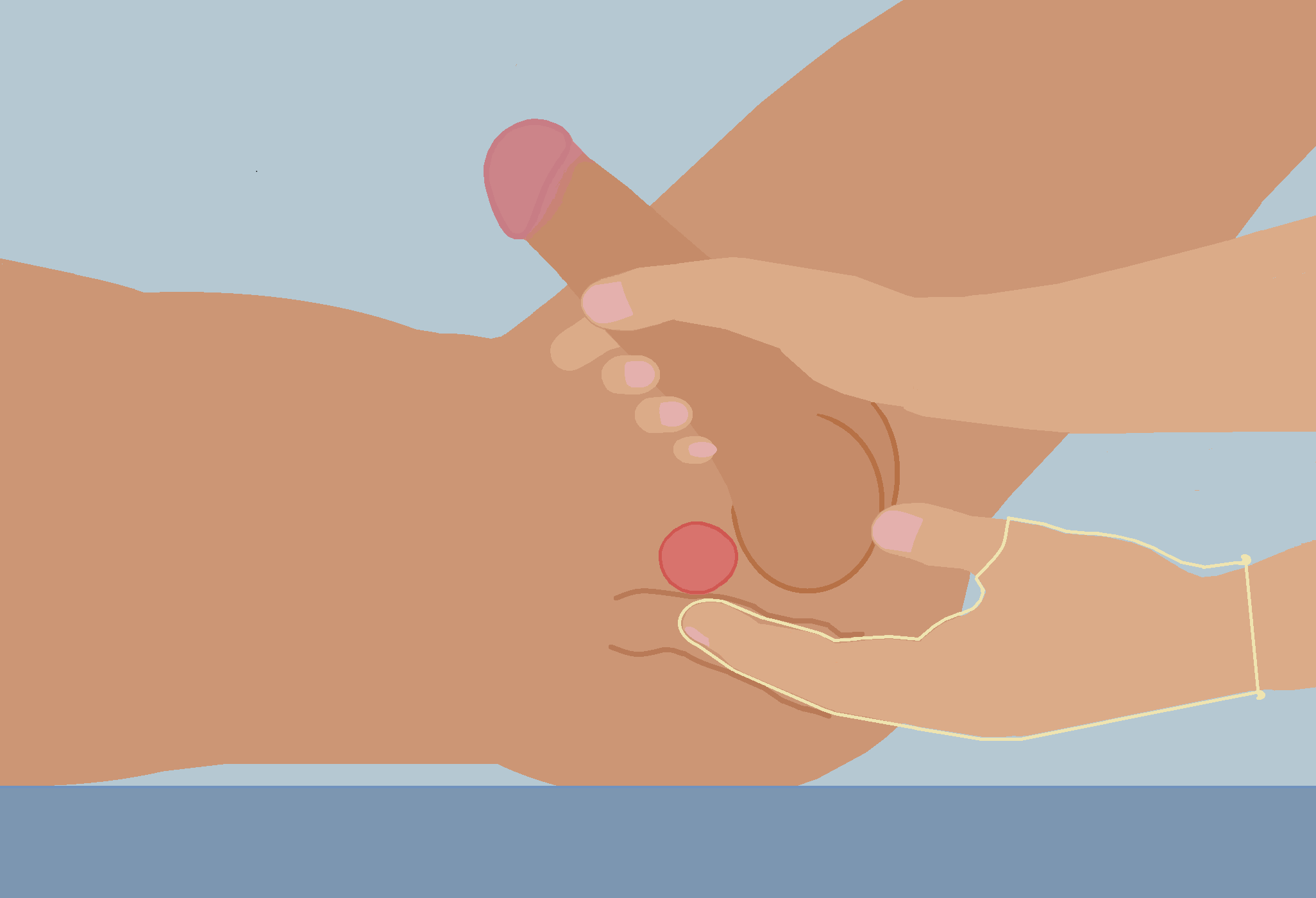
Insertion of a finger protected with a latex glove and coated with lubricant into the anus and lower rectum of a male in a lying position, where, after gently penetrating both sphincters the prostate, as a small roundish organ can be massaged together with the penis

Prostate massage is also used as an erotic massage for sexual stimulation, often to reach orgasm. The prostate is sometimes referred to as the "male G-spot" or "P-spot". Some males can achieve orgasm through stimulation of the prostate gland, such as prostate massage or receptive anal intercourse, and males who report the sensation of prostate stimulation often give descriptions similar to females' accounts of G-spot stimulation. Prostate stimulation can sometimes produce a strong, powerful orgasm. However, all male orgasms, including those by penile stimulation, involve muscular contractions in the prostate gland. It is possible for some males to achieve orgasms through prostate stimulation alone. Stimulation may be achieved by use of one or more fingers or by using sex toys designed to bring pressure to the anterior wall of the rectum at the location of the gland.

Prostate massage may be practiced between sexual partners, either as a discrete activity or during other sexual acts, stimulating the penis for example. The increasing availability (online via the Internet) of purpose-designed, safe, and hygienic sex toys and devices aimed at prostate stimulation may encourage sexual experimentation and incorporation into sex play. The use of a finger for anal penetration and prostate stimulation can enhance a male's orgasm or vary the sensations experienced during sexual arousal. The finger of the prostate massager is introduced into the rectum through the anus and the prostate gland is gently massaged via the anterior (front) wall of the rectum. In some individuals or for some massagers the correct location of the prostate may be slightly too deep or the finger too short to reach easily. Prostate massage can be performed individually or with the help of a partner.

Prostate massage may also be used in long-term orgasm denial play, for the purpose of relieving the immediate need for orgasm without impacting general feelings of arousal. For this purpose, it is often referred to as milking.

There are safety matters relating to prostate stimulation and anal penetration. It is strongly recommended that plenty of lubricant be used with prostate massagers to prevent rectal lining damage. A smaller instrument or finger may be introduced gradually to minimize the discomfort that some may feel. Massagers may be used with or without a condom; however, because of the bacteria found in the rectum, if a condom is not used, it is crucial to clean the tool with soap before use in another orifice or by a partner. Receiving anal stimulation may cause feelings of having to defecate; prostate stimulation in particular may cause the feeling of having to urinate. More often than not, this is just a sensation that the stimulation causes and may take some getting used to.

=== Equipment ===
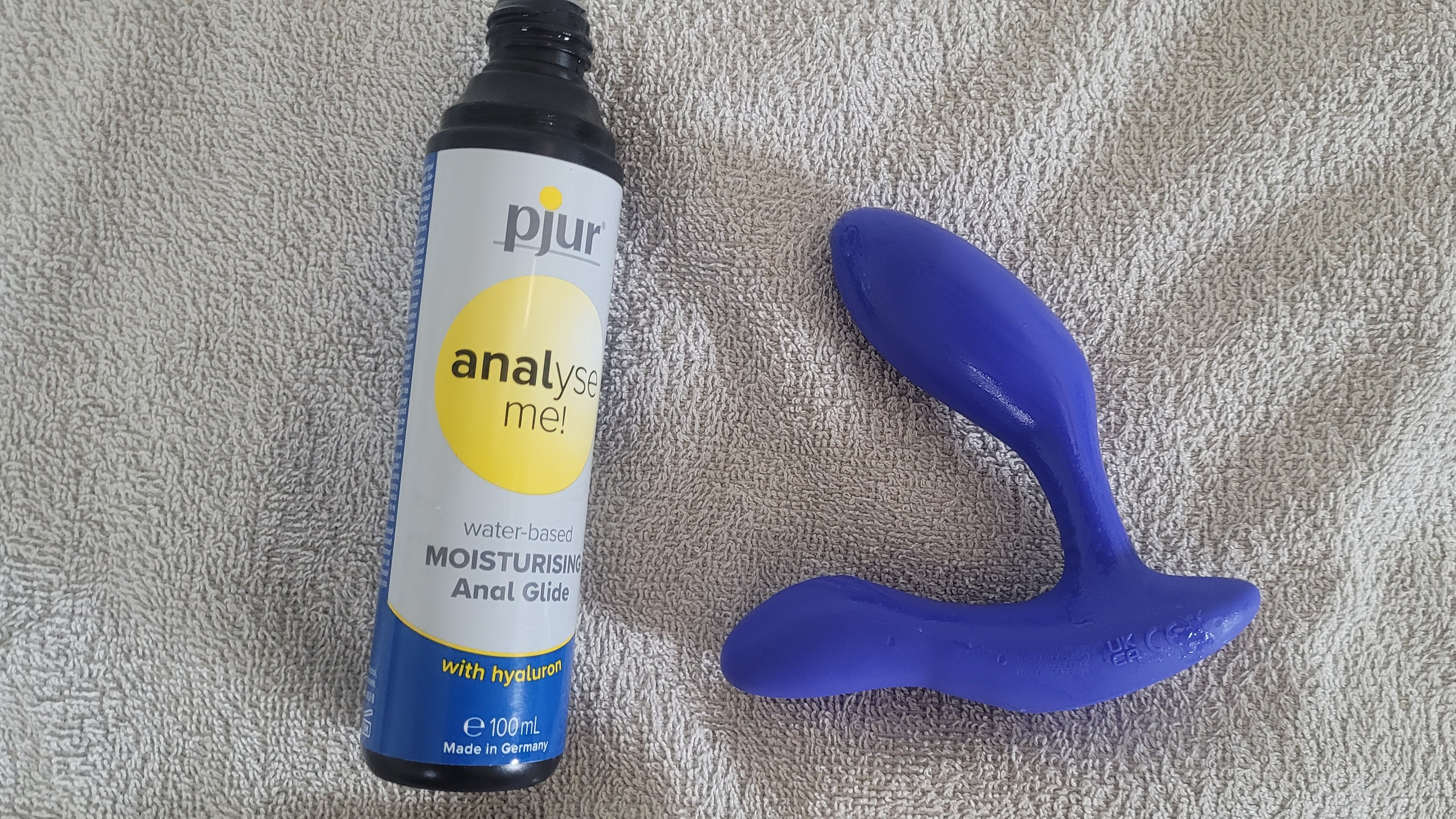
Vibrator for prostate stimulation

A prostate massager, or prostate stimulator, is a device for massaging the prostate gland. The shape of a prostate massager is similar to a finger since prostate massages are traditionally given digitally (for example, via fingering). They usually have a slightly curved head to effectively massage the prostate. Lubricant is usually necessary before inserting anything into the anus and helps to avoid injury to the rectal mucosa (lining). Caution should be exercised when a prostate massager is used because of the sensitivity of the prostate. Correct use involves a medium to light repetitive massage, or circular motion—the device being used to administer the massage should not be used too vigorously or without care, since this may lead to injury.

Prostate massage equipment ranges from dildos to butt plugs. When used in sexual practice, prostate massagers are commonly referred to as "prostate toys", "prostate sex toys", and "anal toys". These prostate massagers are inserted into the rectum through the anus and are intended to stimulate the prostate by simple massaging or vibrating. They are used during foreplay by many couples.

Prostate dildos are similar to vaginal dildos, but they tend to be more curved, slimmer, and with a softer texture. Some of the new prostate dildos on the market are driven by batteries and offer vibration at the tip, the speed or intensity of which may be changed depending on the subject's personal preference. Unlike vaginal dildos, the anal prostate massager has a flared end to prevent it from being fully inserted and 'lost' inside the rectum.

Some males prefer butt plugs, which are easy to use, and can be inserted freely and left in place while the male's hands are free for other sexual activities such as masturbation. Anal plugs also come in various shapes, sizes, and designs and are not commonly intended to stimulate the prostate. Newer, more angled models (second generation) of prostate massagers have been developed to provide a more direct and thorough prostate gland massage. These new devices feature a more curved shape and are slightly longer than the originals. They commonly have a narrow neck and a flared end to avoid losing them in the rectum. While many massagers rely upon the body's natural muscular contractions of the anal sphincter and anal wall to stimulate the prostate, some of the newer models come with vibrators built into them to increase sexual pleasure.

== See also ==
- Anal eroticism
- Anal sex
