= Lubricant (disambiguation) =

A lubricant is a substance introduced to reduce friction between surfaces in mutual contact.

Lubricant may also refer to:

- Dry lubricant
- Grease (lubricant)
- Personal lubricant
- Rust and oxidation lubricant
- Social lubricant
- Surgical lubricant

== See also ==
- Lube (disambiguation)
