= Stud (animal) =

Registered animal retained for breeding

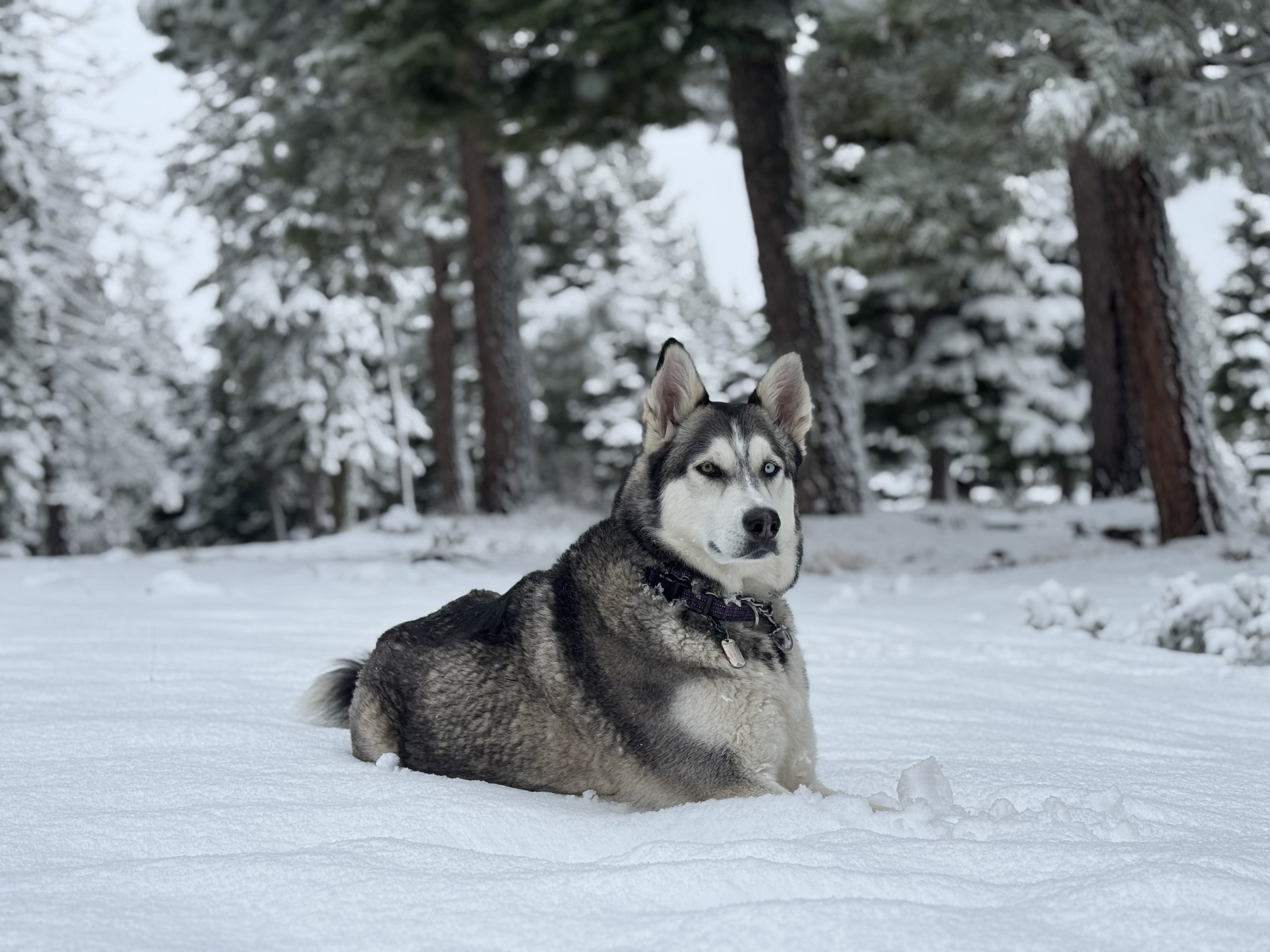
Husky stud.

A stud animal is a registered animal retained for breeding. The terms for the male of a given animal species (stallion, bull, rooster, etc.) usually imply that the animal is intact—that is, not castrated—and therefore capable of siring offspring. A specialized vocabulary exists for de-sexed animals (gelding, steer, etc.) and those animals used in grading up to a purebred status.

Stud females are generally used to breed further stud animals, but stud males may be used in crossbreeding programs. Both sexes of stud animals are regularly used in artificial breeding programs.

A stud farm, in animal husbandry, is an establishment for selective breeding using stud animals. This results in artificial selection.

== Stud fees ==
A stud fee is a price paid by the owner of a female animal, such as a horse or a dog, to the owner of a male animal for the right to breed to it. Service fees can range from a small amount for a local male animal of unknown breeding to several hundred thousand dollars for the right to breed a champion Thoroughbred race horse such as Storm Cat, who has earned stud fees of up to US$500,000.

Many owners of high-quality stallions also offer a dead foal guarantee with a breeding, usually defined as a guarantee that once the mare leaves the stud farm confirmed to be in foal by a veterinarian, she will give birth to a foal that stands and nurses, or else the stud farm will re-breed the mare for no stud fee the following season.

Most stud fees do not include the costs of boarding the female animal at the location of the stud animal, or the cost of collecting and shipping semen if artificial insemination is used in lieu of live cover. Any veterinary expenses or medications are also an additional cost to the owner of the female animal.

== See also ==
- Dog breeding
- Horse breeding
- Sheep farming
- Stud farm
