= Breeding mount =

Apparatus used to collect semen for artificial insemination

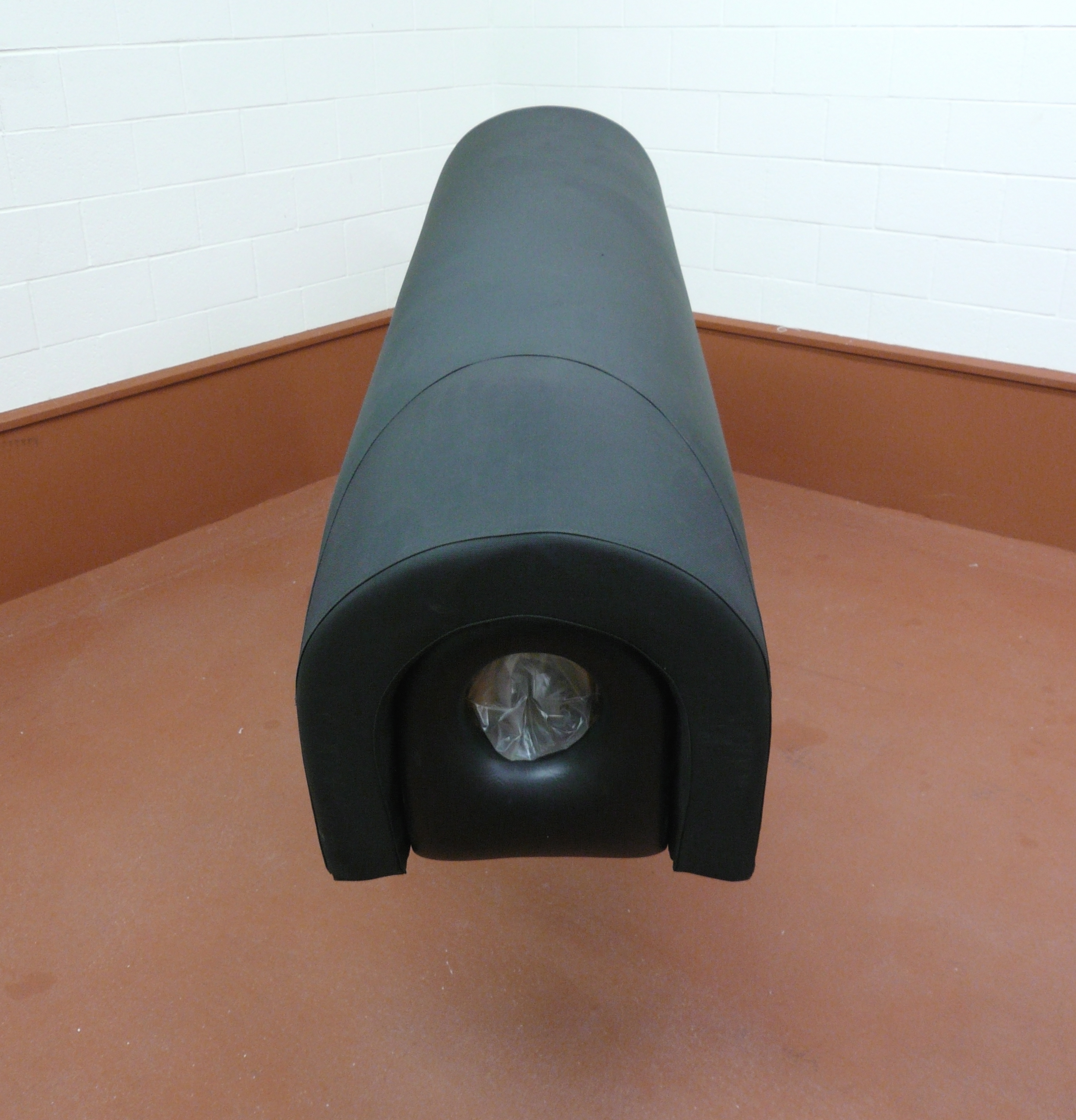
A breeding mount used to collect semen from horses

In animal breeding, a breeding mount, also known as a phantom mount, dummy mare and other names, is an imitation of a female animal used to hold an artificial vagina for semen collection, for artificial insemination respectively.

The male is encouraged to mount the imitation as if it were real. They are commonly used in conjunction with a real female of the same species nearby, to help bring the male to sufficient arousal for them to mount the breeding mount and initiate copulation and eventual ejaculation.

Once semen is collected, other equipment is then needed to store and preserve the semen for eventual examination and use.

== See also ==
- Reproductive technology
