= Skin electrode gel =

Gel used with medical skin electrodes

Skin electrode gels are used extensively to reduce electrical resistance when using skin surface electrodes, both for medical instrumentation such as EEG, EMG and EKG, and for electrical stimulation treatments such as TENS, electrotherapy, electroconvulsive therapy and defibrillation.

A typical electrode gel consists of a mixture of water, a thickener such as polyvinyl alcohol or carboxymethyl cellulose, and an electrolyte to increase conductivity.

Some electrode gels have been shown to pose a potential fire risk when high-energy pulses are used, as for example when defibrillators are used.

Skin electrode gels are also used by users of erotic electrostimulation to avoid skin burning.

== See also ==
- Medical lubricant
