= Fleshlight =

Brand of sex toys

- Logo of Fleshlight

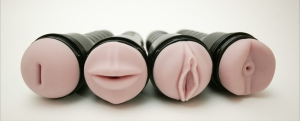
- Fleshlights in different sleeves
- Product type: Sex toys
- Current owner: Steve Shubin
- Produced by: Interactive Life Forms, LLC
- Country: United States
- Introduced: 1998; 28 years ago
- Related brands: Fleshlight Girls, Fleshjack, Fleshjack Boys
- Markets: Worldwide
- Registered as a trademark in: U.S. patent 5,782,818 and U.S. patent 5,807,360
- Website: fleshlight.com

The Fleshlight is a brand of artificial vagina, oral, or anal sex toy. It is a masturbatory aid, which is used by inserting the penis into its opening.

== Product history ==
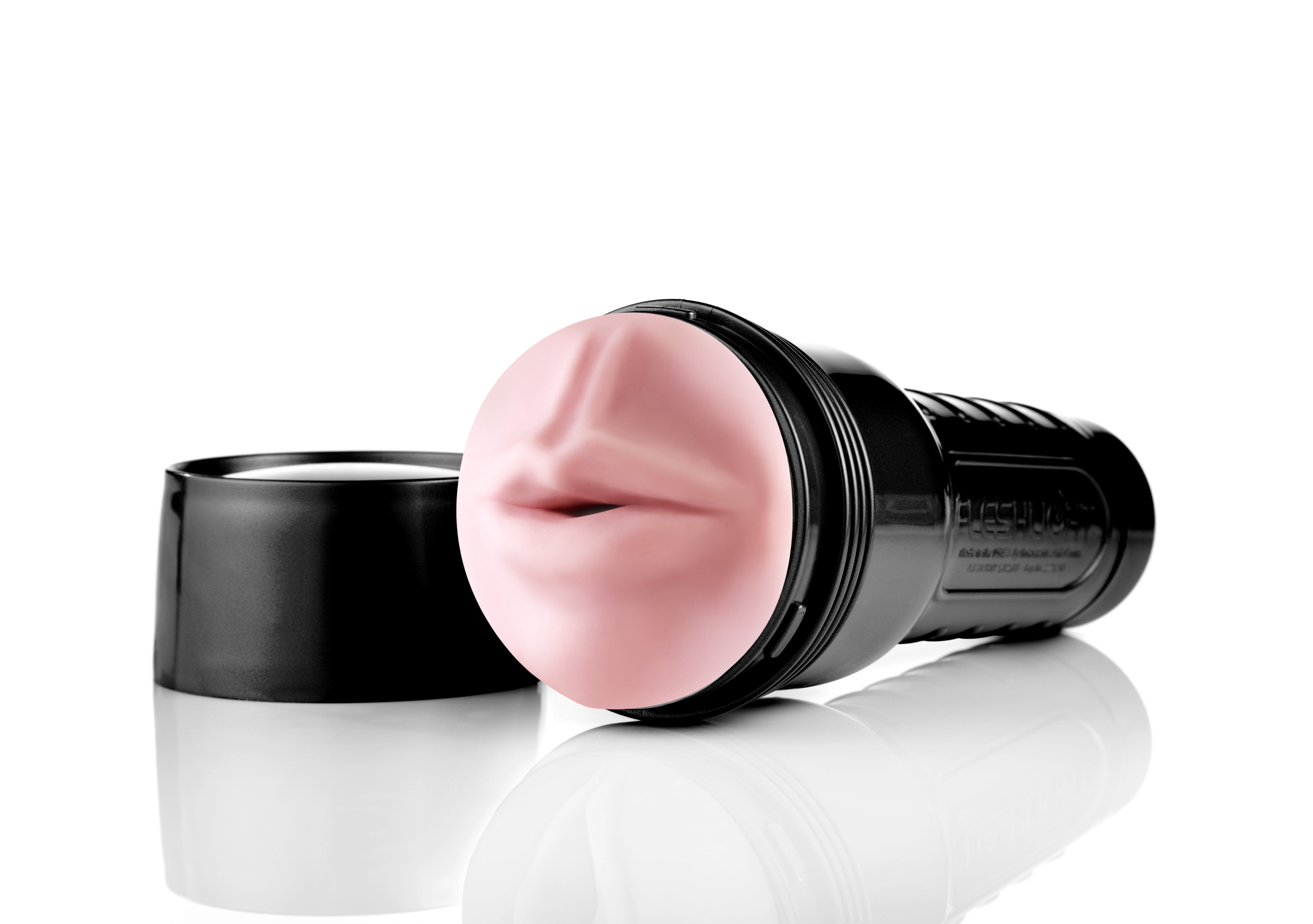
Side profile with cap open

The Fleshlight was designed by Steve Shubin, whose 1997 patent filing for a "device for discreet sperm collection" was granted in July 1998. Shubin was a linebacker on his college football team, then went to the police academy and worked on the SWAT team in Los Angeles County for about six years. Dissatisfied with the pay, he then ran his own power washing company in Los Angeles. In 1995, he filed a patent for a sex doll torso and eventually pivoted to the Fleshlight.

The Fleshlight is marketed by the Interactive Life Forms company, headquartered in Austin, Texas. The Fleshlight is named for the flesh-like material used in its inner sleeve, as well as the plastic case that houses the sleeve, which is fashioned to look like an oversized flashlight. The inner sleeve is available with a vulva, anus or mouth orifice, in colors representing a variety of skin tones as well as see-through, and 48 different internal textures. The exact material used is kept a secret.

In 2008, Wired reported that more than one million Fleshlights had been sold.

Alongside their classic collection, Fleshlight also introduced the 'Freak' and 'Alien' collections, which modelled Fleshlights on fantasy or sci-fi style designs that shied away from the conventional pornographic models traditionally used.

The Fleshlight Girls brand consists of masturbation sleeves molded from the bodies of pornographic actresses. A device called the Fleshjack is a spinoff marketed to gay men. The Fleshjack Boys and Fleshjack Guys brands consist of masturbation sleeves of anal mold and dildos molded from the bodies of gay pornographic actors.

In 2017, Fleshlight collaborated with Dutch sex-tech manufacturer KIIROO to develop Fleshlight Launch, an interactive device that was able to move a Fleshlight sleeve, whilst also syncing with adult entertainment or corresponding female toys.

In 2019 the Quickshot Launch was released.
