= Lube =

Lube may refer to:

- Lubricant, a substance (usually a liquid) introduced between two moving surfaces to reduce the friction and wear between
  - more specifically, in colloquial usage, personal lubricant

== Places ==
- Lube Parish, an administrative unit in Latvia
- Lubě, a municipality and village in the Czech Republic
- Lube, a village in the commune of Coslédaà-Lube-Boast in France

== Companies and organizations ==
- Lube Motorcycles, former Spanish motorcycle manufacturer, based in Bilbao
- Mr. Lube, Canadian chain of quick oil change garages
- Lubeh, a Russian band, sometimes romanized as Lube
- Volley Lube, an Italian volleyball club

== See also ==
- Lubricant (disambiguation)
