= K-Y Jelly =

Personal lubricant product

K-Y
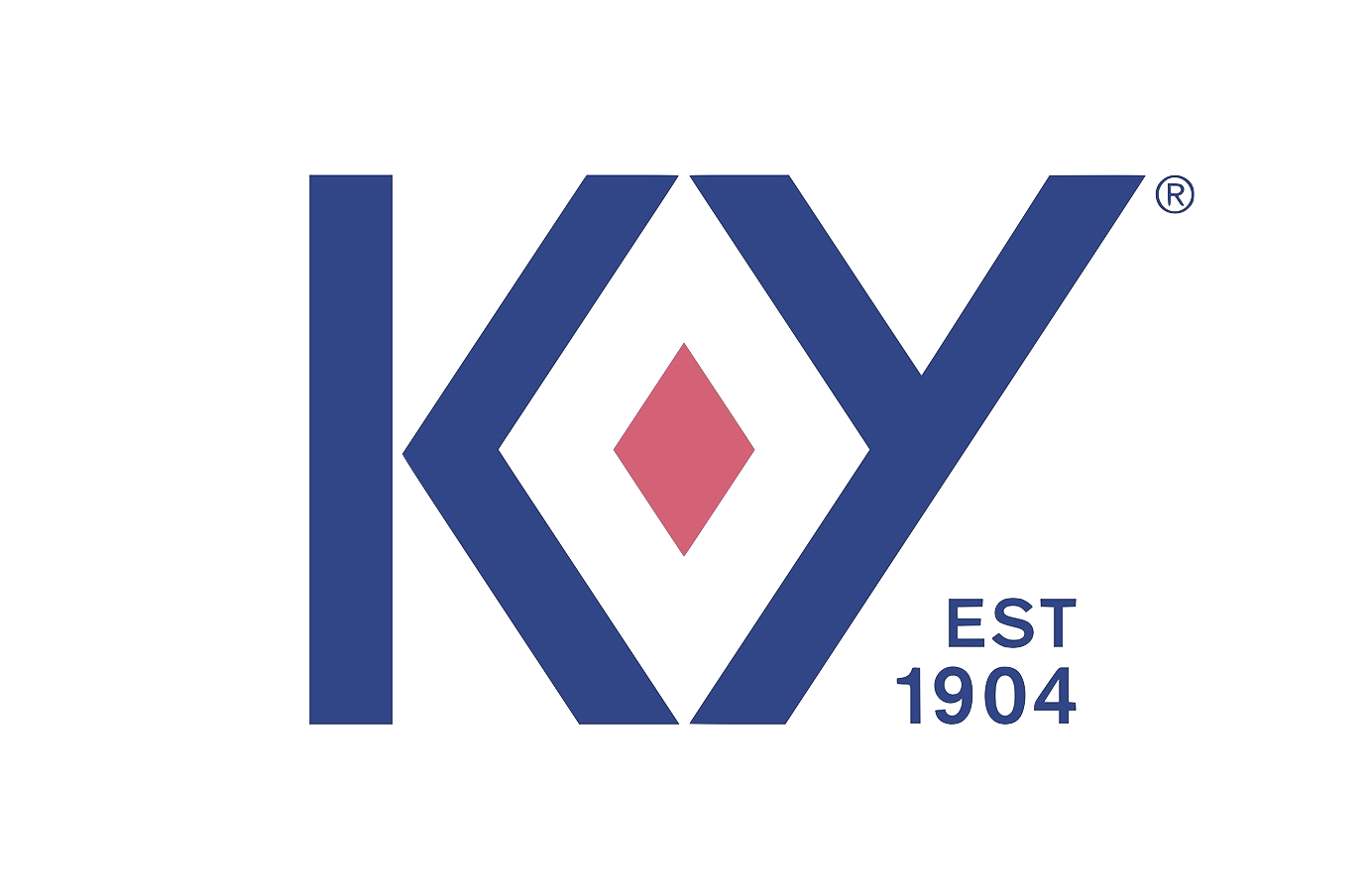
- Product type: Personal lubricant
- Current owner: Reckitt
- Country: United States
- Introduced: 1904; 122 years ago
- Previous owners: Van Horn and Sawtell; Johnson & Johnson
- Website: www.k-y.com

K-Y Jelly (sold as Knect in the United Kingdom) is a water-based, water-soluble personal lubricant, most commonly used as a lubricant for sexual intercourse and masturbation. A variety of different products and formulas are produced under the K-Y banner, some of which are not water-soluble.

== History ==
Introduced in 1904 by pharmaceutical company and suture manufacturer Van Horn and Sawtell of New York City, and later acquired by Johnson & Johnson, K-Y Jelly's original stated purpose was as a surgical lubricant, and it was often chosen by doctors because of its natural base. The origin and meaning of the "K-Y" brand name are unknown. The product is now more widely used as a personal lubricant to supplement the moisture required for performing sexual acts.

Reckitt Benckiser purchased the brand in 2014 and integrated the brand as the sub-brand of Durex. K-Y Jelly was rebranded as Knect in the United Kingdom in 2023.

== Properties ==
Unlike petroleum-based lubricants, K-Y jelly is biologically inert, reacting with neither latex condoms nor silicone-based sex toys, and contains no added colors or perfumes. It is non-staining and easy to clean up. Despite having a thick consistency and a tendency to dry out during use, it can be "reactivated" by the addition of water.

The product contains no spermicide and thus cannot be used to prevent pregnancy. A formulation containing nonoxynol-9 was removed from the market after the spermicide was found to facilitate the spread of HIV.

K-Y Jelly has been available over the counter in the United States since 1980.

== Composition ==
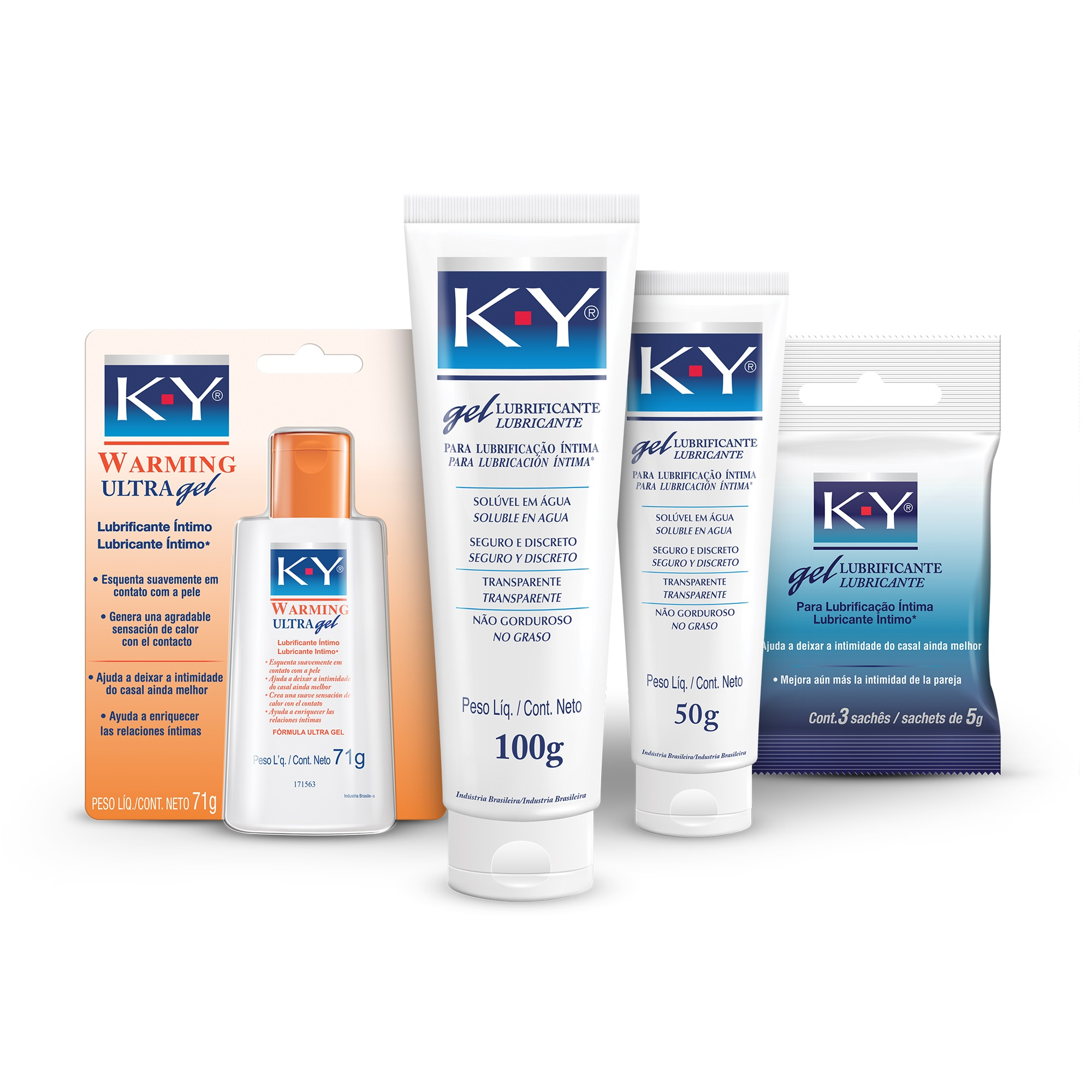
Various K-Y Jelly tubes

K-Y NG uses glycerin and hydroxyethyl cellulose as the lubricant, with chlorhexidine gluconate, glucono delta-lactone, methylparaben and sodium hydroxide as antiseptic and preservative additives. The liquid form of the product combines glycerin with propylene glycol, sorbitol, and Natrosol 250H (a brand of hydroxyethyl cellulose) for lubrication, with benzoic acid, methylparaben and sodium hydroxide as additives.

== Uses ==
=== Medical ===
In addition to its use as a personal lubricant, K-Y Jelly is employed by clinicians to perform prostate and gynecological examinations.

It is used by dentists to cover composite restorations when light curing. This prevents the oxygen inhibitation layer which causes marginal discolouration of restorations.

It has been noted as an alternative to conventional ultrasound coupling gel.

=== Other ===
It is also used by special effects technicians to create a "slimy" appearance or simulate saliva for animatronic monsters, most notably the Alien series, as well as being used alongside green glow stick liquid to create the blood of the Predators from the Predator franchise.
