= Tenga (company) =

Japanese adult toy manufacturer

Tenga Co., Ltd.
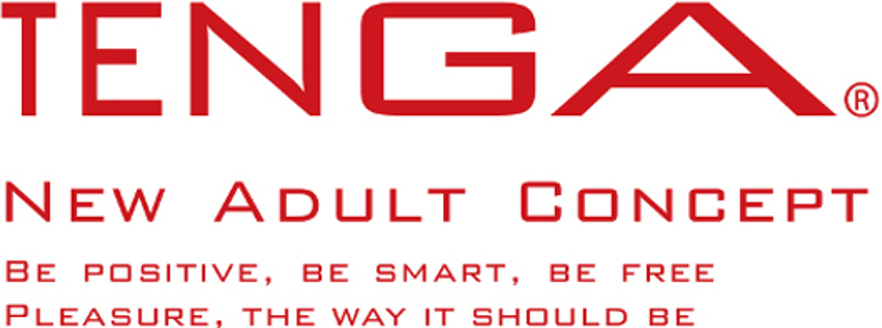
- Company type: Kabushiki gaisha, Close corporation
- Founded: 25 March 2005; 21 years ago
- Founder: Koichi Matsumoto
- Headquarters: Tokyo, Japan
- Area served: Japan and 41 other countries
- Products: Masturbators and related products
- Revenue: ▲JPY 2,200,000,000 (2012)
- Number of employees: 100
- Website: tenga.co Company Site

Tenga (Japanese: テンガ) is a Japanese brand of male masturbation aids by the company of the same name. Masturbation aids (masturbators), personal lubricants, and other related products are sold under this brand. The company's masturbators have been noted for their design aesthetics unexpected for a sex toy, and have received multiple industrial design awards.

== The company ==
Tenga Inc. (有限会社 典雅, Yūgen Gaisha Tenga) was established on March 25, 2005. The Tokyo-based company is headed by Koichi Matsumoto (松本光一), who used to be an auto mechanic. The first line of products (Tenga Cups) were released on July 7, 2005. Following the implementation of Companies Act in 2006, the company changed its type to kabushiki gaisha and continues its operation as Tenga Co., Ltd. (株式会社 典雅, Kabushiki Gaisha Tenga).

The word "tenga" (典雅) is a classical Japanese adjectival noun meaning "righteously arranged and elegant", typically used to praise the beauty of a kimono or buyō (Japanese dance). This name was chosen to counter the public image of adult goods, and with an aim to create high-quality products with new ideas.

As of 2011, 28 employees work in the company (including the board of directors), with 8 of them female. One of the directors is Masanobu Sato (佐藤雅信), who is responsible for the company's Overseas Business Department. Sato is a Masturbate-a-thon champion who achieved a world record for the "longest time spent masturbating/male" in 2008 (9 hours 33 minutes). In 2009, he extended his own record to 9 hours 58 minutes. He has been participating in the competitions using a set of Tenga masturbators of his own.

== Products ==
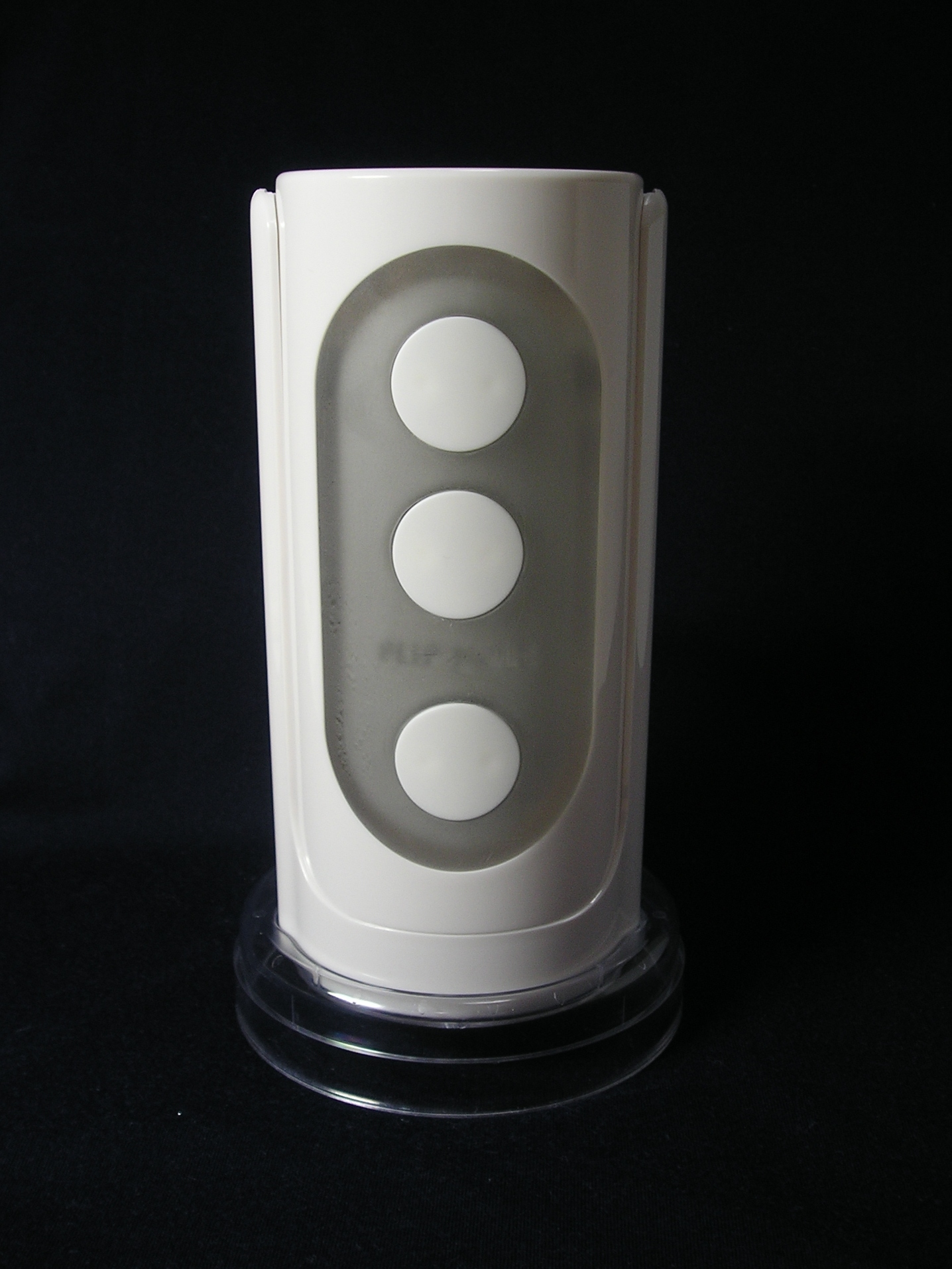
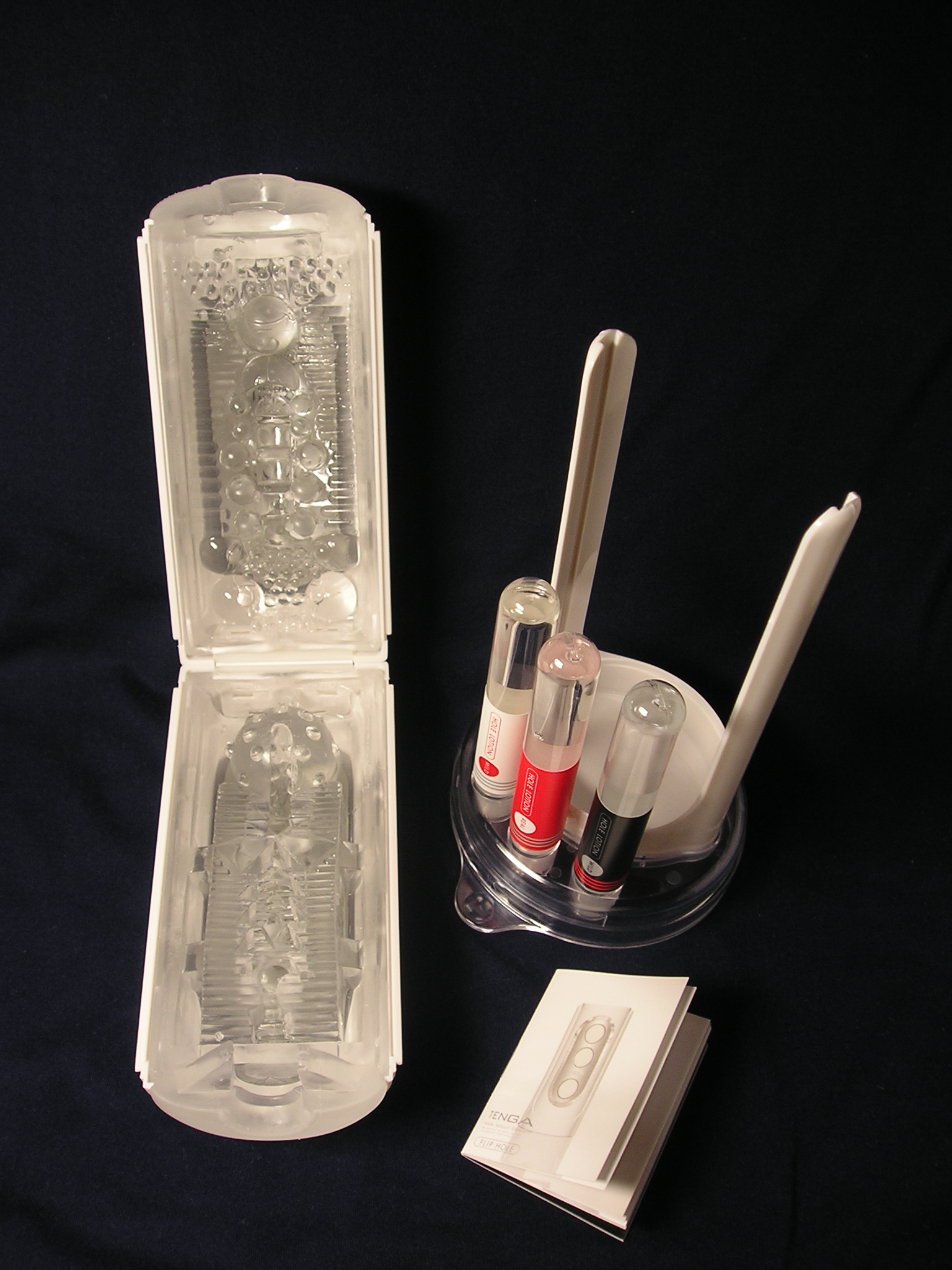
Flip Hole White is designed to be split open for maintenance as shown on the right photograph. The set includes a user's manual and three kinds of lotions.

Tenga offers several product categories. Disposable "Cup" series which are intended for one-time use only (which can be reused if washed correctly), "Flip" series that split open to be easily washable and reusable, compact "Egg" series which resemble Easter eggs and stretch when in use, and "Tenga 3D" series which are intended to be reversed when not in use, showing its geometric patterns. Other accessories include lotions (lubricants), electrical "Tenga Warmers", and "Hole Warmers" (a stick-shaped hand warmer that uses supersaturated sodium acetate).

=== Design and functionality ===
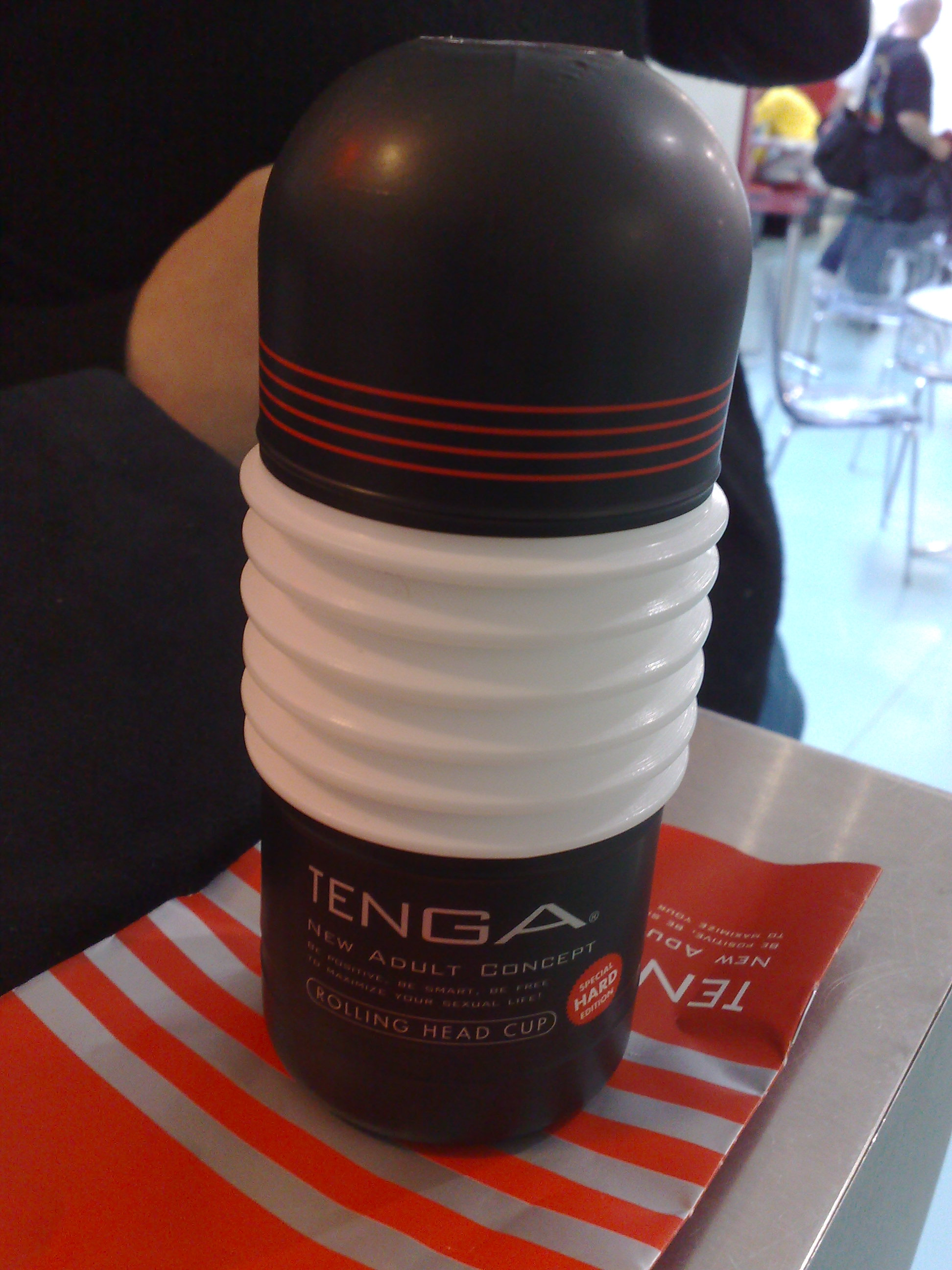
Rolling Head Cup (Hard), Black Tenga series, notable for unique movements possible by the white bellows as described in the text.

Tenga does not design their products as a replacement of human vagina. Erotic or sexual imagery are deliberately avoided in the product design and advertising. The products and their packaging are designed by a consumer goods stylist retained by Matsumoto. They typically feature solid colors of red, white, black, or gray, and have been described as "stylish" and as "Apple of the sex toy industry." The design reduces embarrassment for potential customers. One of their product "Rolling Head Cup" exemplifies the disconnection of the stimulatory function from appearance or simulation of ordinary sexual activity. The bellows in the middle allows for the top of the product to be swiveled around in a movement that is not analogous to sexual intercourse.

Due to its functionality, the product "Tenga Cup" is the most recommended product among 30 masturbation cups. Tenga Cups are equipped with a valve to control the internal pressure of the unit when inserted. A vacuum-like atmosphere can be created, which creates suction on the penis.

The interiors of Cups, Eggs and Flips are fabricated using elastomer; with the 3Ds using an Ag antibacterial form of that material.

=== Sales ===
In the lineup's first year (2005), 1 million units were sold. Since then, cumulative sales have reached 19 million units of masturbators sold worldwide (as of 2012). Japan accounts for about 80% of the sales, where 13,000 units are sold daily. Tenga is a relatively well-known brand in Japan for a masturbator, with its brand recognition rate exceeding 55% among males in their 20s, and approximately 47% among males in their 30s.

The remaining 20% of the sales are divided among 41 other countries, most prominently the United States, Spain, and China. Counterfeit products which resemble Tenga have been reported in China, ranging from products which only mimics the color and tone of the original package design to a product that is virtually indistinguishable from the original.

=== Range ===
==== Tenga Cup ====
Tenga's signature single-use disposable masturbation toy with vacuum suction functionality, shaped like a cup. It comes in several different varieties featuring different textures and levels of firmness.

==== Tenga Flip Hole ====
A reusable masturbation sleeve and case, which includes similar vacuum functionality to the disposable cups. It comes in four different colors; white, black, red and silver. Each color offers a different sensation with different inner sleeve lining. The flip hole uses a clamshell design with the intent to be easy to use and clean, including the ability to air dry after use. The Flip Hole can be used up to 50 times. Tenga also released a new version of the flip hole called Flip Air, however it was discontinued in spring 2012. They later introduced another successor called the Flip 0 (Zero), which uses more intricate internal textures and a different hinge mechanism for opening. The Flip 0 line includes the Flip 0 EV, which includes a pair of "vibrating cores" embedded in the elastomer for added stimulation.

==== Tenga 3D ====
The 3D range lies between the Tenga Cup and Tenga Flip Hole, both in product and price. It is a reusable sleeve available in five different textures/sensations. The sleeve can be turned inside out after use for easy cleaning and drying. Similar to the Flip Hole, the 3D can be used 50 times before disposing.

==== Tenga Egg ====
The Egg is an elastic egg-shaped masturbator. There are eighteen different textures and the eggs are designed to fit all sizes due to their elasticity. The cheapest of Tenga's product lines, like the cup it is designed as a single-use disposable toy.

==== VI-BO ====
Tenga's first attempt at a couples vibrator, the VI-BO is a vibrating orb that fits into 5 different 'covers'. Each cover features a different color and shape which allows use of the orb in various ways.

==== Iroha ====
On 3 March 2012, Tenga released a new brand named Iroha (イロハ), featuring a lineup of three vibrators designed for women. The products were endorsed by the former AV idol Nayuka Mine. As of early 2020, Iroha had expanded from its original product line to nine different ones, all of which are women's vibrators of some sort.

==== Tenga Spinner ====
The Spinner is masturbation sleeve with a coiled plastic spring embedded into the elastomer, which generates twisting motions during use.

==== Tenga Air-Tech ====
A toy line with a design heavily based on the original line of disposable cups, but it is re-usable due to its internal elastomer sleeve being thicker and more durable, and its outer shell allowing disassembly for cleaning. Its vacuum suction capability is also advertised as being stronger than the original cups. Unlike most Tenga products it is not exported to the American market, but it is available in Europe.

== Awards ==
The "Tenga 3D" series was awarded the Red Dot Award: Product Design 2012 in Germany. According to Tenga, this is the first time for a male masturbation aid to receive this award.

This was not the first time that Tenga was considered for an award in product designing. In 2006, Tenga passed the first round of screening for the Good Design Award by the Japan Industrial Design Promotion Organization, but was excluded before the beginning of the second screening due to it being determined as "ineligible" by the judging committee. The award did not give specific reasons why it was not eligible, but third-party writers have speculated that the sexual nature of the product was the reason for the exclusion. Matsumoto criticized the decision saying that Tenga is but a manufacturing company, and the decision "tramples the passions of manufacturing industries."

== Clinical usage ==
At least two independent groups in Japan have put Tenga products to clinical usage. Kobori et al. at Dokkyo Medical University have applied Tenga for ejaculatory dysfunction studies. Imai et al. at Seirei Hamamatsu General Hospital have used Tenga on a number of patients suffering from intravaginal anejaculation or post-prostatectomy dysfunction.

In their paper, Kobori et al. gave the following reasons why they chose to utilize Tenga for their purposes:

- They are in widespread use and can be bought in general variety stores or bookshops
- They enable a constant grip pressure to be maintained
- The lineup offers three different standard levels of stimulation (hard, standard, soft), enabling support for various cases
- They are disposable and hygienic
- They do not have decorative imitations that resemble human vagina, and their designs are suitable for medical use
- The manufacturer and the distributor are well-known

== Comic adaptation ==
In 2008, comic artist Butcha U (ブッチャーU, bucchā yū) drew a picture depicting the masturbators as fictional girls (a form of moe anthropomorphism). The concept was given the Hōsai Tsuruoka Award (鶴岡法斎賞) from Japan Otaku Awards 2008 (日本オタク大賞2008). Tenga Co., Ltd. gave permission to make this concept into a commercial project; and in 2010, the concept was expanded into an electronic comic series titled Tengirls, published by Sony Digital Entertainment Services Inc. (a subsidiary of Sony). The story features a team of girls resembling the Tenga products, who fight against crimes and disasters that occur in a near-future city.

== Data breach ==
A February 2026 email to customers stated that “an unauthorized party gained access to the professional email account of one of our employees,” sending spam emails to the affected employee's contacts and potentially obtaining access to customer names, email addresses, order details, and service inquiries.
