= JoGayle Howard =

American zoologist

JoGayle Dillon Howard
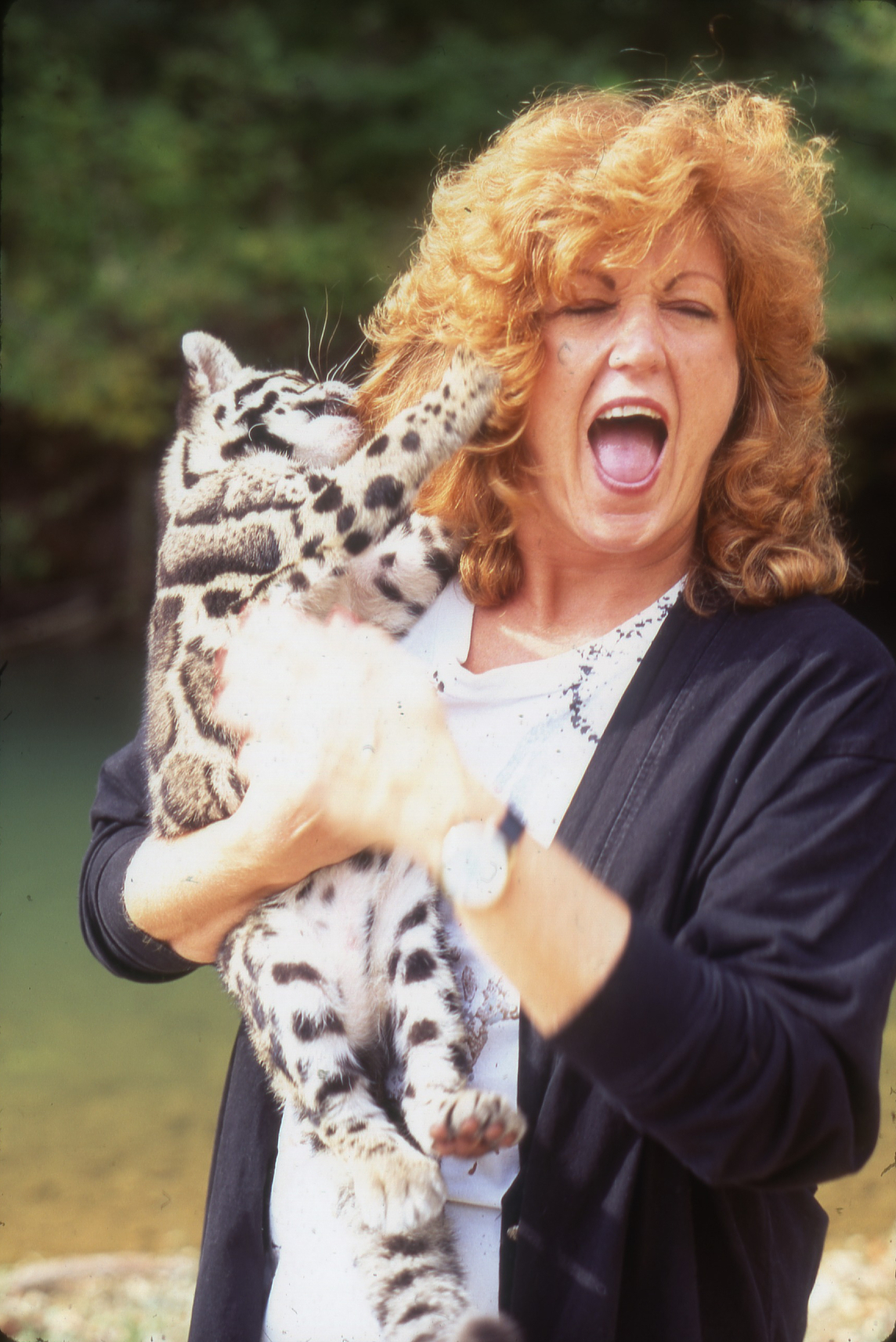
- JoGayle Howard with a clouded leopard cub born via artificial insemination, 1992, Smithsonian Institution Archives, SIA2017-023033
- Born: May 20, 1951; Dallas, Texas, U.S.
- Died: March 5, 2011 (aged 59); Washington, D.C., U.S.
- Education: Sunset High School, Dallas, TX. Class of 1969; Texas A&M University, Veterinary Science, 1980; University of Maryland, doctorate, 1989
- Known for: Successfully bred critically endangered black-footed ferret; survey of giant pandas in China from 1998 through 2000.
- Awards: 2010 U.S. Fish & Wildlife Service "Recovery Champion"
- Scientific career
- Fields: Veterinary science, zoology, reproductive biology
- Workplaces: Smithsonian Conservation Biology Institute

JoGayle Dillon Howard (May 20, 1951 – March 5, 2011) was an American zoologist and theriogenologist specializing in the captive breeding of endangered species such as pandas, clouded leopards, and black-footed ferrets.

== Biography ==
Howard was born on May 20, 1951, in Dallas, Texas. She graduated with a doctorate in veterinary medicine from Texas A&M in 1980. She earned a PhD in reproductive physiology from University of Maryland in 1989.

Originally a veterinarian, Howard later became an expert in animal breeding, receiving the nickname "Sperm Queen"." She used common human infertility treatments, like artificial insemination and In vitro fertilisation, and was a pioneer in electroejaculation techniques.

In 1980, she began working at the Smithsonian Conservation Biology Institute in Washington, D.C. She oversaw the black-footed ferret breeding program at The National Zoo. With her aid more than 500 kits were born and 150 artificial inseminations were performed.

In 1992, alongside the Nashville Zoo President Rick Schwartz, she conducted the first successful clouded leopard artificial insemination. "If we lose this species," Howard says of the clouded leopards, "that means we probably lose other species in the forest. We may lose the forest all together. It may affect the human race eventually. I think most people want to just see these animals and want their future generations to see these animals. They are unique and nothing's going to replace a clouded leopard.""

From 1998 to 2000, Howard surveyed giant pandas in China. This study helped identify the causes of poor reproduction, which led to a rise in the population of giant pandas in breeding centers and zoos over the next ten years. "I'm not an emotional person," she once told a reporter. "But it's pretty cool when you realize you're putting these animals back where they should be."

Howard oversaw the project to artificially inseminate the National Zoo's female panda, Mei Xiang, and produced the first surviving cub, Tai Shan, in 2005.

She died from cancer on March 5, 2011, in Washington D.C.

== Awards and recognitions ==
- Research Career Award (SERCA) from the National Institutes of Health
- Ulysses S. Seal Conservation Award from the American Association of Zoo Veterinarians
- Distinguished Research and Scientist Award from the American Association of Zoo Veterinarians
- Recovery Champion Award from the U.S. Fish & Wildlife Service
- Member of the American Society of Andrology; served as a member of the executive council (1993–1996)
- Vice-president, Women in Andrology Committee (1999–2000)
- President, Women in Andrology Committee (2000–2001)
- Howard delivered the Buckeye Lecture in 1997
- Research Achievement (US Fish & Wildlife Service)
- Featured Conservation Scientist (British Airways Exhibit at Millennium Dome, London)

== Publications ==
- Giant Pandas: Biology and Conservation
- Recovery of the Black-footed Ferret
- "Do Ranger Stations Deter Poaching Activity in National Parks in Thailand?"
