= Vibroejaculation =

Semen collection technique

Vibroejaculation (or penile vibratory stimulation) is a means of inducing ejaculation through vibration. It is used for semen collection, and in humans, the management of anejaculation.

One method of penile vibratory stimulation is the use of specialised devices that are placed around the glans penis to stimulate it by vibration. Alternatively, a powerful wand vibrator of the type used as sex toys can be used.

== See also ==
- Electroejaculation
