= Artificial vagina =

Device designed to imitate the female sex organs

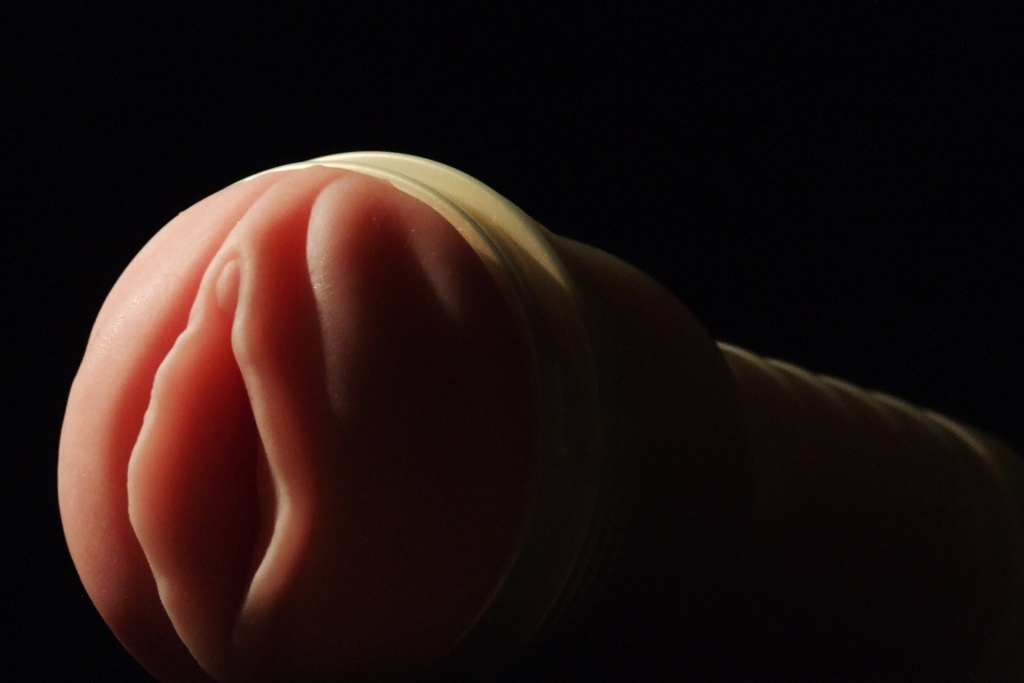
A fleshlight designed to resemble a vagina/vulva

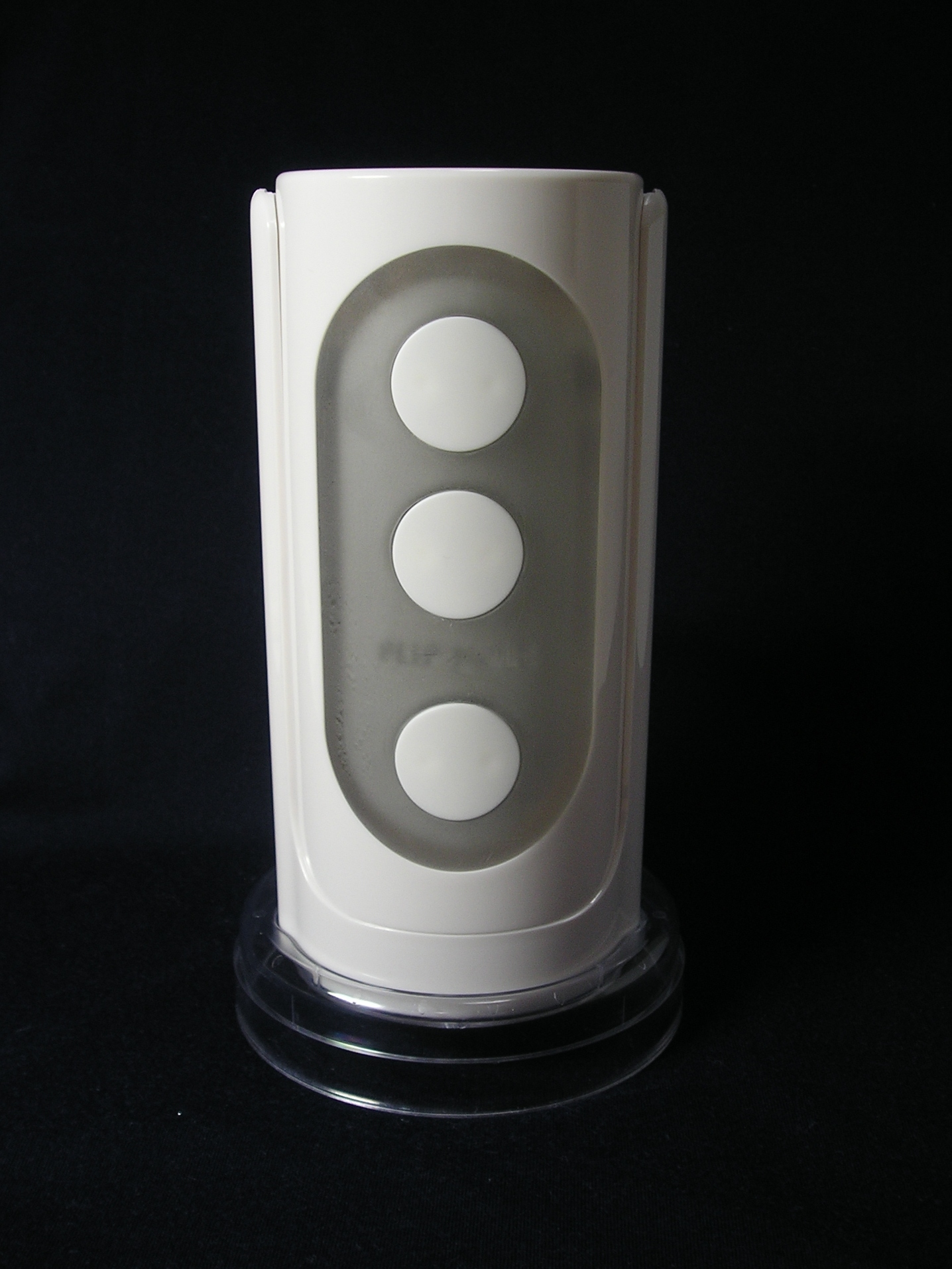
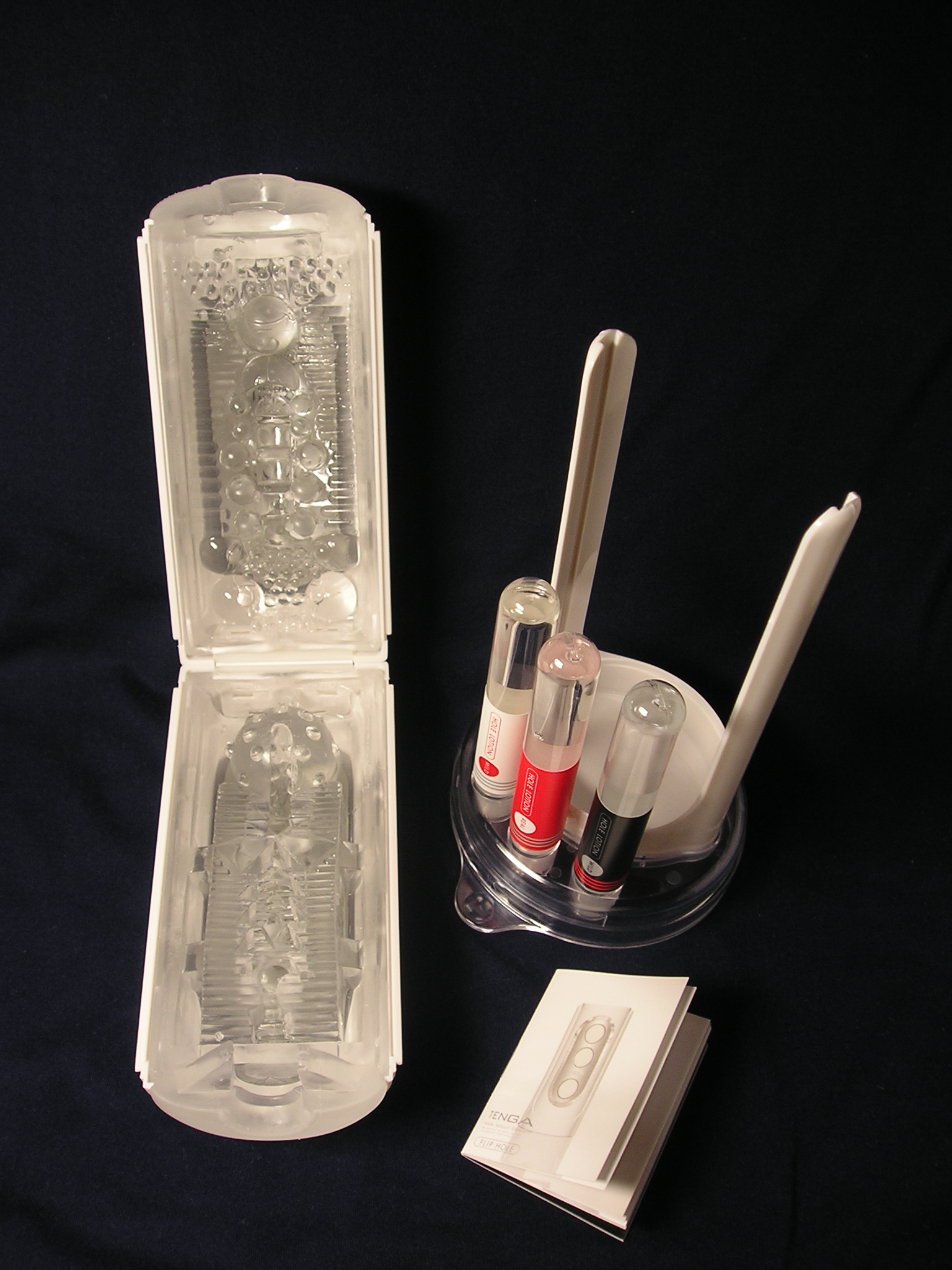
Tenga Flip Hole White is designed to be split open for maintenance, as shown in the right photograph. The set includes a user's manual and three kinds of lotions.

An artificial vagina is a device designed to imitate the vagina as well as sometimes the vulva. To achieve this, it will generally be made of a soft material, lubricated, and occasionally heated.

There are different types of artificial vaginas. They may be designed for medical research purposes, animal breeding, or as a sex toy for erotic stimulation. Strokers and sleeves are sex toys usually designed as a handheld way to simulate a sex act, while an artificial vagina installed in a sex doll can be used hands-free.

== Veterinary use ==
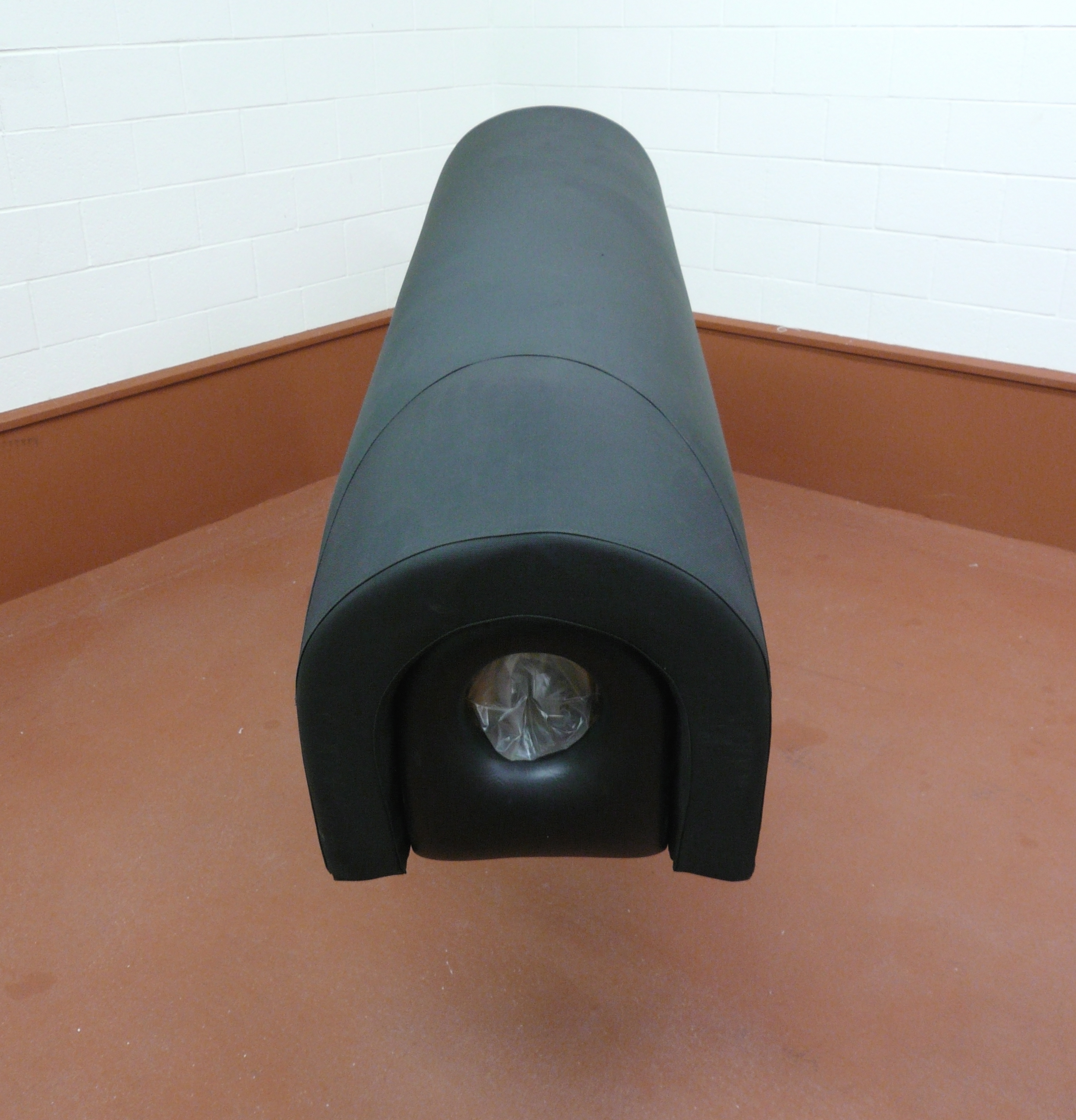
A breeding mount with a built-in artificial vagina used to collect semen from horses for use in artificial insemination

Artificial vaginas are widely used by farms in cattle artificial insemination programs and semen collection centers for collecting animal sperm and its further application. An artificial vagina designed for collecting semen will imitate some or all of the anatomical features and behaviors of an animal's vagina.

There are several types of collecting apparatus, but the general design uses a tube with a normally sterile inner liner and a hard outer shell. The walls of the tube may be hollow and filled with warm water to mimic a natural body temperature for better results, and may contain a filter to separate the semen.

== Human use ==
An artificial vagina, stroker, masturbation aid, masturbator, or pocket pussy is designed to enhance masturbation by simulating the sensation of sexual intercourse on the erect penis to induce orgasm and ejaculation.

Usually, the artificial vagina has a realistic or near-realistic appearance with a sleeve into which the penis can be inserted. The sleeve, sometimes called a "vaginal tunnel", measures on average 10 to 20 centimetres (4 to 8 inches) and may have an open end for inserting a vibrating bullet if desired.

=== Types ===
==== Realistic ====
This type of artificial vagina is modelled on female genitals. For marketing purposes, many manufacturers design the vagina like an exact replica of some famous pornographic actress' vulvas. Realistic vaginas are made to simulate the natural physiology: pubic bones, hair, labia, all natural creases, dimples, and wetness, etc.

The artificial vagina is currently the most researched male sex toy type in the United States and Europe. The popularity of this sex toy has increased dramatically and is now competing with the industry's most popular sex toy types that include dildos and vibrators.

These masturbators also come in many shapes and styles for many purposes; such as mouths for oral sex, as well as the several realistic vaginas that are manufactured with a narrower anal orifice (or anus) for those users who also like to simulate anal sex. The natural vagina has a series of ridges called rugae, and manufacturers often add nubs or ribs into artificial vaginas to simulate the rugae and enhance pleasure.

In Japan, artificial vaginas are known as onaholes. They often feature more varied designs than their Western counterparts, come in various sizes, and often feature packaging with anime and hentai-themed art. Onacups are popular disposable artificial vaginas that simulate various sex acts and come with lubricant already inside.

==== Vibrating ====
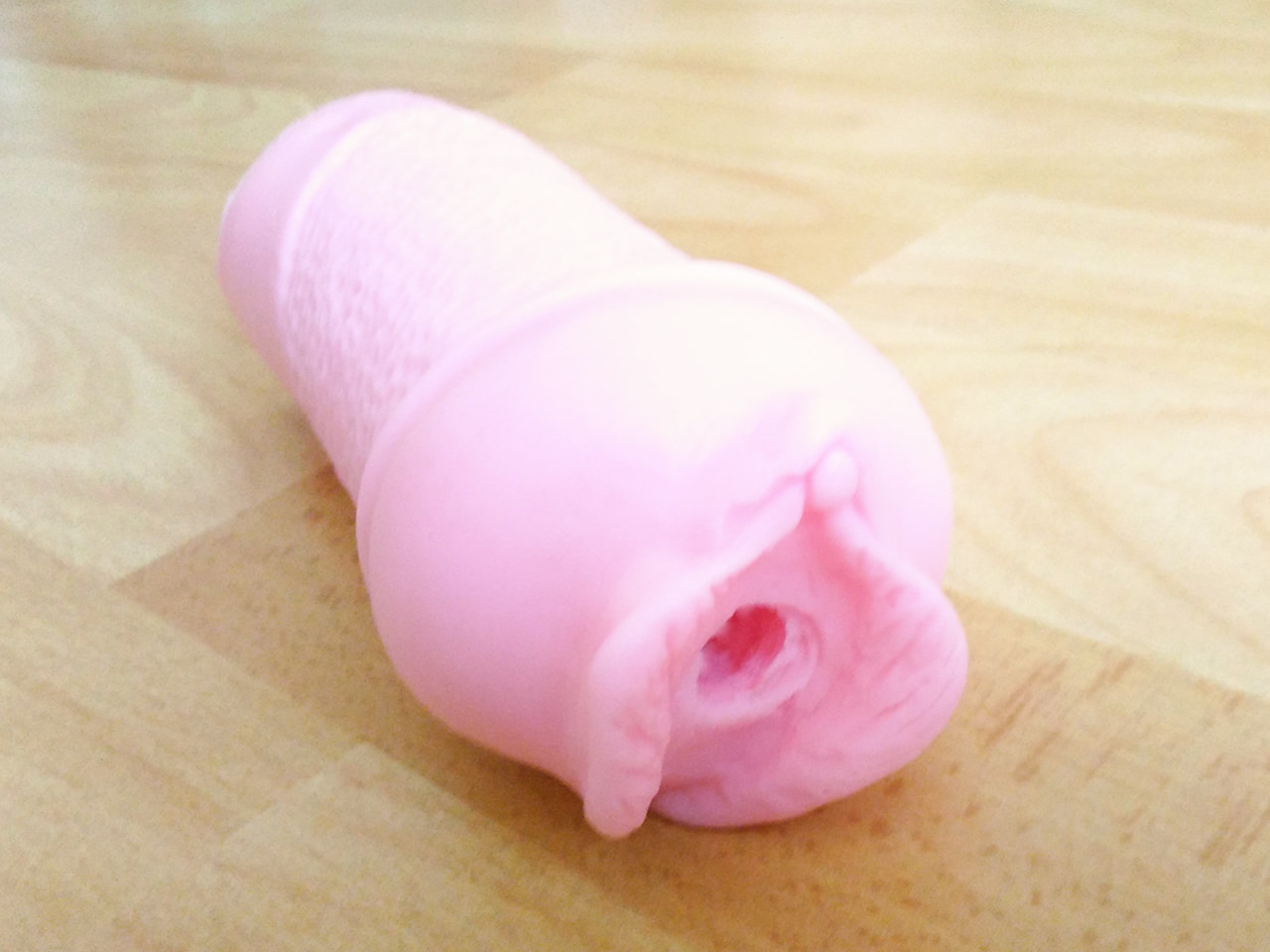
Artificial vagina

These artificial vaginas superficially resemble the previous one, but they have the added feature of a vibrating element — usually a removable vibrating bullet that can be easily inserted into a hole in the bottom or the end of the sleeve. For more intensive sensations, there are a variety of functions: vibrating, pulsating, surging, rotating, multi-speed, etc. Vibrating bullets are usually controlled by a panel connected by a wire. Some kinds of vibrating artificial vagina are designed effect, replicating the role of a penis pump—with a bulb squeezed by the user. Some vibrators incorporate Bluetooth technology for remote operation and media synchronization, with Lovense among the manufacturers.

==== Strokers ====
Strokers are generally more discreet than other masturbators. The inside of a stroker features a textured canal that stimulates the penis while the outside is often ridged to ensure a good grip during use. Some automatic strokers are powered by electric motors to simulate the sensations of sexual movements.

==== Improvised ====
In prison slang, a "fifi" refers to an artificial vagina usually made by rolling a trash bag or condom inside of a towel, and using a lubricant, e.g: hand lotion. These are also referred to as "fifi towels" or "fifi bags".

=== Materials ===
The artificial vagina as a sex toy is designed from materials that imitate the feel of natural skin. The materials used in manufacturing artificial vaginas are stretchable and elastic to accommodate different penis sizes.

- Cyberskin, Ultra realistic or Futurotic (mixture of PVC and silicone) and some other patented materials – natural-feeling materials that are quite porous, therefore requiring special care before and after use.
- Plants (fruits and vegetables) – hollow cucumbers, banana skins, papayas and other produce are widely available, low cost, and have a flesh-like texture.
- Rubber (elastic hydrocarbon polymer) – a flexible and resilient material with high durability. The porous rubber makes it difficult to clean.
- Soft plastics (Poly vinyl chloride) – popular material for sex toys that has a jelly-like feel, though it has a plasticizer odor.
- Latex (natural rubber derived from plants) – flexible material that may cause allergic reactions in some individuals.
- TPE (Thermoplastic elastomers) – Most common and can be used to make dolls more cheaply than silicone.

The above materials are all porous and therefore require special care and cleaning to avoid bacterial accumulation. Manufacturers recommend protecting them by applying a condom during use. This is less of a concern with artificial vaginas made from silicone, which, while generally more expensive, is non-porous and can be disinfected after cleaning with a bleach solution or heat.

=== Medical usage ===
Masturbators are sometimes used for medical research. For example, Kobori et al. at Dokkyo Medical University have applied a Japanese onacup for ejaculatory dysfunction studies.

== See also ==
- Dildo
- Fleshlight
- Sex doll
- Tenga (masturbation toy)
- Venus 2000
