= Electroejaculation =

Procedure in human and veterinary medicine

Electroejaculation is a procedure used to obtain semen samples from sexually mature male mammals. The procedure is used for breeding programs and research purposes in various species, as well as in the treatment of ejaculatory dysfunction in human males. This procedure is used frequently with large mammals, particularly bulls and some domestic animals, as well as humans who have certain types of anejaculation. Electroejaculation has also been used for the cryoconservation of animal genetic resources, where semen is stored in low temperatures with the intent of conserving genetic material and future revival.

In the practice of veterinary medicine and animal science, it is common to collect semen from domestic ruminants using electro-ejaculation without sedation or anesthesia. Only in goats is mild sedation sometimes used. Because of the significant skeletal muscle contractions it causes, electroejaculation is not used in stallions — except in rare cases, under general anesthesia.

In humans, electroejaculation is usually carried out under a general anesthetic. An electric probe is inserted into the rectum adjacent to the prostate gland. The probe delivers an AC voltage, usually 12–24 volts sine wave at a frequency of 60 Hz, with a current limited to usually 500 mA, although some devices can generate currents of up to 1 A. The probe is activated for 1–2 seconds, referred to as a stimulus cycle. Ejaculation usually occurs after 2–3 stimulus cycles. Care must be taken when using currents greater than 500 mA, as tissue burns may result due to heating of the probe. The electric current stimulates nearby nerves, resulting in contraction of the pelvic muscles and ejaculation.

== Variant names ==
- Rectal electroejaculation (REE)
- Trans-rectal electro-ejaculation (TREE)

== Application to endangered species conservation ==
The procedure has been adopted and modified as an assisted reproduction technique for managing endangered species, to ensure the production of offspring from incompatible pairs of animals where artificial insemination is feasible.

== Other uses ==
Electroejaculation may also be used for posthumous sperm retrieval in "brain-dead" humans.

== See also ==
- Artificial vagina#Veterinary use
- Cryoconservation of animal genetic resources
- Erotic electrostimulation
- Frozen bovine semen#How semen is collected
- Horse breeding
- Semen collection
- Vibroejaculation
- JoGayle Howard, pioneer in animal electroejaculation techniques
