= Personal lubricant =

Substance to reduce friction, usually during sexual acts

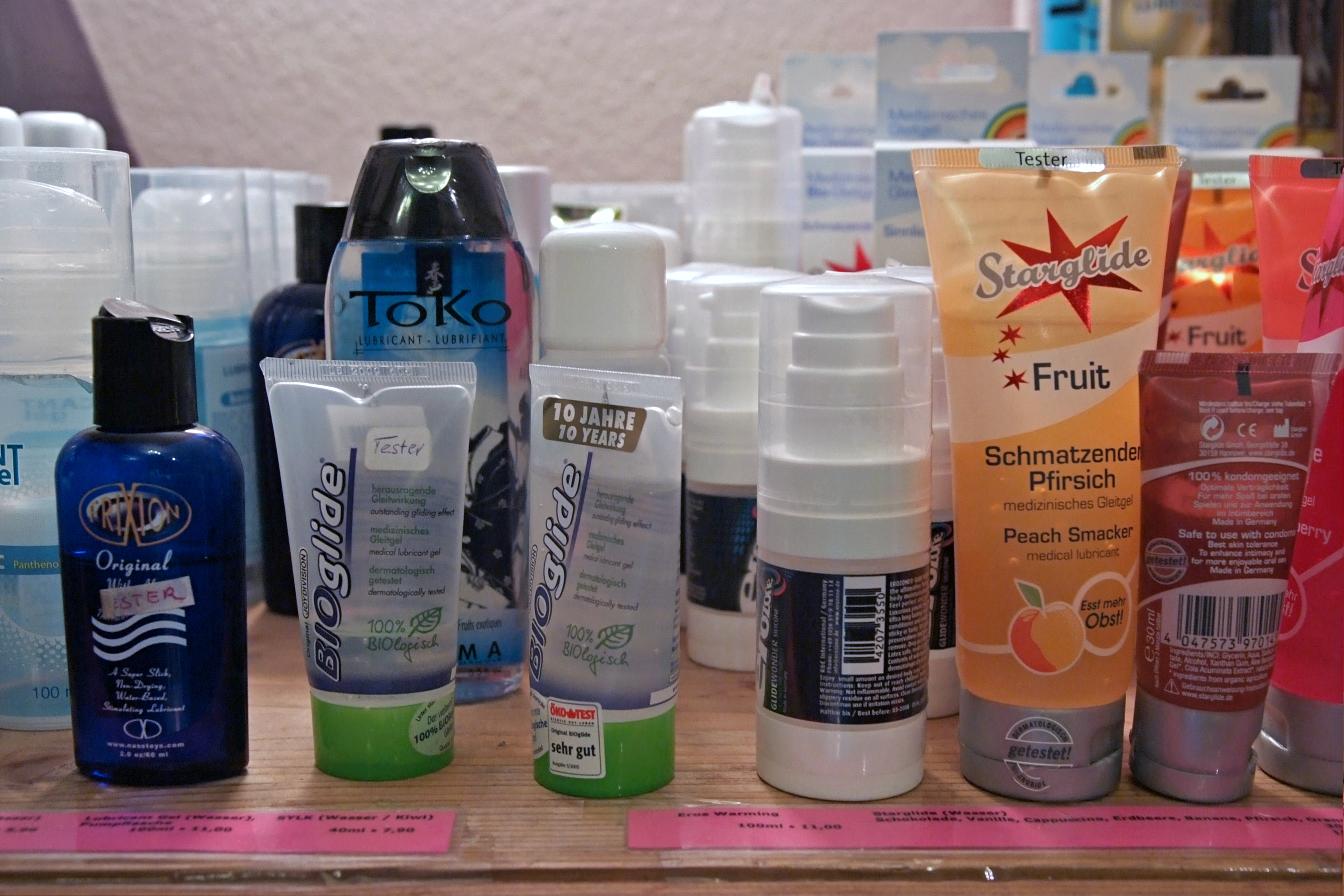
Variety of personal lubricants

Personal lubricants (colloquially termed lube) are specialized lubricants used during sexual acts in order to reduce friction, ease penetration, and increase pleasure. It can be applied to the penis, vagina, anus, or other body parts, as well as sex toys.

Personal lubricants are different from surgical or medical lubricants, which are similar but are expressly approved for medical use (such as speculum or catheter insertion), with the primary difference being that surgical lubricants are thicker, sterile gels that typically contain a bacteriostatic agent.

== Types ==
=== By composition ===
==== Water-based ====
Water-based personal lubricants have water-based formulas, are water-soluble, and are the most popular type of personal lubricants as of 2025. The earliest water-based lubricants were composed of cellulose ether or glycerin solutions. Modern water-based lubes may have various agents added for even dispersal, moisture retention, and resistance to contamination. The viscosity of these products can be altered by adjusting their water content and concentration of cellulose or other gel-forming hydrophilic ingredient.

Because water-based personal lubricants absorb into the skin and evaporate, most water-based lubricants have a tendency to dry out during use, but reapplying lubricant or applying water is usually sufficient to reactivate them. When the lubricant eventually dries out, its other ingredients and agents may leave behind a residue, which can be removed with water.

Typical water-based lubricants may be (and are recommended for) use in safer sex, as their water-based chemical composition do not damage latex or other polymer-based condoms. However, these same lubes may be incompatible with sexual acts occurring in water (such as in a pool or shower), as their water-solubility means they can easily dissolve and fail to lubricate.

In a 2011 study, the Population Council tested commercially available water-based sexual lubricants and found that many of the lubricants damaged human rectal cells, with lubes specifically containing polyquaternium-15 appearing to actively increase HIV replication in cell cultures, theoretically increasing risk of HIV transmission. However, researchers concluded that "[s]ince it is the condom that is protecting users from HIV rather than the lube, condom users should still be encouraged to use water-based lubes” due to a higher risk of condoms breaking when no lube is used. The researchers also cited silicone-based lubricants as a potential alternative, although they did not test any silicone lubes in their study.

A later study published by PLOS One in 2012 validated the findings of the Population Council study for the hyper-osmolality of some water-based products to cause damage to some human cells, and better bio-compatibility with low-osmolality water-based products and silicone-based products. However, the study failed to corroborate polyquaternium-15 having a role in the binding of HIV to rectal cells or increases in HIV replication.

==== Oil-based ====
Oil-based lubricants are based on petroleum or plant oils, and includes petroleum jelly & lotions. Oil-based lubes are generally considered incompatible with latex condoms, as the oils weaken latex and can increase the likelihood of breakage or slipping. Oil-based lubricants may therefore be considered desirable for people who are in relationships not requiring condom use, use it for external stimulation, or for use in sexual acts under water.

==== Silicone-based ====
Silicone-based lubricants have a silicone polymer-based formula. Silicone-based lubricants are not absorbed by skin or mucous membranes, and consequently last longer on the skin than water-based lubricants. Silicone-based lubricants are considered safe for use with all types of condoms, though they are generally recognized to damage other silicone-based objects such as sex toys as it dissolves the surface, making it sticky to the touch and causing disintegration of the item over time. Silicone-based lubes have also been shown to perform better that many water-based lubes at mitigating risk of HIV transmission during anal intercourse.

Silicone-based lubricant are the most common type of lube used in the manufacture of pre-lubricated condoms, due to its latex compatibility and increased shelf life.

=== By usage ===
==== Vaginal lubricants ====
Vaginal lubricants are used to augment vaginal lubrication and reduce vaginal dryness and pain during intercourse, and by couples trying to conceive. During fertility interventions, the use of a lubricant eases sperm specimen collection by masturbation. The most commercially available vaginal lubricants are water or hydroxyethylcellulose-based.

Human saliva and olive oil have been found to be detrimental to sperm function. Certain commonly used commercial lubricants, although labeled as non-spermicidal or spermicidal agent-free, have been found to impair sperm function, with several of these lubricants being as toxic to sperm in vitro as contraceptive gels. Sperm motility and viability were found to be disrupted shortly after direct contact between sperm and those lubricants or in saliva. Sperm function could be compromised following lubricant contact, due to the specific ingredients in the lubricant or due to the chemical properties of the lubricant, such as highly raised osmolarity or low pH. Such lubricants are therefore unsafe for use during fertility procedures such as semen collection or by couples trying to conceive by natural or assisted reproduction.

Vaginal lubricants such as mineral oil, canola oil, or hydroxyethylcellulose-based lubricants are recommended for use by couples attempting conception by The Practice Committee of the American Society for Reproductive Medicine.

==== Anal-specific lubricants ====
Many lubricants are safe for anal sex, however there are also lubricant products specifically marketed or designed to enhance enjoyment of anal sex. These lubes are often a thicker gel version of existing lubricants, as the consistency is preferable for keeping it stictioned onto the anus.

Some anal lubricants contain numbing agents to relieve discomfort during anal sex although their use is generally inadvisable, due to the lack of sensation making accidental injury more likely and risk of accidentally numbing another part of the body. Additionally, a common agent in these types of lubes is benzocaine, which can cause an allergic reaction in those with an allergy to PABA (4-aminobenzoic acid). As such, many of these products have been pulled from the market due to FDA Medical Device Requirements.

=== Organic or natural ===
In the United States, personal lubricants are considered Class II medical devices, but can receive organic certifications through the US Department of Agriculture’s National Organic Program. The first USDA-certified organic personal lubricant was Applied Organics’ Nude Personal Lubricant in 2004. Many lubricants also market themselves as "natural" and do not contain parabens, glycerin, diethanolamine (DEA) or animal-based ingredients. Some contain botanicals such as aloe vera or plant extracts.

=== Specialty and novelty lubricants ===
Warming lubricants contain specific ingredients to cause a sensation of warmth. Breathing on these types of lubricants may increase the effect. "Cooling" or "tingling" lubricants may contain ingredients such as peppermint. Some lubricants are sold together, such as "hot and cold", or are marketed for a specific use or effect. Flavored lubricants contain flavorings, such as fruit flavors, to enhance oral contact. "Edible" lubricants may be flavored and/or may not contain any ingredients that are not advisable to eat.

=== Non-classified lubricants ===
Other products, fluids, or solutions have historically been used as personal lubricants in lieu of dedicated lube. Plant oils, such as coconut oil and vegetable shortening, are considered durable and inexpensive but damaging to latex. Other substitutions for lubricants include saliva and mineral oil.

== Uses ==
=== Sexual activity ===
A personal lubricant can be used to increase pleasure and reduce pain during sexual intercourse or other activities and may be used for lubricating the vulva, especially the clitoral glans, the vagina, the penis, the anus, stroker, dildo or other sex toys before or during activity. Lubricant may be applied to any body part desired, to the inside and/or outside of condoms, or to the hands or fingers. Personal lubricants are particularly useful for sexual foreplay and intercourse when a partner experiences dryness or excessive contraction (tightness) of the vagina or anus. Anal sex generally requires more generous application of lubricant since the anus does not have natural lubrication sufficient for most sexual activity.

==== Masturbation ====
While most males and females produce varying amounts of their own lubrication, extra lubrication is sometimes sought when needed. There are specific lubricants which may be used in male masturbation, often called "masturbation creams", but are not suitable for vaginal or anal use or for use with condoms. Many men in Japan use lubricant created specifically for onaholes such as the Tenga Egg. Lubricant that is safe for sexual intercourse is also safe for masturbation.

Hand lotion is often used for recreational masturbation, and popularly seen as an alternative to lubricants created specifically for sexual intercourse.

=== Medicine ===
Enema nozzles and rectal thermometer tips should be lubricated before use to minimize friction while inserting through the tightly retentive anal sphincter.

Personal lubricants can help treat erectile dysfunction in older men.

== Risks ==
As of December 2012, the U.S. Food & Drug Administration does not typically require testing of personal lubricants in humans. The agency classifies them as medical devices, so testing occurs on animals such as rabbits and guinea pigs. Rectal use of lubricants is viewed by the agency as an off-label application. In 2012 it was reported that participants who consistently used personal lubricants for rectal intercourse had a higher prevalence of sexually transmitted infections (STI), such as chlamydia, than inconsistent users. Some warming lubricants have been shown to have an osmolality count more than 30 times the body's own fluid. Increased herpes transmission was more than ninefold when compared with animals not administered lubricant. In 2007 it was demonstrated that certain lubricants can cause significant damage to the rectal tissue of human study participants – major shedding of cells was observed from tissue samples biopsied 60 to 90 minutes after lubricant application. Certain lubricants containing the ingredient chlorhexidine, an antibacterial agent, has been shown to kill three species of Lactobacillus and has been shown to unbalance the natural flora in the vagina, which might lead to infections such as bacterial vaginosis. Lubricants with osmolalities closer to that of the body, such as agar-based lubes, did not damage the tissue samples or boost HIV infection rates.

Some may experience irritation from the use of certain lubricants. Some lubricants (as mentioned above under Water-based) have been found to damage cells or even increase the replication of the HIV virus. Nonoxynol-9, a spermicide contained in some lubricants, can destroy vaginal and rectum cell membranes which may increase the rate of STI transmission. Spermicidally lubricated condoms do not contain enough spermicide to increase contraceptive effectiveness, but application of separate spermicide is thought to reduce pregnancy rates significantly.

== See also ==
- Vaginal lubrication
