= Posthumous sperm retrieval =

Extraction of spermatozoa from a legally dead person

Posthumous sperm retrieval (PSR) is a procedure in which spermatozoa are collected from the testes of a human corpse after brain death. There has been significant debate over the ethics and legality of the procedure, and on the legal rights of the child and surviving parent if the gametes are used for impregnation.

Cases of post-mortem conception have occurred ever since human artificial insemination techniques were devised, via sperm donation to a sperm bank after the death of the donor. While religious objections have been made even under these circumstances, far more censure has arisen regarding invasive retrieval from fresh cadavers or patients either on life support or in a persistent vegetative state, particularly when the procedure is carried out without explicit consent from the donor.

== Cases ==
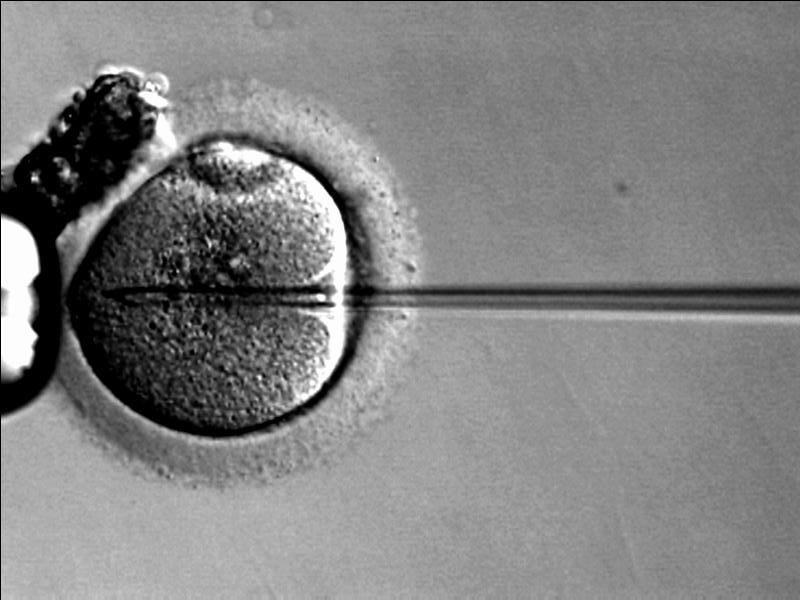
Intracytoplasmic sperm injection, the most common method of fertilization using posthumously extracted sperm.

The first successful retrieval of sperm from a cadaver was performed by the California Cryobank in 1980, in a case involving a 30-year-old man who became brain dead following a motor vehicle accident and whose family requested sperm preservation. The first successful conception using sperm retrieved post-mortem was reported in 1998, leading to a successful birth the following year. Since 1980, a number of requests for the procedure have been made, with around one third approved and performed. Gametes have been extracted through a variety of means, including removal of the epididymis, irrigation or aspiration of the vas deferens, and rectal probe electroejaculation. Since the procedure is rarely performed, studies on the efficacy of the various methods have been fairly limited in scope.

While medical literature recommends that extraction take place no later than 24 hours after death, motile sperm has been successfully obtained as late as 36 hours after death, generally regardless of the cause of death or method of extraction. Up to this limit, the procedure has a high success rate, with sperm retrieved in nearly 100% of cases, and motile sperm in 80–90%. There is currently little precedent for successful insemination using sperm harvested after 36 hours. New technologies are being researched that could make this a routine reality, in turn creating new ethical dilemmas. Retrievals up to 72 hours after death are said to be possible.

If the sperm is viable, fertilisation is generally achieved through intracytoplasmic sperm injection, a form of in vitro fertilisation. The success rate of in vitro fertilisation remains unchanged regardless of whether the sperm was retrieved from a living or dead donor.

A marginal procedure for years, the number of retrievals has recently increased in Israel, aided by permissive legislation since the 2000s and a number of high-profile cases of young men dying in armed conflict. From the Hamas attacks on Israel in October 2023 up to July 2024, the sperm of 170 young men has been retrieved, according to the Israel ministry of health, about 15 times the number for the same period in previous years.

== Legality ==
The legality of posthumous sperm extraction varies from jurisdiction to jurisdiction. Generally, legislation falls into one of three camps: a full ban, a requirement of written consent from the donor, or implied consent obtained from the family.

=== Areas with full bans ===
Following the 1984 Parpalaix case in France, in which the widow of deceased cancer patient Alain Parpalaix obtained permission from the courts to be inseminated with her husband's spermatozoa after his death, the Centre d’Etude et de Conservation du Sperme Humain (Center for the Study and Preservation of Human Sperm) petitioned the courts successfully for a full ban on posthumous insemination, in line with the country's ban on in vitro fertilisation for post-menopausal women.

Similar legislation exists in Germany, Sweden, Taiwan and the Australian states of Victoria and Western Australia.

=== Areas requiring written consent ===
Guidelines outlining the legal use of posthumously extracted gametes in the United Kingdom were laid out in the Human Fertilisation and Embryology Act 1990. The Act dictates that explicit written consent by the donor must be provided to the Human Fertilisation and Embryology Authority in order for extraction and fertilisation to take place. Following the 1997 case of Regina v. Human Fertilisation and Embryology Authority, the terms of the Act were extended to comatose patients, and so theoretically assault charges could be (but in this case were not) brought against doctors for overseeing or performing the procedure.

There are few other jurisdictions that fall into this category. New York senator Roy M. Goodman proposed a bill in 1997 requiring written consent by the donor in 1998, but it was never passed into law.

Also in Spain it is necessary to have a signed consent from the deceased person and the wife can only use the sample in a period of 12 months.

=== Areas requiring implied consent ===
In 2003, Israeli Attorney General Elyakim Rubinstein published several guidelines outlining the legal situation of posthumous sperm retrieval for the purpose of later insemination by a surviving female partner. The guidelines specified firstly that only requests by a partner (married or otherwise) of the deceased would be honoured – requests by other members of the donor's family would be denied. While extraction of the sperm was guaranteed following a request by the partner, permission to use the sperm was to be determined case by case, a court of law deciding on the basis of the effect on the presumed wishes of the donor, and the effect of the procedure on the donor's dignity. If it could be demonstrated that the deceased took definite steps towards parenthood (implied consent), use of extracted sperm by the female partner would generally be permitted.

There has been, however, an increasing number of cases in Israel in which women who had not been in a relationship with the deceased, volunteered and were allowed to carry their child, often following a public call-up by the deceased's parents. The first such case concerned an IDF soldier shot in the Gaza Strip in 2002, with a further landmark case in 2007. The mothers have to be willing to raise the children, though. In 2017, a court in Lod denied the parents of a deceased IDF soldier the right to have a surrogate mother carry his child. Rules have somewhat relaxed following the 2023 Hamas attack on Israel. Retrieval has become easier (even being promoted as an option by the IDF) but the deceased's wish for children still has to be demonstrated in court. Jewish religious law frames the conflict primarily as one between the principle of burying the body whole (i.e. not retrieving anything from it after death) and continuing a man's lineage. There is also debate whether the children thus conceived should have access to the same benefits as other IDF soldiers killed in service.

=== No legislation ===
Many other countries, including Belgium and the United States, have no specific legislation regarding the rights of people on gamete donation following their death, leaving the decision in the hands of individual clinics and hospitals. As such, many medical institutions in such countries institute in-house policies regarding circumstances in which the procedure would be performed.

== Ethics ==
Several ethical issues surround the extraction and use of gametes from cadavers or patients in a persistent vegetative state. The ones most often debated concern religion, consent, and the rights of the surviving partner and child if the procedure results in a birth.

Some major religions prohibit posthumous sperm retrieval, including Roman Catholicism and Judaism. Roman Catholicism proscribes the procedure on much the same grounds as in vitro fertilisation, namely the rights of the unborn. Judaic strictures are based on the halakhic prohibition on deriving personal benefit from a corpse, and in the case of those in a persistent vegetative state, their categorisation as gosses (dying person) prohibits anyone from touching or moving them for anything that does not relate to their immediate care.

Consent of the donor is a further ethical barrier. Even in jurisdictions where explicit or implicit consent is not required, there are occasions in which clinicians have refused to perform the procedure on these grounds. If no proof of consent by the donor can be produced, implied consent, often in the form of prior actions, must be evident for clinicians to proceed with the extraction. Sperm retrieval is rarely carried out if there is evidence that the deceased clearly objected to the procedure prior to his death.

Finally, if the procedure is performed and results in a birth, there are several issues involving the legal rights of the child and its mother. Because posthumous insemination can take place months or even years after the father's death, it can in some cases be difficult to prove the paternity of the child. As such, inheritance and even the legal rights of the child to marry (due to the possibility of consanguinity between partners) can be affected. For this reason, several countries, including Israel and the United Kingdom, impose a maximum term for the use of extracted sperm, after which the father will not be legally recognised on the child's birth certificate.

== See also ==
- Posthumous birth
- Sperm theft
- Osiris myth
