= Anejaculation =

Pathological inability to ejaculate in males

Anejaculation is the pathological inability to ejaculate despite an erection in males, with (orgasmic) or without (anorgasmic) orgasm.

== Causes ==
The following table shows the frequency of ability to ejaculate by type of spinal cord injury and stimulation method.
	Masturbation or coitus	Penile vibratory stimulation	AchE inhibitor
Complete spinal cord injury	12%	47%	55%
Incomplete spinal cord injury	33%	53%	78%
Complete lesion of the sympathetic centres (T12 to L2)		None	5%
Complete lesion of the parasympathetic and somatic centres (S2 – S4)		None	31%
Complete lesion of all spinal ejaculation centres (T12 to S5)		None	0%
Complete lesion strictly above Onuf's nucleus (S2 – S4)		98%	98%
Complete lesion of the S2 – S4 segments		none	none

It can depend on one or more of several causes, including:

- Sexual inhibition
- Pharmacological inhibition. They include mostly antidepressant and antipsychotic medication, and the patients experiencing that tend to quit them
- Autonomic nervous system malfunction
- Prostatectomy - surgical removal of the prostate.
- Ejaculatory duct obstruction
- Spinal cord injury causes sexual dysfunction including anejaculation. The rate of being able to ejaculate varies with the type of lesion, as detailed in the table at right.
- Old age
- Diabetes mellitus

Anejaculation, especially the orgasmic variant, is usually indistinguishable from retrograde ejaculation. However, a negative urinalysis measuring no abnormal presence of spermatozoa in the urine will eliminate a retrograde ejaculation diagnosis. Thus, if the affected person has the sensations and involuntary muscle-contractions of an orgasm but no or very low-volume semen, ejaculatory duct obstruction is another possible underlying pathology of anejaculation.

== Management ==
=== Anejaculation in spinal cord injury ===
The first-line method for sperm retrieval in men with spinal cord injury is penile vibratory stimulation (PVS). The penile vibratory stimulator is a plier-like device that is placed around the glans penis to stimulate it by vibration. In case of failure with PVS, spermatozoa are sometimes collected by electroejaculation, or surgically by percutaneous epididymal sperm aspiration (PESA) or testicular sperm extraction (TESE).
