= Percutaneous epididymal sperm aspiration =

Medical technique for semen analysis

Percutaneous epididymal sperm aspiration (PESA) is a technique used to determine sperm counts in the event of a possible blockage of the vas deferens. It is an alternative to microepidydimal sperm aspiration (MESA), and aims to address the technical difficulty and cost of MESA. A small needle is inserted through the skin of the scrotum to collect sperm from the epididymis, where sperm are usually stored after production in the testes. It can also be used to extract sperm for intracytoplasmic sperm injection (ICSI).
