= Surgical lubricant =

Lubricant used for medical procedures

Surgical lubricants, or medical lubricants, are substances used by health care providers to provide lubrication and lessen discomfort to the patient during certain medical and surgical procedures such as urethral catheterisation, cystoscopy, vaginal or rectal examinations. Some examples of surgical compatible lubricants are:

- Surgilube is a surgical lubricant made of natural water-soluble gums that also contains the antiseptic chlorhexidine gluconate.
- K-Y Jelly was initially used as a surgical lubricant before it gained popularity as a personal lubricant.
- Lidocaine gel with local anaesthetic effect reduces procedure pain beyond what is achieved with water-based lubricant and is used in for example catheterisation and cataract surgery.
- Medicinal castor oil was the original vegetable-based surgical lubricant.

Indications for medical lubricants include Sjögren syndrome, specifically for treating vaginal dryness, dyspareunia (painful sexual intercourse) and vulvodynia (vaginal pain).
