= Semen collection =

Process of obtaining semen from male animals

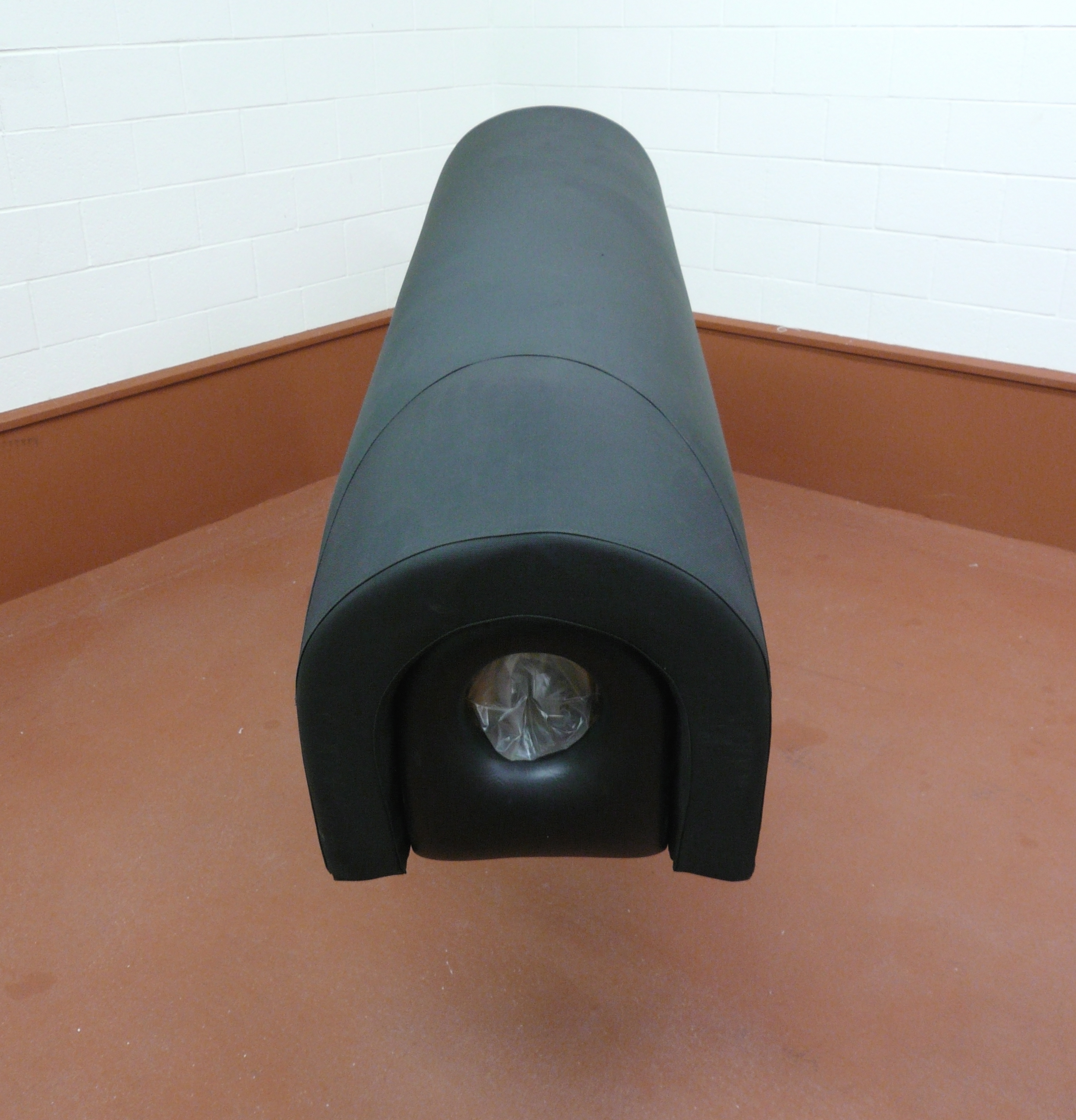
A breeding mount with built-in artificial vagina used to collect semen from horses for use in artificial insemination

Semen collection refers to the process of obtaining semen from human males or other animals with the use of various methods, for the purposes of artificial insemination, or medical study (usually in fertility clinics). Semen can be collected via masturbation (e. g., from stallions and canids), prostate massage, artificial vagina, penile vibratory stimulation (vibroejaculation) and electroejaculation. Semen can be collected from endangered species for cryopreservation of genetic resources.

== By species ==
=== Humans ===
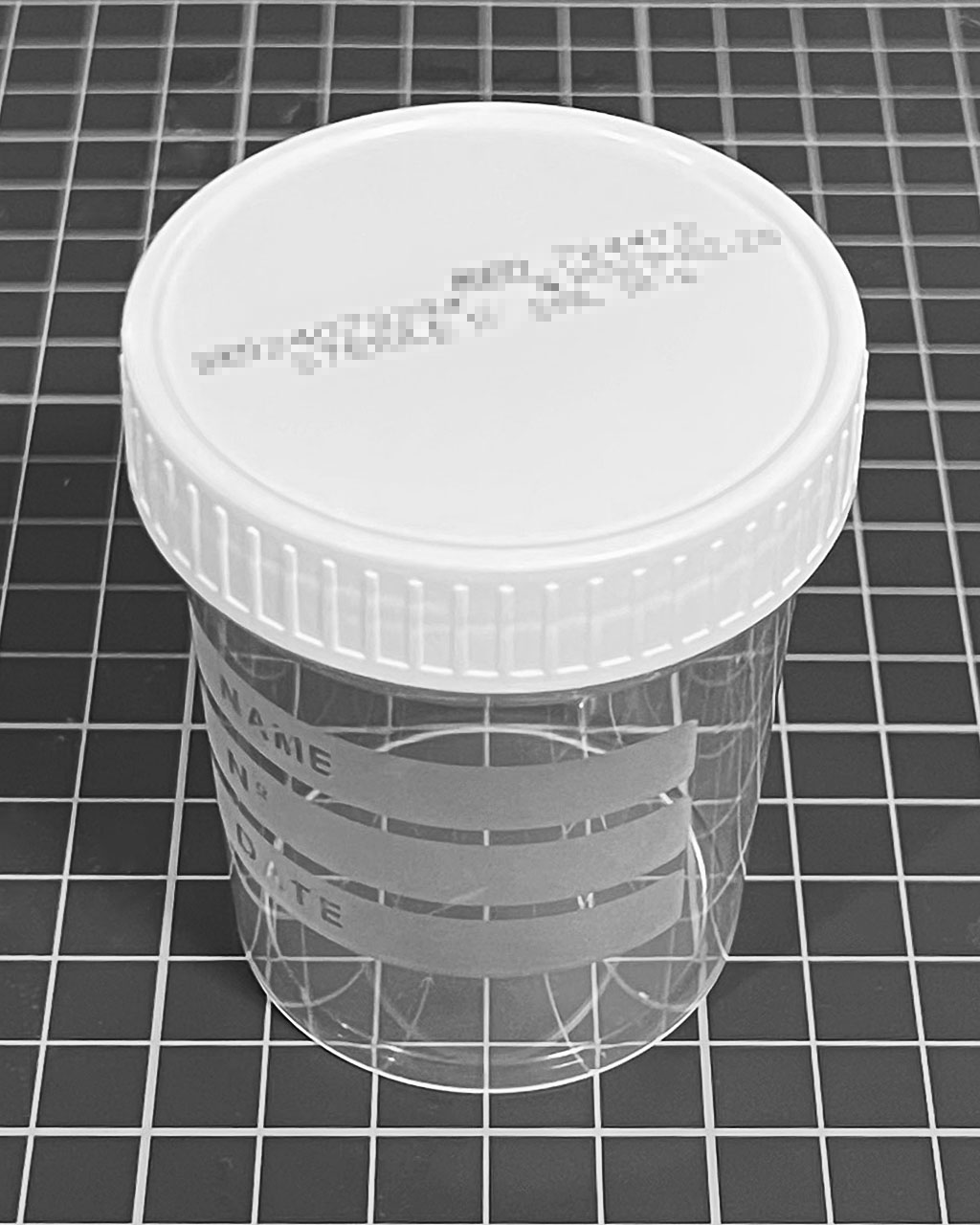
Semen collection cup for fertility treatment

Methods of semen collection from humans include:

- Masturbation, directing the sample into a clean cup. This is the most common way to collect a semen sample.
- Sexual intercourse using a special type of condom known as a collection condom. Collection condoms are made from silicone or polyurethane, as latex is somewhat harmful to sperm. Many men prefer collection condoms to masturbation, and some religions prohibit masturbation entirely. Adherents of religions that prohibit contraception may use collection condoms with holes pricked in them. However, such samples are inferior to the ones collected by masturbation in clean cup.
- Coitus interruptus (withdrawal). With this technique, the man removes his penis from the vagina near the end of intercourse and ejaculates into a wide-necked cup or bottle. If an analysis of semen quality is required, this technique is generally not recommended as part of the ejaculation could be lost which decreases the accuracy of the results.
- Surgical extraction, if for example a blockage in the vas deferens is suspected to impede fertility, semen can be taken directly from the epididymis. Such a collection is called percutaneous epididymal sperm aspiration (PESA). Alternatively, the testicular tissue itself, instead of the sperm produced can be investigated. Then, the collecting method is called testicular sperm extraction (TESE). A Cochrane review found insufficient evidence to recommend any specific surgical sperm retrieval technique for men with azoospermia undergoing intracytoplasmic sperm injection (ICSI).
- Penile vibratory stimulation (PVS) and electroejaculation are two other alternatives for men with anejaculation due to spinal cord injury. The penile vibratory stimulator is a plier-like device that is placed around the glans penis to stimulate it by vibration, and provides the first-line method for sperm retrieval in spinal cord injury patients with anejaculation.

The best specimen is produced when a short period of 3–5 days of abstinence is observed. A more prolonged period does not yield better results.

=== Cattle ===
The process of bovine semen collection is vital in the agricultural industry as it allows farmers to improve the genetics of their herds and increase the efficiency of their breeding programs.

=== Horses ===
For semen collection from stallions, the most common method used is an artificial vagina; after collecting semen, it is tested, diluted, then stored according to the intended use. Semen can be either liquid or frozen. There are many kinds of preservatives used in dilution with semen - most contain energy and antibiotics for liquid, and protection from freezing for frozen semen. Many studies are ongoing to improve preservation, increase liquid semen storage time, and reduce or remove bacteria from semen.

=== Canids ===
==== Dogs ====
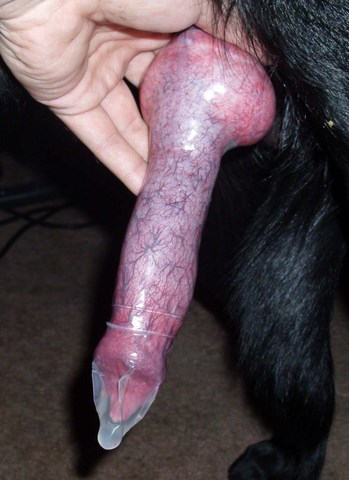
Dog sperm collection

In order to collect semen from a male dog, an artificial vagina is prepared, which is a conical thin latex sleeve ending in a sterile collection tube. The inside of the latex sleeve is lightly lubricated. The male is allowed to sniff a female in estrus. Experienced studs cooperate readily in the process. New studs often require encouragement in the form of manual stimulation, also known as "manual ejaculation". Generally the male will mount the female, and the collector quickly directs the dog's penis into the latex sleeve. The male ejaculates and the semen is collected in the tube. The semen is then drawn up into a long thin pipette. Prior to ejaculation, the penis is massaged inside its sheath. It is then extruded from its sheath, and the collector massages the dog's erect penis near the base of the bulbus glandis using the thumb and index finger. The dog begins pelvic thrusting movements at the onset of ejaculation.

==== Wolves ====
Semen can be collected from wolves via manual stimulation or electroejaculation.

== See also ==
- Canine reproduction#Procedure
- Conception device#Semen collectors
- Collection condom
- Cryoconservation of animal genetic resources#Semen
- Posthumous sperm retrieval
- Semen analysis
- Sperm theft

== Bibliography ==
- I. Gordon (2004). Reproductive technologies in farm animals [electronic resource]. CABI. pp. 62–. ISBN 978-0-85199-049-1.
- Wilson G. Pond; Alan W. Bell (2005). Encyclopedia of Animal Science. Marcel Dekker. pp. 130–. ISBN 978-0-8247-5496-9.
- Deborah Reeder; Sheri Miller; DeeAnn Wilfong; Midge Leitch; Dana Zimmel (30 July 2012). AAEVT's Equine Manual for Veterinary Technicians. John Wiley & Sons. ISBN 978-1-118-50482-6.
- Graham Munroe BVSc (Hons) PhD Cert EO DESM Dip ECVS FRCVS; Scott Weese DVM DVSc DipACVIM (15 March 2011). Equine Clinical Medicine, Surgery and Reproduction. Manson Publishing. pp. 334–. ISBN 978-1-84076-608-0.
- Juan C. Samper (2009). Equine Breeding Management and Artificial Insemination. Elsevier Health Sciences. pp. 38–. ISBN 978-1-4160-5234-0.
- Steven P. Brinsko; Terry L. Blanchard; Dickson D. Varner; James Schumacher; Charles C. Love (19 May 2010). Manual of Equine Reproduction. Elsevier Health Sciences. pp. 547–. ISBN 978-0-323-06513-9.
- Schmitt, D. L., and T. B. Hildebrandt. "Manual collection and characterization of semen from Asian elephants (Elephas maximus)." Animal reproduction science 53.1 (1998): 309–314.
- Brown, Janine L., et al. "Successful artificial insemination of an Asian elephant at the National Zoological Park." Zoo Biology 23.1 (2004): 45–63.
- Howard, JoGayle, et al. "Electroejaculation, semen characteristics and serum testosterone concentrations of free-ranging African elephants (Loxodonta africana)." Journal of reproduction and fertility 72.1 (1984): 187-195.

=== Semen collection from rhinoceroses ===
- Cave, A. J. E. "THE PROCESSÜS GLANDIS IN THE RHINOCEROTIDAE." Proceedings of the Zoological Society of London. Vol. 143. No. 4. Blackwell Publishing Ltd, 1964.
- Schaffer, Nan, et al. "Ultrasonographic monitoring of artificially stimulated ejaculation in three rhinoceros species (Ceratotherium simum, Diceros bicornis, Rhinoceros unicornus)." Journal of Zoo and Wildlife Medicine (1998): 386-393.
- Walzer, C., H. Pucher, and F. Schwarzenberger. "A restraint chute for semen collection in white rhinoceros (Ceratotherium simum simum)—preliminary results." Proc. Eur. Assoc. Zoo Wildl. Vet.(EAZWV), Paris, France (2000): 7-10.
- Beehler, B. "RESTRAINT CHUTES."
- Schaffer, N. E., et al. "Methods of semen collection in an ambulatory greater one‐horned rhinoceros (rhinoceros unicornis)." Zoo Biology 9.3 (1990): 211-221.
- Roth, Terri L., et al. "Semen collection in rhinoceroses (Rhinoceros unicornis, Diceros bicornis, Ceratotherium simum) by electroejaculation with a uniquely designed probe." Journal of Zoo and Wildlife Medicine 36.4 (2005): 617-627.
- Silinski, S., et al. "Pharmacological methods of enhancing penile erection for ex-copula semen collection in standing white rhinoceros (Ceratotherium simum simum). " Proc. of the combined meeting of the EAZWV and the EWDA. Heidelberg, Germany. 2002.
- O'Brien, J. K., and T. L. Roth. "Post-coital sperm recovery and cryopreservation in the Sumatran rhinoceros (Dicerorhinus sumatrensis) and application to gamete rescue in the African black rhinoceros (Diceros bicornis)." Journal of reproduction and fertility 118.2 (2000): 263–271.
