= Alien Terror =

Alien Terror may refer to:

- Alien Terror, or The Incredible Invasion, a 1971 film starring Boris Karloff
- Alien Terror, or Alien 2: On Earth, a 1980 film and unauthorized sequel to Alien
