= Disperatamente Giulia =

- Written by: Ennio De Concini; Enrico Maria Salerno
- Directed by: Enrico Maria Salerno
- Music by: Francis Lai
- Country of origin: Italy
- Original language: Italian

Production
- Producers: Rete Italia; Titanus; Ciro Ippolito
- Cinematography: Ennio Guarnieri

Original release
- Release: 1989 – 1989

Disperatamente Giulia (also known as Julia Forever) is a 1989 Italian romance-drama mini series directed by Enrico Maria Salerno. Broadcast on Canale 5, it is based on the novel with the same name by Sveva Casati Modignani.

== Cast ==
- Tahnee Welch: Giulia De Blasco
- Fabio Testi: Ermes Corsini
- Dalila Di Lazzaro: Marta Montini
- Stéphane Ferrara: Leo Rovelli
- Enrico Maria Salerno: Ubaldo Milkovič
- Laura Antonelli: Carmen Milkovič
- Eros Pagni: Vittorio De Blasco
- Bekim Fehmiu: Old Armando Zani
- Marina Suma: Zaira
- Corinne Cléry: Elena Dionisi
- Nina Soldano: Diana
- Marina Berti: Silvia
- Jean-Pierre Cassel
- Vanni Corbellini
- Sabrina Siani
- Françoise Fabian
- Valeria Valeri
- Marisa Merlini
- Riccardo Garrone
