= Castellana Caves =

Karst cave system in Apulia, Italy

Grotte di Castellana (Castellana Caves)
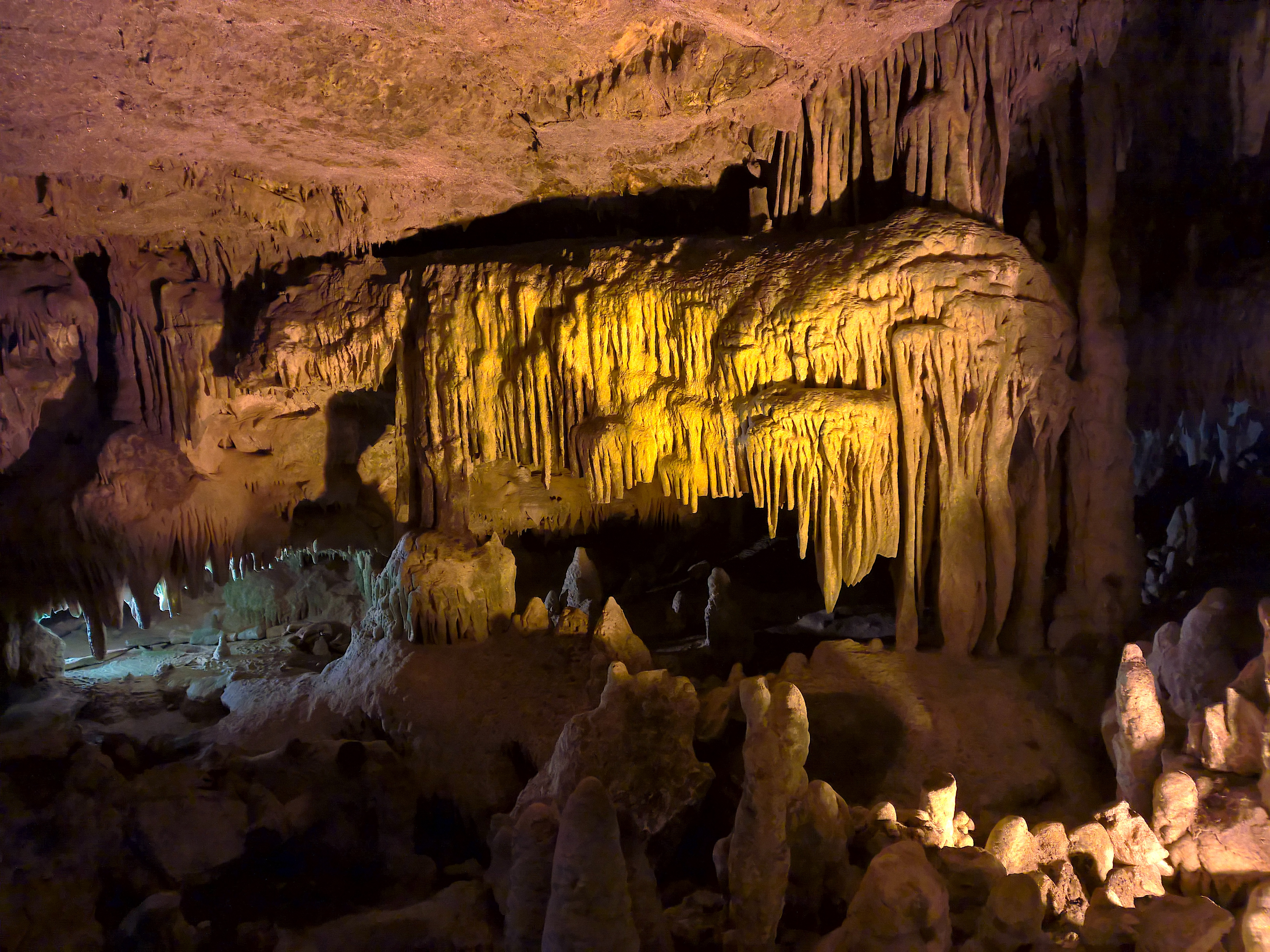
- View of the caves

- Location within Italy
- Location: Castellana Grotte (BA, Apulia, Italy)
- Coordinates: 40°52′32″N 17°08′59″E
- Length: 3,000 m
- Elevation: 263 m
- Discovery: 1938
- Geology: Karst cave
- Entrances: 1
- Access: Public
- Show cave opened: 1932
- Show cave length: 1,000 m
- Website: Official website

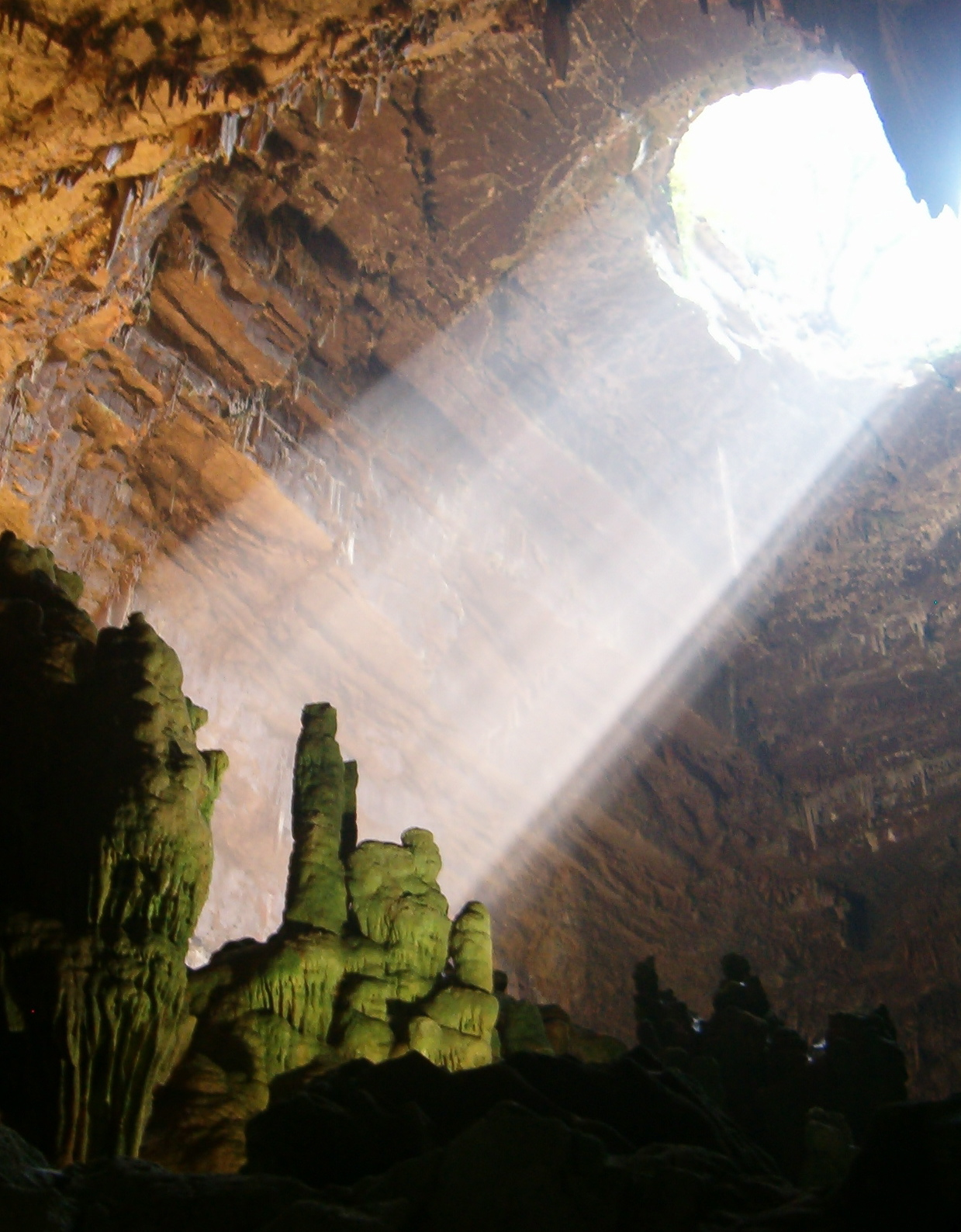
A view of the vault of "La Grave"

The Castellana Caves (Italian: Grotte di Castellana) are a karst cave system located in the municipality of Castellana Grotte, in the Metropolitan City of Bari, Apulia, southern Italy.

== Overview ==
The caves, discovered in 1938 by the speleologist Franco Anelli, are situated 1 kilometer (0.62 mi) south of Castellana and are served by the (Grotte di Castellana railway station) on the FSE line Bari-Putignano-Martina-Taranto.

The entrance is represented by an enormous vertical tunnel 60 meters (200 ft) long. The main cave is named "La Grave" (as abyss), and others are named Black Cavern (Caverna Nera), White Cave (Grotta Bianca) and Precipice Cavern (Caverna del Precipizio).

=== Description ===
The Caves of Castellana open in south-eastern Murge, a limestone plateau dating to the upper Cretaceous (ninety-hundred million years ago) and rising 330 metres above sea level. The area of Castellana is characterized by limestone, a sedimentary rock composed largely of calcium carbonate, known as the Limestone of Altamura. The cave system is 3348 meters in length and the point of maximum depth reaches 122 metres. The temperature within the caves is about 18 °C.

The caves are open all year round except for Christmas Day and New Year's Day. The visit develops along two itineraries: the first is 1 km long and lasts about 50 minutes while the second is 3 km long and lasts about two hours. During the summer there are also guided night tours. The Grave is the first and the biggest cave. It measures 100 m in length, 50 m in width, and 60 m in depth. Going beyond the Grave stalactites, stalagmites, curtains, and crystals continue to embellish the caves. The names of the environment are the result of the imagination of the early explorers: the She-Wolf, the Monuments, the Owl, the Little Virgin Mary, the Altar, the Precipice, the Desert Corridor, the Reverse Column, the Red Corridor, the Dome up to the last and the most dazzling one, the White Cave.

=== Peculiarity ===
Castellana's speleological complex is unique among other cave systems due to its three peculiarities: the Grave, the White Cave and the concretions.

=== The Grave ===
The Grave of Castellana is large due to its natural skylight surrounded by a circle of holm-oaks through which a ribbon of clear sky is visible. From the ceiling, a big sunbeam filters into the cave. Within the Grave, the sunlight illuminates a stalagmite group, called the Cyclopes because they look like sea giants rising out of a stormy sea. The southern walls, the big broken curtain, and the green moss-grown columns stay always in the darkness. Beyond these columns, are the architectural structures. The Grave is the first cave of the karst system and the only one communicating with the outside. Its history dates to ninety-one hundred million years ago in the upper Cretaceous. At that time Apulia was submerged by a sea where lived large colonies of molluscs and sea vegetables. For millions of years, generations of these life forms-plants and marine mollusks succeeded each other and died, so their empty shells and their carcasses were piled on the seabed, forming a giant deposit of mud and sand, that with continuous growth was compressed forming limestone layers for a thickness of several kilometers. Starting 66 million years ago, the gradual raising of the land brought the region to its current aspect. However, the newly emerged land was too rigid and for this reason, it was fractured. The eluvial water of large rainfall infiltrated the subsurface soil and rock creating a groundwater aquifer. The physical and chemical effects of water running underground dissolved the limestone and enlarged the fractures. Over geological eras, cracks expanded to become galleries and then caverns. In some instances, numerous cracks intersected, leading to frequent collapses. The thickness of the rock separating the cave from the outside had diminished significantly, causing the vault to collapse. This occurred in the Grave of Castellana, allowing sunlight into the cave.

=== The White Cave ===
At the end of the underground itinerary and about 1500 metres from the Grave there is a small portal dig in an alabaster wall. This is the entrance of the White Cave. The white alabaster and drip water crystals cover every corner with very white translucent stalagmites. This includes two high and large columns that seem to support the vault with white stalactites and coral concretions.

=== Concretions and eccentric stalactites ===
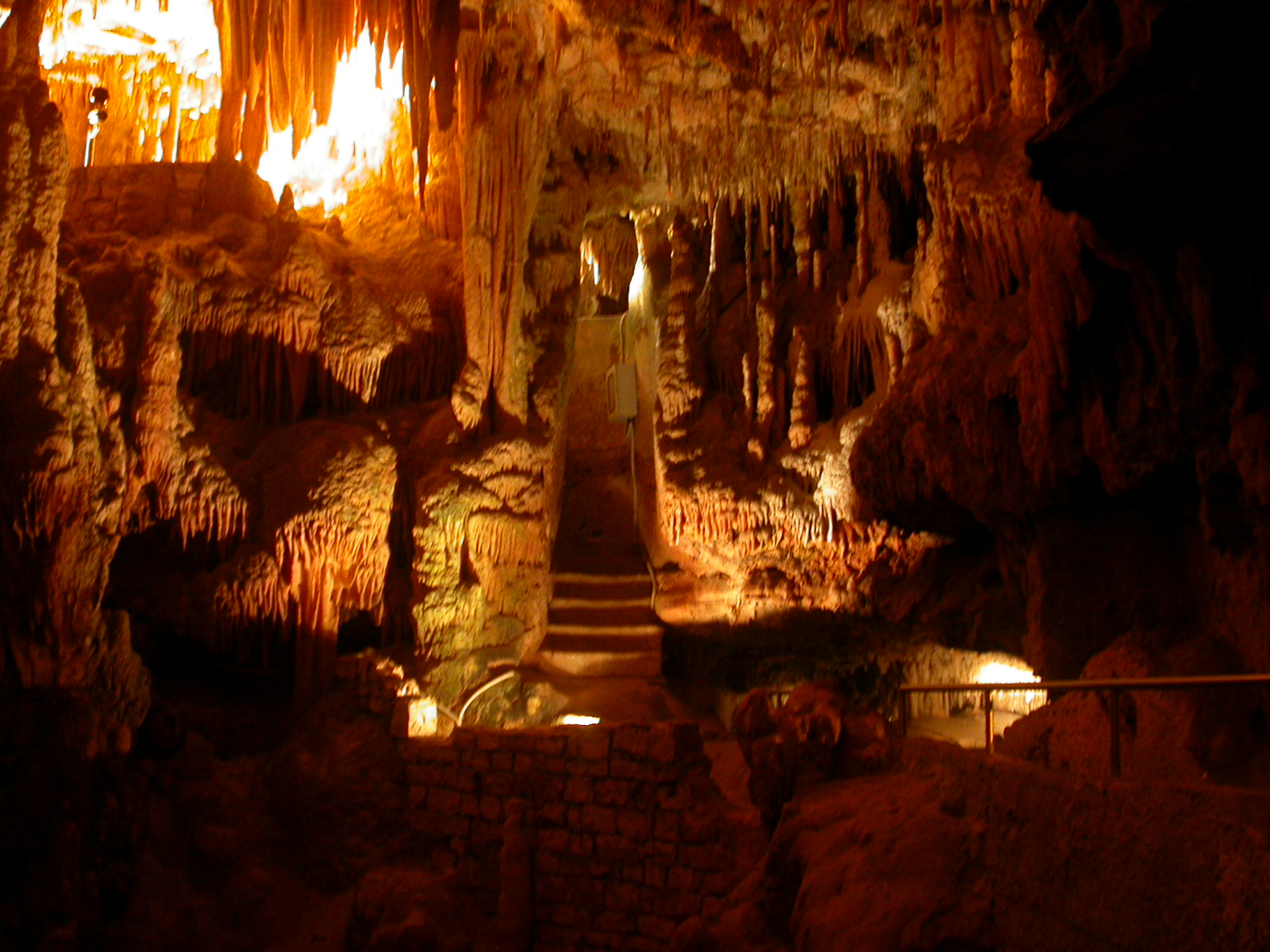
Castellana Caves

A feature of the Caves of Castellana are the concretions, the mineral deposits that covered the walls of a cave by crystallisation of the calcite carried in solution by infiltrating rain water, that had penetrated the overhanging layers of the rock. When the water drips through the roof of an empty cavern, the calcite dissolved in it deposits on the roof and going downwards takes the shape of a stalactite. When the drop of water falls on the floor, the calcite takes the shape of a stalagmite. As time went by, the downwards extension of a stalactite and the progressive growth of the below stalagmite led to the formation of a column. Besides these elementary forms, there are other concretions such as calcite flowstones, curtains, (which are due to the flowing of water), corals, calcite crystals, (which formed underwater), cave pearls, formed of concentric layers as calcite crystallizes on a nucleus such as a microscopic grain of rock, and the eccentric concretions. Some stalactites grow multi-directionally, i.e. horizontally to the floor, developing curved patterns.

According to speleology, there are several hypotheses about their origin of the unusual stalactites. The first factor is the possible presence of draughts in the caves that would drive horizontally the direction of the drops and therefore the growth of the concretion. The second factor has to do with the particular form in which calcite crystallizes. Calcite is a mineral that crystallizes in the trigonal system and has perfect rhombohedral cleavage. The cannula of a stalactite is formed by a series of very small rhombohedra which interpenetrate each other. If, as consequence of several causes, the cannula is perforated on the side, water will come out through that opening and will create an aggregate of other rhombohedra on the side. The third one is the presence of any impurities in the water. They can hinder the growth of a calcite rhombohedron in a direction and thus it can form an aggregate on the side that will follow a different direction.

There are also eccentric stalactites whose central cannula is very thin (the diameter is less than one millimetre) and so the water flows very slowly. At the end of this stalactite there is always a droplet whose calcite crystals can align randomly so the formation follows a new direction.

== Discovery ==
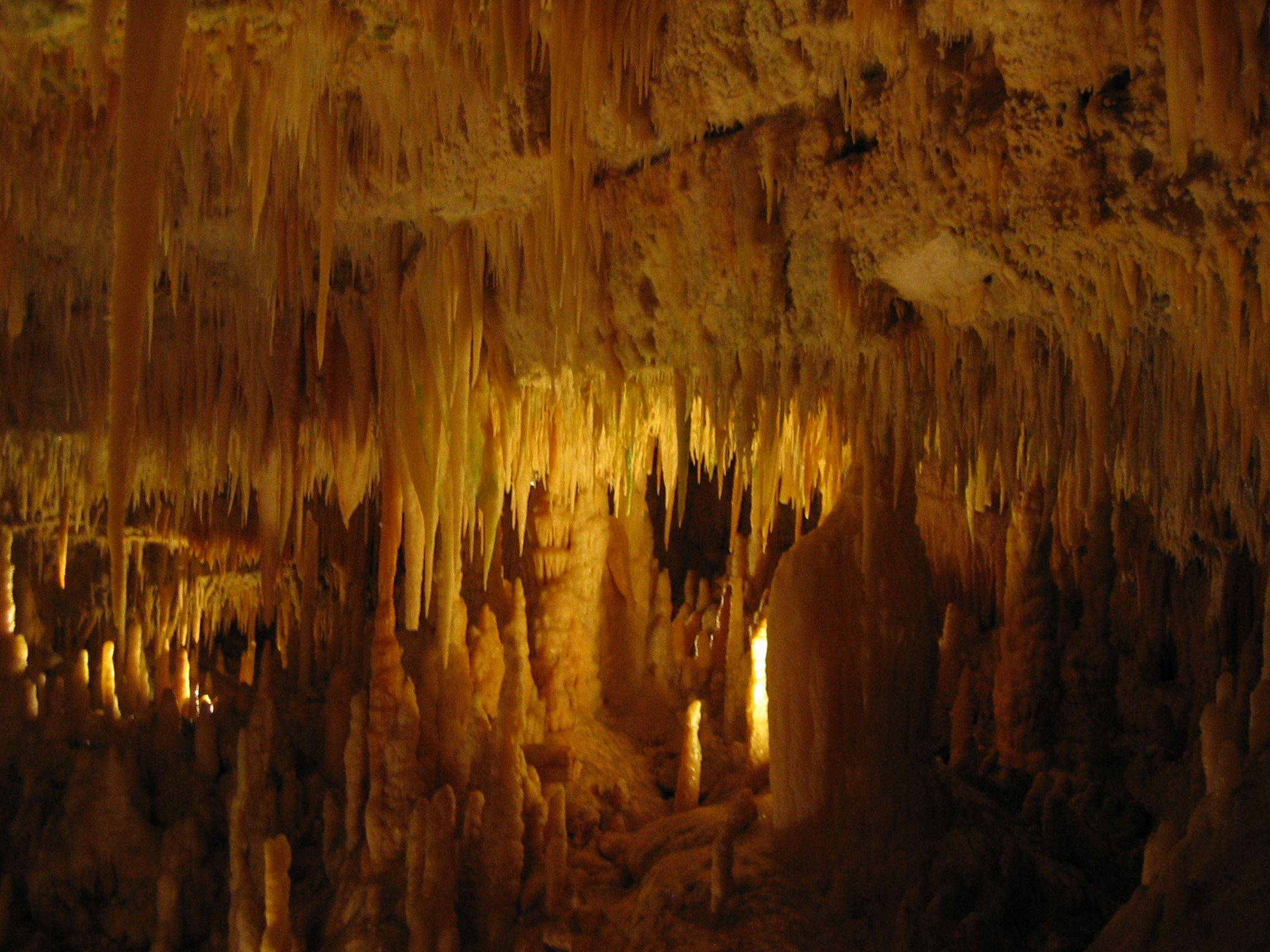
Castellana Caves

In 1938 the Provincial Tourist Board of Bari asked the Italian Institute of Speleology of Postojna for a speleologist to make an inspection in some caves of the area that have been already explored to turn them into a tourist attraction. But none of them, because of their limited extension, was in this way useful.

The 23 January 1938, finally, Anelli climbed down into the Grave, whose bottom was full of a large amount of waste material, accumulated there by the passing of time. He descended to the floor, and then he ventured out to a corridor that disappeared into the darkness and then he found himself in a passage half hidden by stalactites and stalagmites and finally in a huge cave, later called "Cave of the Monuments". This cavern was so large that his acetylene lamp could not light the vault and the walls and so he decided to come back two days later to continue his exploration. This time Anelli was helped by a worker from Castellana, Vito Matarrese. Together they descended into the cave and continued the exploration for more than 300 metres. They stopped at the end of a short descending gallery in front of a deep abyss, today known as the Snake Corridor.

Two months later, in March 1938, Anelli came back to Castellana and, again with Matarrese, continued the exploration. But, once more, he had to stop by reaching a new chasm more than 600 metres far from the first cave. Professor Anelli spent several days in Castellana and started the first survey on the caves, which was completed in September 1938. When Anelli left Castellana, it was Vito Matarrese who was responsible for the exploration of the caves. He climbed over the precipice of the Desert Corridor and discovered the last cave, the White Cave, in 1940.

== Fauna ==
Many animals live in the caves of Castellana and some of them are new endemic species. They are:

- Isopods Murgeoniscus anellii and Castellanethes sanfilippoi
- Pseudoscorpion Hadoblothrus gigas
- Beetles Tychobythinus anelli and Italodytes stammeri

There are also a large number of Troglophilus andreinii cave crickets.

The most typical animal of the cave is the bat, the only mammals capable of true flight. In the caves of Castellana there are five species of small bats. They are: Miniopterus schreibersii, Rhinolophus ferrumequinum, Rhinolophus mehelyi, Rhinolophus euryale and Myotis capaccinii.

== Legends ==
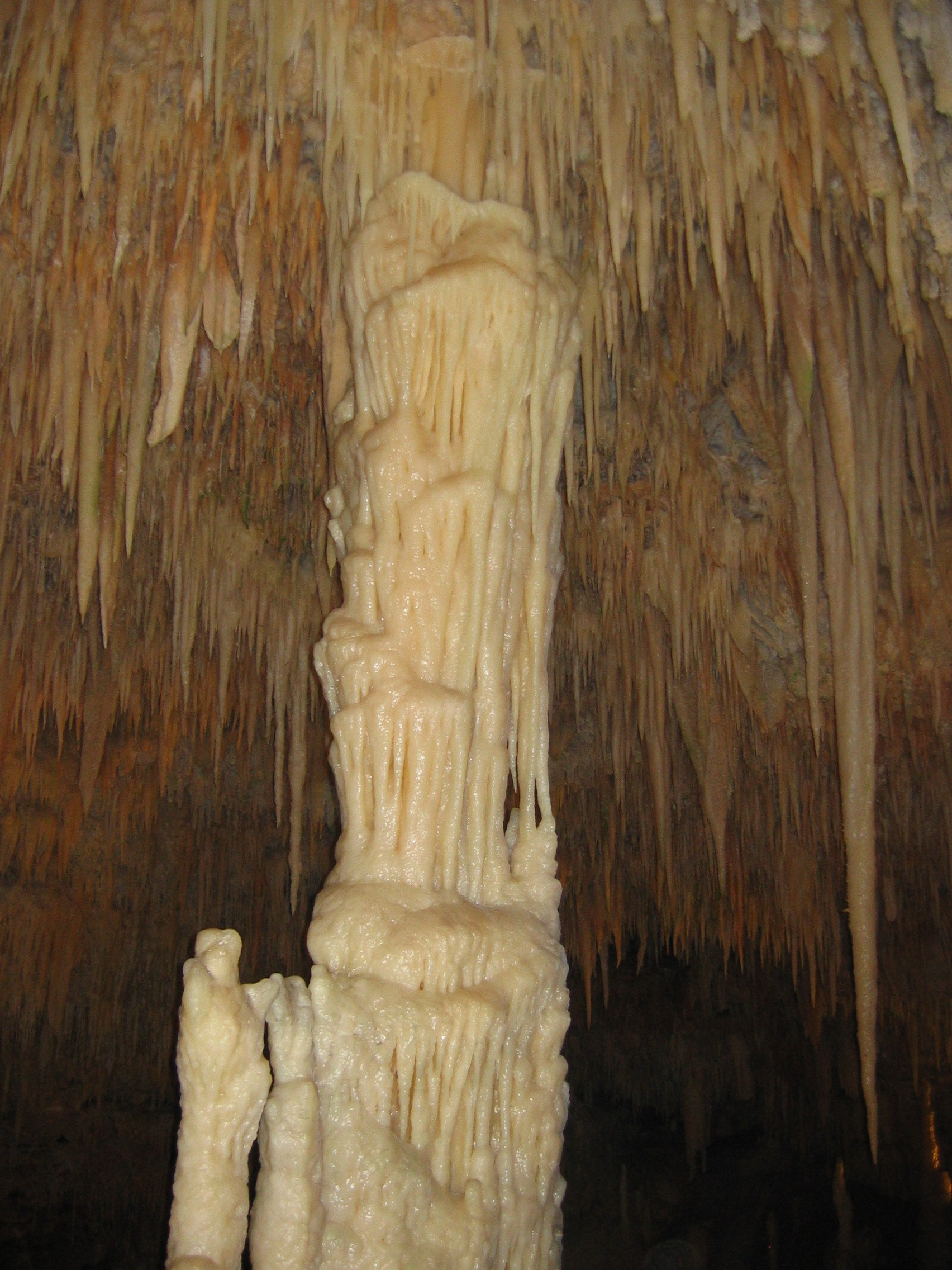
Castellana Caves

The entrance of the Grave, that is to say the deep chasm, had struck terror into the people going along the nearby country street, above all at twilight. It could have happened that the superstitious wayfarers saw, together with the bats flying out of the cave chasm to eat insects in the fields of the area, strange vapours that they thought were the souls of the suicides who had thrown themselves down the Grave, and were trying to go to heaven in vain but Satan was holding them down because suicides are a sin leading to hell.

Vincenzo Longo (1737–1825), humanist and expert on law from Castellana, probably was the first man who descended in the Grave together with a big group of young people. In the 19th century, the Chorographical-Universal Dictionary of Italy vouched for the truth of the achievement: A little more than a mile far from Castellana there is a natural sight, a chasm called the Grave by common people. Its entrance is an hole about 180 spans in circumference and about 300 spans in depth. In the previous century some brave inhabitants of Castellana descend into the Grave early in the morning. They used ropes and hawsers and went along dark corridors for several miles. After 24 hours, while their relatives and friends were very worrying about the long wait, they came back to surface.

== Speleological museum "Franco Anelli" ==
The speleological museum of the Caves of Castellana, "Franco Anelli", was inaugurated on 23 January 2000, on the 62nd anniversary of the discovery of the caves. It is dedicated to Professor Franco Anelli (1899–1977), born in Lodi, who was speleologist, discover, populariser as well as director of the Caves of Castellana. The museum is managed by Gruppo Puglia Grotte, the speleological association of Castellana founded in 1971, on behalf of Grotte di Castellana Company. According to Anelli the visit at the Speleological Museum would have been an "easy delightful excursion over the pages of a fascinating book, the book of the caves: few orderly chapters to provide a commentary for a ponderous volume, that of the Science of caves". This is the aim of the museum. The museum is located in the a building planned in 1952 by the architect Pietro Favia (1895–1972). It allows the tourist to delve into science and speleology and represents a reference point for the speleological research in Apulia. It houses the Centre of Speleological Documentation of the Apulian Speleological Federation "Franco Orofino" that includes a speleological library, a newspaper, periodical library and an archive of photographs.

=== Educational workshops ===
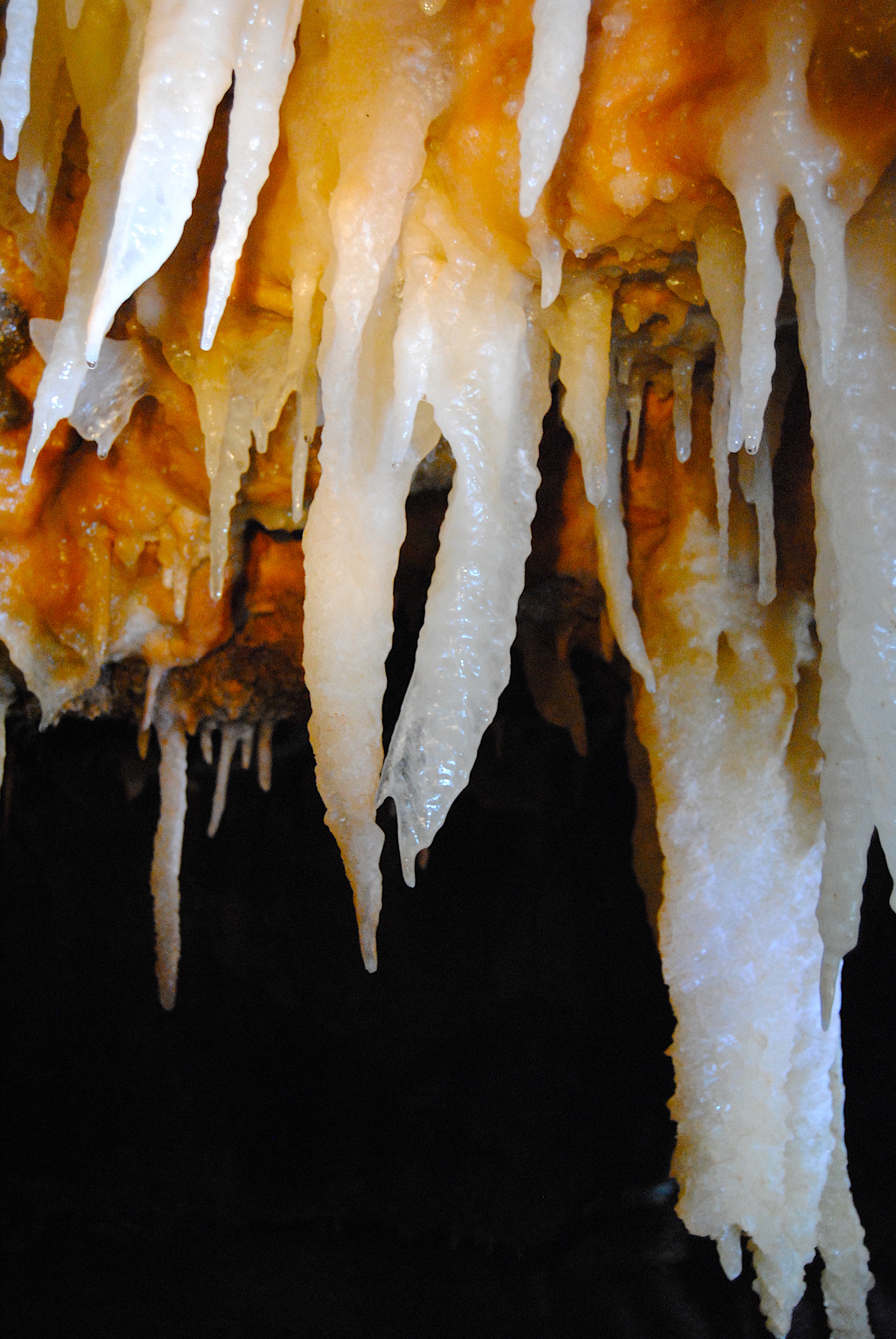
Castellana Caves

For several years the speleological museum "Franco Anelli" has provided tours, educational workshops, and speleological tours in the secondary forks of the caves. The educational workshops cover astronomy, science of caves, speleology, bio-speleology, geology and ecology. They share Professor Anelli's idea to spread among school students "the knowledge about the underground world and the scientific studies related to it through lively visual illustration of the subsurface and the physical, biological and anthropic phenomena which take place in the underground or which took place thousands of years ago at the time of the geological history of Italy". Moreover, in the museum are offered cultural activities to promote education and learning by means of interactive workshops and lessons held inside the caves. One of these cultural activities is speleojunior that gives students the opportunity to feel the darkness and to learn features of the caves.

== Historical events ==
Among the most famous visitors of the caves in the period of their launching as tourist attraction there were Luigi Einaudi (1874–1961), Aldo Moro (1916–1978), Enrico Mattei (1906–1962), Gina Lollobrigida, Silvana Pampanini, Margareth aus England (1930–2002) and Tito Schipa (1888–1965). Similarly, several film producers were fascinated by the caves and eight films were shot in the caves. They are: The Age of the Love (1953) by Michael Hamilton (but he is Lionello De Felice), Hercules in the Haunted World (1961) by Mario Bava and Franco Prosperi, Maciste in Hell (1962) by Riccardo Freda; Casanova 70 (1965) by Mario Monicelli, The King of Criminals (1968) by Paul Maxwell (but he is Paolo Bianchini); Stellar Clashes beyond the Third Dimension (1978) by Lewis Coates (but he is Luigi Cozzi); Alien 2: On Earth (1980) by Sam Cromwell (but he is Ciro Ippolito) and Biagio Proietti and an episode of the TV series Holiday Profession (1986) by Vittorio De Sisti. Additionally, two films by Antonio Leonviola shot here: TAUR IL RE DELLA FORZA BRUTA (1963), and its sequel LE GLADIATRICI (1963). The English version of the former (TOR, MIGHTY WARRIOR) carries an end credit which says "The producers wish to express their gratitude to the Yugoslave (sic) authorities for granting permission to shoot some scenes in the grottoes of Postumia". The underworld scenes of ARRIVANO I TITANI by Duccio Tessari also seem to have been filmed here.

== Transport ==
Castellana caves are served by Castellana caves railway station. Castellana caves are served by the following nearby airports:

- Bari Airport
- Brindisi Airport

Castellana caves are also served by Cotrap and FS Sud Est buses.

== Bibliography ==
- Anelli Franco, Castellana – Arcano mondo sotterraneo in Terra di Bari. Nuova Postumia d’Italia, Castellana Grotte, 1954.
- Carpinelli Gaetano Sergio, Speleonight, speleologia e divulgazione attraverso escursioni turistico-emozionali nelle Grotte di Castellana. Studio statistico pilota, Gruppo Puglia Grotte, Spelaion 2011.
- Lovece Daniela, Pace Pino, Il cinema alle Grotte di Castellana (Castellana-Grotte, Puglia), in Grotte e dintorni, 11, 2006.
- Lovece Daniela, Pace Pino, Le prime immagini delle Grotte di Castellana, in Grotte e dintorni, 14, 2007.
- Manghisi Vincenzo, Le Grotte di Castellana. Cinquant’anni di storia e d’immagine, Nuova Editrice Apulia, 1990.
- Manghisi Vincenzo, Franco Anelli (1899–1977) – Un maestro di speleologia e di vita, in Grotte e dintorni, 1, Castellana-Grotte, 2001.
- Manghisi Vincenzo, Pace Pino, Guida illustrata alle Grotte di Castellana, Castellana-Grotte, 2006.
- Manghisi Vincenzo, Pace Pino, La Grave di Castellana-Grotte tra storia e leggenda, Martina Franca, 2009.
- Pace Pino, La vocazione didattica del Museo Speleologico Franco Anelli, Gruppo Puglia Grotte, Spelaion 2011.
- Regione Puglia, Federazione Speleologica Pugliese, Grotte e carsismo in Puglia, Castellana-Grotte, 2007.
- Reina Alessandro, Parise Mario, Geologia delle Grotte di Castellana: ipotesi speleogenetiche. In Geologi e Territorio, 1, 2004

== See also ==
- List of caves
- List of caves in Italy
