= Vanilla and Chocolate =

- Directed by: Ciro Ippolito
- Written by: Franco Ferrini; Ciro Ippolito
- Based on: a novella by Sveva Casati Modignani
- Starring: Maria Grazia Cucinotta; Joaquín Cortés
- Cinematography: Fabio Cianchetti
- Music by: Maurizio Abeni
- Release date: 2004
- Language: Italian

Vanilla and Chocolate (Italian: Vaniglia e cioccolato) is a 2004 Italian romance film directed by Ciro Ippolito.

== Cast ==
- Maria Grazia Cucinotta: Penelope
- Joaquín Cortés: Carlos
- Alessandro Preziosi: Andrea
- Roberta Alberti: young Penelope
- Serra Yilmaz: Diomira
- Ernesto Mahieux: Briganti
- Licinia Lentini: Irene
