= Homosexual behavior in animals =

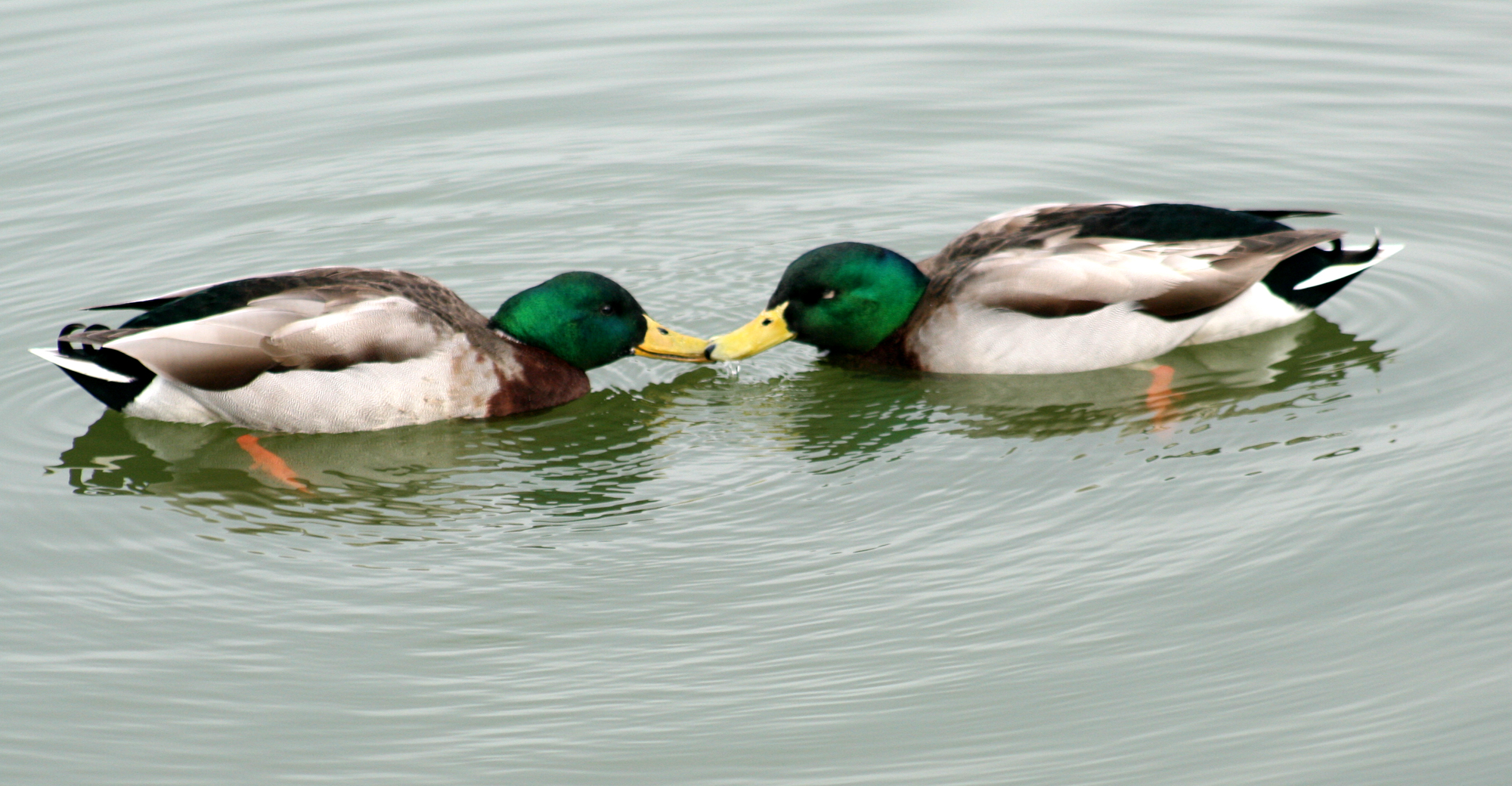
Two male mallards (Anas platyrhynchos)

Various non-human animal species exhibit behavior that can be interpreted as homosexual or bisexual, often referred to as same-sex sexual behavior (SSSB) by scientists. This may include same-sex sexual activity, courtship, affection, pair bonding, and parenting among same-sex animal pairs. Various forms of this are found among a variety of vertebrate and arthropod taxonomic classes. The sexual behavior of non-human animals takes many different forms, even within the same species, though homosexual behavior is best known from social species.

Scientists observe same-sex sexual behavior in animals in different degrees and forms among different species and clades. A 2019 paper states that it has been observed in over 1,500 species. Although same-sex interactions involving genital contact have been reported in many animal species, they are routinely manifested in only a few, including humans. Other than humans, the only known species to exhibit exclusive homosexual orientation is the domesticated sheep (Ovis aries), involving about 10% of males. The motivations for and implications of these behaviors are often lensed through anthropocentric thinking; Bruce Bagemihl states that any hypothesis is "necessarily an account of human interpretations of these phenomena".

Proposed causes for same-sex sexual behavior vary across species. Theories include mistaken identity (especially for arthropods), sexually antagonistic selection, balancing selection, practice of behaviors needed for reproduction, expression of social dominance or submission, and social bonding. Genetic, hormonal, and neurological variations as a basis for individual behavioral differences within species have been proposed, and same-sex sexual behavior has been induced in laboratory animals by these means.

== In relation to humans ==
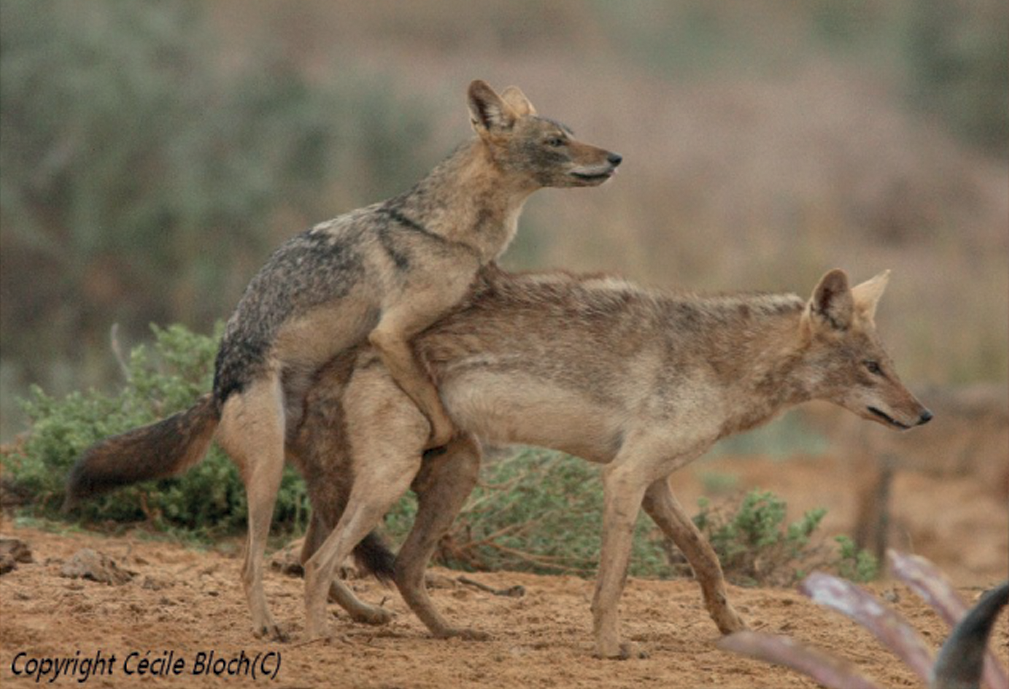
Two male African wolves (Canis lupaster)

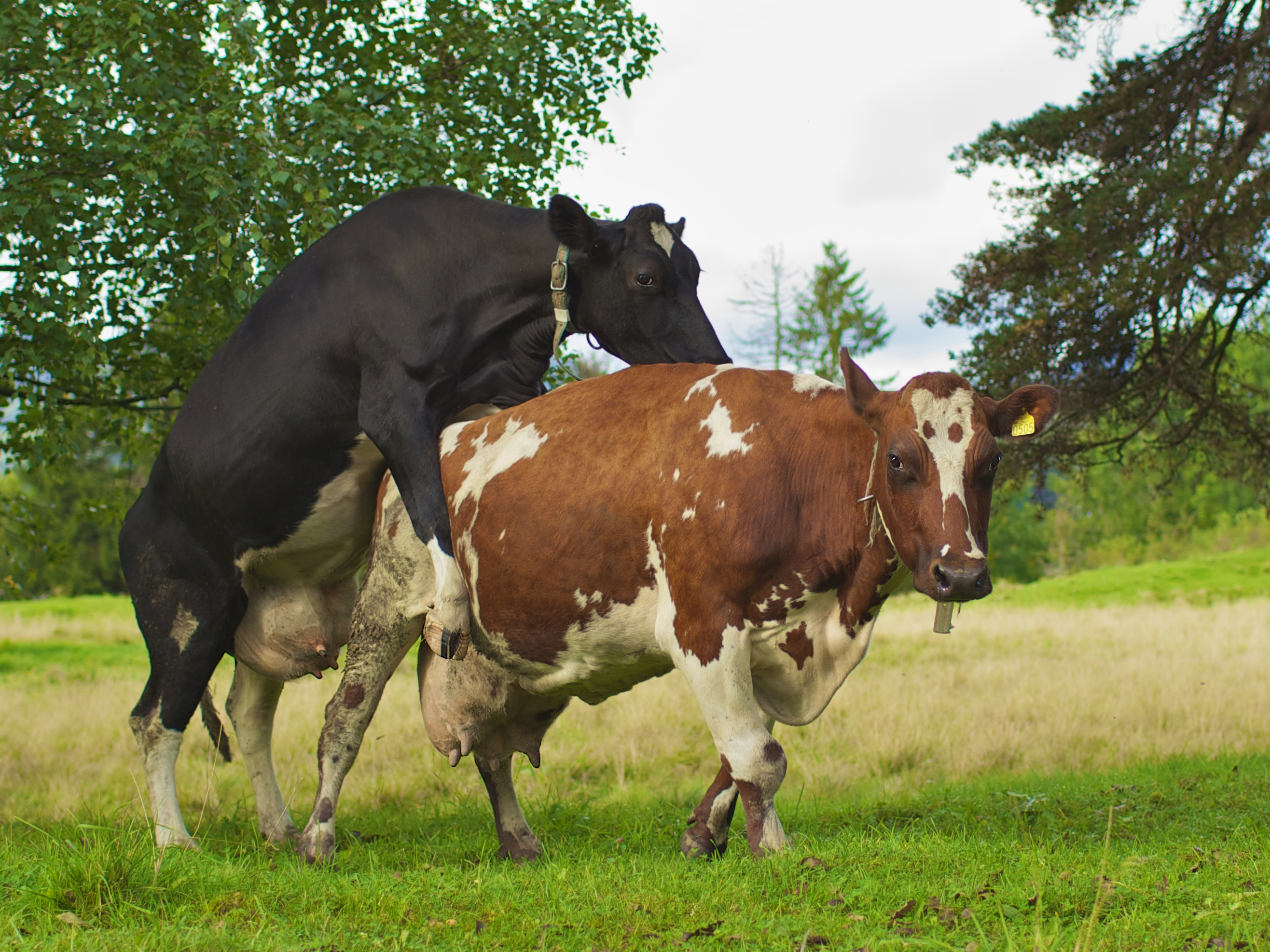
Two cows "bulling" during oestrus.

Courtship behavior in male fruit flies

=== Applying the term homosexual to animals ===
The term homosexual was coined by the Hungarian writer and campaigner Karl Maria Kertbeny in 1868 to describe same-sex sexual attraction and sexual behavior in humans. Its use in animal studies has been controversial for two main reasons: animal sexuality and motivating factors have been and remain poorly understood, and the term has strong cultural implications in western society that are irrelevant for species other than humans. Thus homosexual behavior has been given a number of terms over the years. According to Bagemihl, when describing animals, the term homosexual is preferred over gay, lesbian, and other terms currently in use, as these are seen as even more bound to human homosexuality.

Bailey et al. says:

Homosexual: in animals, this has been used to refer to same-sex behavior that is not sexual in character (e.g. 'homosexual tandem running' in termites), same-sex courtship or copulatory behavior occurring over a short period of time (e.g. 'homosexual mounting' in cockroaches and rams) or long-term pair bonds between same-sex partners that might involve any combination of courting, copulating, parenting and affectional behaviors (e.g. 'homosexual pair bonds' in gulls). In humans, the term is used to describe individual sexual behaviors as well as long-term relationships, but in some usages connotes a gay or lesbian social identity. Scientific writing would benefit from reserving this anthropomorphic term for humans and not using it to describe behavior in other animals, because of its deeply rooted context in human society.

Animal preference and motivation is always inferred from behavior. In wild animals, researchers will not be able to map the entire life of an individual, and must infer from frequency of single observations of behavior. The correct usage of the term homosexual is that an animal exhibits homosexual behavior or even same-sex sexual behavior; however, this article conforms to the usage by modern research, applying the term homosexuality to all sexual behavior (copulation, genital stimulation, mating games and sexual display behavior) between animals of the same sex. In most instances, it is presumed that the homosexual behavior is but part of the animal's overall sexual behavioral repertoire, making the animal "bisexual" rather than "homosexual" as the terms are commonly understood in humans.

=== Nature ===
The observation of homosexual behavior in animals can be seen as both an argument for and against the acceptance of homosexuality in humans, and has been used especially against the claim that it is a peccatum contra naturam ("sin against nature"). For instance, homosexuality in animals was cited by the American Psychological Association and other groups in their amici curiae brief to the United States Supreme Court in Lawrence v. Texas, which ultimately struck down the sodomy laws of 14 states.

== Research ==
A majority of the research available concerning homosexual behavior in animals lacks specification between animals that exclusively exhibit same-sex tendencies and those that participate in heterosexual and homosexual mating activities interchangeably. This lack of distinction has led to differing opinions and conflicting interpretations of collected data amongst scientists and researchers. For instance, Bruce Bagemihl, author of the book Biological Exuberence: Animal Homosexuality and Natural Diversity, emphasizes that there are no anatomical or endocrinological differences between exclusively homosexual and exclusively heterosexual animal pairs. However, if the definition of "homosexual behavior" is made to include animals that participate in both same-sex and opposite-sex mating activities, hormonal differences have been documented among key sex hormones, such as testosterone and estradiol, when compared to those who participate solely in heterosexual mating.

Many of the animals used in laboratory-based studies of homosexuality do not appear to spontaneously exhibit these tendencies often in the wild. Such behavior is often elicited and exaggerated by the researcher during experimentation through the destruction of a portion of brain tissue, or by exposing the animal to high levels of steroid hormones prenatally. Information gathered from these studies is limited when applied to spontaneously occurring same-sex behavior in animals outside of the laboratory.

Homosexual behaviour in animals has been discussed since classical antiquity. The earliest written mention of animal homosexuality appears to date back to 2,300 years ago, when Aristotle (384–322 BC) described copulation between pigeons, partridges and quails of the same sex. The Hieroglyphics of Horapollo, written in the 4th century AD by the Egyptian writer Horapollo, mentions "hermaphroditism" in hyenas and homosexuality in partridges. The first review of animal homosexuality was written by the zoologist Ferdinand Karsch-Haack in 1900.

Academic research into the ubiquity of same-sex sexual behavior was not carried out on a large scale, possibly due to observer bias caused by social attitudes to same-sex sexual behavior, innocent confusion, lack of interest, distaste, scientists fearing loss of their grants or even from a fear of "being ridiculed by their colleagues". Georgetown University biologist Janet Mann states "Scientists who study the topic are often accused of trying to forward an agenda, and their work can come under greater scrutiny than that of their colleagues who study other topics." They also noted "Not every sexual act has a reproductive function ... that's true of humans and non-humans." Studies have demonstrated homosexual behavior in a number of species, but the true extent of homosexuality in animals is not known.

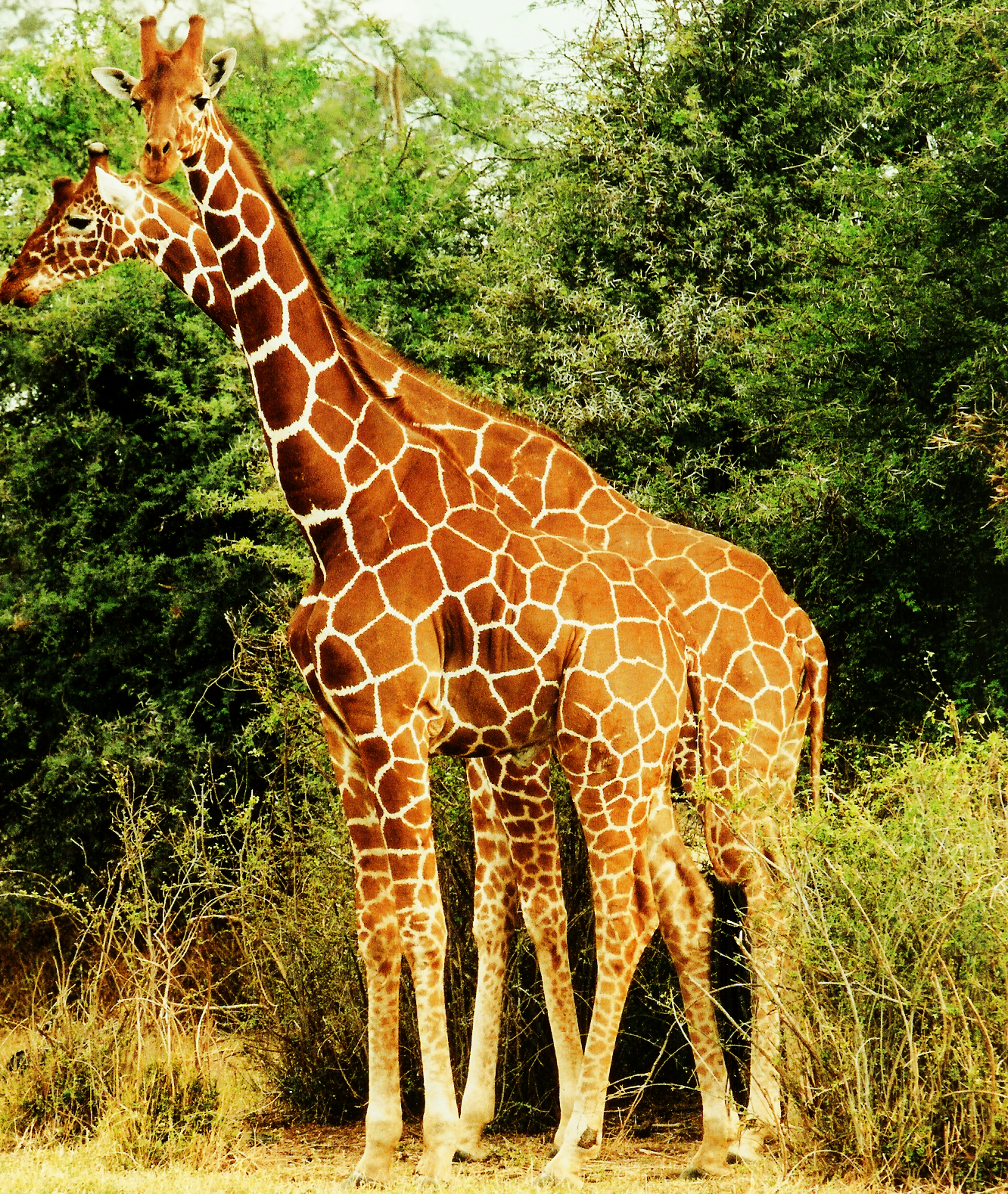
Two male giraffes in Kenya

Some researchers believe this behavior to have its origin in male social organization and social dominance, similar to the dominance traits shown in prison sexuality. Others, particularly Bagemihl, Joan Roughgarden, Thierry Lodé and Paul Vasey suggest the social function of sex (both homosexual and heterosexual) is not necessarily connected to dominance, but serves to strengthen alliances and social ties within a flock. While reports on many such mating scenarios are still only anecdotal, a growing body of scientific work confirms that permanent homosexuality occurs not only in species with permanent pair bonds, but also in non-monogamous species like sheep. One report on sheep found that 8% of rams exhibited homosexual preferences—that is, even when given a choice, they chose male over female partners. In fact, apparent homosexual individuals are known from all of the traditional domestic species, from sheep, cattle and horses to cats, dogs and budgerigars. In October 2023, biologists reported studies of animals (over 1,500 different species) that found same-sex behavior (not necessarily related to human orientation) may help improve social stability by reducing conflict within the groups studied.

== Basis ==
Sexual behaviors often require a significant energy investment. When sexual behaviors produce offspring, there is an obvious benefit for the animal. However, the benefit from performing homosexual behaviors (which cannot result in the production of offspring) is less obvious, and some scientists have called it a "Darwinian paradox" because it is non-reproductive. A number of non-exclusive different explanations for the emergence of such traits have been put forward.

=== Physiological basis ===
A definite physiological explanation or reason for homosexual activity in animal species has not been agreed upon by researchers in the field. Numerous scholars are of the opinion that varying levels (either higher or lower) of the sex hormones in the animal, in addition to the size of the animal's gonads, play a direct role in the sexual behavior and preference exhibited by that animal. Others firmly argue no evidence to support these claims exists when comparing animals of a specific species exhibiting homosexual behavior exclusively and those that do not. Ultimately, empirical support from comprehensive endocrinological studies exist for both interpretations. Researchers found no evidence of differences in the measurements of the gonads, or the levels of the sex hormones of exclusively homosexual western gulls and ring-billed gulls.

Additional studies pertaining to hormone involvement in homosexual behavior indicate that when administering treatments of testosterone and estradiol to female heterosexual animals, the elevated hormone levels increase the likelihood of homosexual behavior. Additionally, boosting the levels of sex hormones during an animal's pregnancy appears to increase the likelihood of it birthing a homosexual offspring.

=== Genetic basis ===
Researchers found that disabling the fucose mutarotase (FucM) gene in laboratory mice – which influences the levels of estrogen to which the brain is exposed – caused the female mice to behave as if they were male as they grew up. "The mutant female mouse underwent a slightly altered developmental programme in the brain to resemble the male brain in terms of sexual preference" said professor Chankyu Park of the Korea Advanced Institute of Science and Technology in Daejon, South Korea, who led the research. His findings were published in the BMC Genetics journal on July 7, 2010. Another study found that by manipulating a gene in fruit flies (Drosophila), homosexual behavior appeared to have been induced. However, in addition to homosexual behavior, several abnormal behaviors were also exhibited apparently due to this mutation.

=== Neurobiological basis ===
In March 2011, research showed that serotonin is involved in the mechanism of sexual orientation of mice. A study conducted on fruit flies found that inhibiting the dopamine neurotransmitter inhibited lab-induced homosexual behavior.

=== Other hypotheses ===
One proposal for the adaptive function of homosexual behavior is the formation of alliances and mutual social benefit to the animals. Studies support this in specific species, such as black swans, where a quarter of mate pairs consist of two males, who mate with a female and chase her away once she lays the egg, then raise it themselves. These M-M pairs have great success in defending their territory and resources, and keep their young alive until fledgling 80% of the time, compared to 30% for M-F pairs.

Studies done on homosexual behavior in birds showed a negative correlation between a species' relative parental investment and F-F homosexual behaviors, i.e. in species whose females invested more time and care into their young relative to males, F-F sexual encounters happened less often. Similarly, there was a negative correlation between relative parental investment and M-M homosexual behaviors. This meant that species exhibiting a high degree of polygamy (where females often are the exclusive caretakers of the young) F-F sexual behaviors were very rare, whereas in a socially monogamous species (in which a M-F pair works together to care for young) they were much more common. The trend was opposite for males, in polygamous species M-M sexual behaviors were quite common and in socially monogamous species they were rare. The study argues that release from parental care, a very energy intensive investment, allows the opportunities for homosexual behaviors to be exhibited, and higher parental care prevents homosexual behaviors from occurring because of the energy cost of the behaviors.

A 2019 paper hypothesized that when sex first began to evolve, there was no distinction between homosexuality and heterosexuality, and animals mated with other members of their species indiscriminately. This is a contrast to most perspectives, which try to find explanations for the evolution of homosexual behaviors and separate it completely from the evolution of heterosexual behaviors. The study states that it is unlikely that sexual behaviors evolved simultaneously to the evolution of traits necessary to recognize a compatible sexual mate, such as size, shape, odor, and color. As those secondary sex characteristics evolved, sexuality would have become more discriminatory, leading to less homosexuality, but homosexual behaviors would rarely have had enough cost to be selected against and removed entirely from a population. Additionally, the cost of homosexual behavior would be offset by the cost of mate recognition, which requires psychological adaptations, and excessive discrimination in mate choice can lead to missing out of mating opportunities. With indiscriminate mating, these factors are irrelevant. The paper notes that in some species, especially where survival is very difficult and each energy-related decision could mean the animal's death, homosexual behavior would be strongly selected against, leading to strictly heterosexual species.

== Some select species and groups ==
=== Birds ===
==== Black swans ====
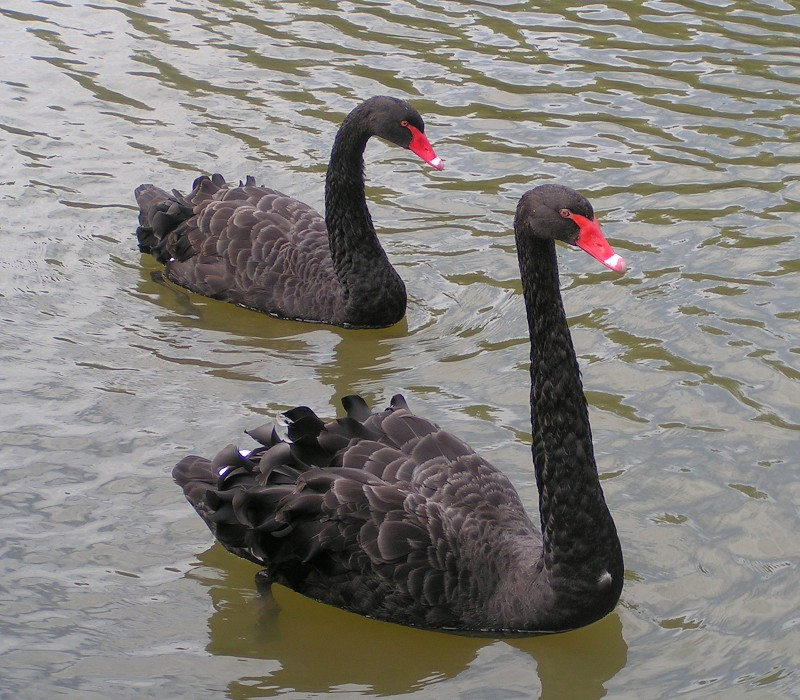
Male black swans (Cygnus atratus)

An estimated one-quarter of all black swan pairings are of males. They steal nests, or form temporary threesomes with females to obtain eggs, driving away the female after she lays the eggs. The males spent time in each other's society, guarded the common territory, performed greeting ceremonies before each other, and (in the reproductive period) pre-marital rituals, and if one of the birds tried to sit on the other, an intense fight began. More of their cygnets survive to adulthood than those of different-sex pairs, possibly due to their superior ability to defend large portions of land. The same reasoning has been applied to male flamingo pairs raising chicks.

==== Albatrosses ====
Female Laysan albatrosses, on the north-western tip of the island of Oahu, Hawaii, form pairs for co-growing offspring. On the observed island, the number of females considerably exceeds the number of males (59% N=102/172), so 31% of females, after mating with males, create partnerships for hatching and feeding chicks. Compared to male-female couples, female-female partnerships have a lower hatching rate (87% vs 41%) and lower overall reproductive success (67% vs 31%).

Warming waters from climate change have led to increased foraging times and thus increased mortality among female black-browed albatrosses on the Antipodes Islands in New Zealand. The skewed gender imbalance has led to many male albatrosses forming homosexual relationships. Male-male pairs now comprise between 2–5% of the albatross population on the islands.

==== Blue ducks ====
In 2009, a UK-based captive breeding program for blue ducks (involving two males and one female) was derailed when the two males paired with each other instead of with the female that they were assigned to mate with.

==== Ibises ====
Research has shown that the environmental pollutant methylmercury can increase the prevalence of homosexual behavior in male American white ibis. The study involved exposing chicks in varying dosages to the chemical and measuring the degree of homosexual behavior in adulthood. The results discovered was that as the dosage was increased the likelihood of homosexual behavior also increased. The endocrine blocking feature of mercury has been suggested as a possible cause of sexual disruption in other bird species.

==== Mallards ====
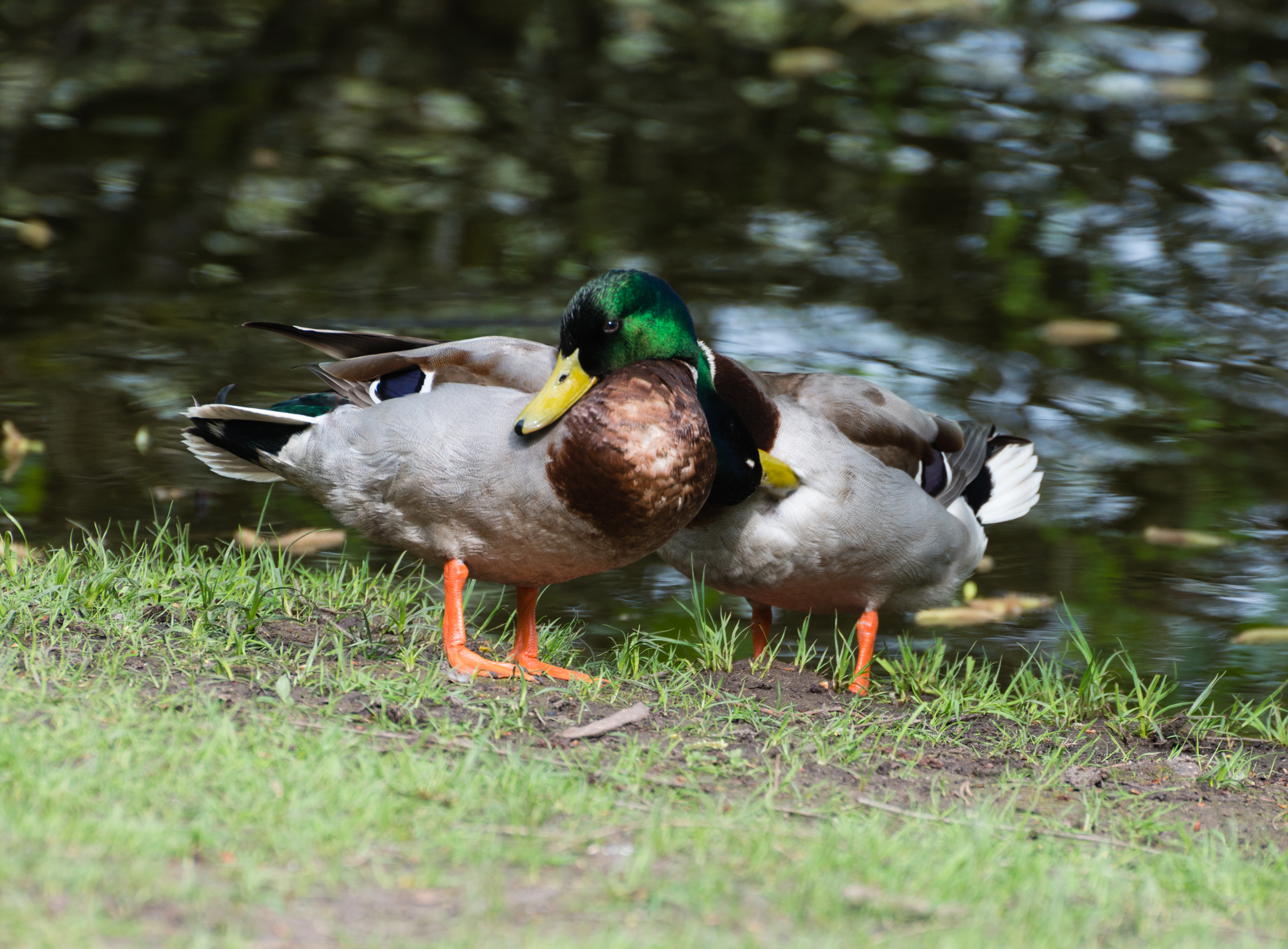
Two male mallards (Anas platyrhynchos)

Mallards form male-female pairs only until the female lays eggs, at which time the male leaves the female. Mallards have rates of male-male sexual activity that are unusually high for birds, in some cases, as high as 19% of all pairs in a population. Kees Moeliker of the Natural History Museum Rotterdam has observed one male mallard engage in homosexual necrophilia.

==== Penguins ====
Penguins have been observed to engage in homosexual behaviour since at least as early as 1911. George Murray Levick, who documented this behaviour in Adélie penguins at Cape Adare, described it as "depraved". The report was considered too shocking for public release at the time, and was suppressed. The only copies that were made available privately to researchers had the English text partly written in Greek letters, to prevent this knowledge becoming more widely known. The report was unearthed only a century later, and published in Polar Record in June 2012.

In early February 2004, The New York Times reported that Roy and Silo, a male pair of chinstrap penguins in the Central Park Zoo in New York City, had successfully hatched and fostered a female chick from a fertile egg they had been given to incubate. Other penguins in New York zoos have also been reported to have formed same-sex pairs.

In Odense Zoo in Denmark, a pair of male king penguins adopted an egg that had been abandoned by a female, proceeding to incubate it and raise the chick. Zoos in Japan and Germany have also documented homosexual male penguin couples. The couples have been shown to build nests together and use a stone as a substitute for an egg. Researchers at Rikkyo University in Tokyo found 20 homosexual pairs at 16 major aquariums and zoos in Japan.

The Bremerhaven Zoo in Germany attempted to encourage reproduction of endangered Humboldt penguins by importing females from Sweden and separating three male pairs, but this was unsuccessful. The zoo's director said that the relationships were "too strong" between the homosexual pairs. German gay groups protested at this attempt to break up the male-male pairs but the zoo's director was reported as saying "We don't know whether the three male pairs are really homosexual or whether they have just bonded because of a shortage of females ... nobody here wants to forcibly separate homosexual couples."

A pair of male Magellanic penguins at the San Francisco Zoo shared a burrow for six years and raised a surrogate chick; the pair split when the male of a pair in the next burrow died and the female sought a new mate.

Buddy and Pedro, a pair of male African penguins, were separated by the Toronto Zoo to mate with female penguins in 2011. Buddy has since paired off with a female.

Suki and Chupchikoni are two female African penguins that pair bonded at the Ramat Gan Safari in Israel in 2013. Chupchikoni was assumed to be male until her blood was tested.

Jumbs and Kermit, two male Humboldt penguins at Wingham Wildlife Park, were given an egg from heterosexual couple Hurricane and Isobel. The egg failed to hatch. However, they were given another abandoned egg from the same couple which successfully hatched on 12 April 2014.

As of 2018, two female King penguins at Kelly Tarltons in Auckland, New Zealand, called Thelma and Louise (named after the 1991 film) have been in a relationship for eight years, when most of the other eligible penguins switch partners each mating season, regardless of their orientation. The two penguins were both taking care of an egg that Thelma laid, but is unknown whether it was fertilized.

Sphen and Magic, two male gentoo penguins in Sea Life Sydney Aquarium, paired in 2018 and went on to raise two chicks, Lara (formerly Sphengic) and Clancy. Sphen died in 2024.

In September 2018 at Odense Zoo in Denmark, a male penguin couple took a chick from a heterosexual couple while they were swimming. Zoo staff speculated that the couple saw the biological parents as neglectful of the chick. The biological parents later confronted the couple and zoo staff returned the chick to them.

Marama and Rocky, two female gentoo penguins at Sea Life London Aquarium, had an "incredibly strong bond" for five years prior to adopting a chick who was born in June 2019. The chick was intentionally not gendered and was given a gender-neutral purple band for identification purposes. They were still a couple in 2021.

Skipper and Ping, two male penguins at Berlin Zoo, adopted an abandoned egg in July 2019.

A female penguin couple named Electra and Viola adopted, incubated and raised an egg from another couple at L'Oceanogràfic in Valencia in 2020.

A second same-sex female couple, Marmalade and Chickpea, formed at Sea Life London during the 2021 mating season.

==== Vultures ====
In 1998, two male griffon vultures named Dashik and Yehuda, at the Jerusalem Biblical Zoo, engaged in "open and energetic sex" and built a nest. The keepers provided the couple with an artificial egg, which the two parents took turns incubating, and 45 days later, the zoo replaced the egg with a baby vulture. The two male vultures raised the chick together. A few years later, however, Yehuda became interested in a female vulture that was brought into the aviary. Dashik became depressed, and was eventually moved to the zoological research garden at Tel Aviv University where he too set up a nest with a female vulture.

Two male vultures at the Allwetter Zoo in Muenster built a nest together, although they were picked on and their nest materials were often stolen by other vultures. They were eventually separated to try to promote breeding by placing one of them with female vultures, despite the protests of German homosexual groups.

==== Pigeons ====
Both male and female pigeons sometimes exhibit homosexual behavior. In addition to sexual behavior, same-sex pigeon pairs will build nests, and hens will lay (infertile) eggs and attempt to incubate them.

=== Mammals ===
==== American bison ====
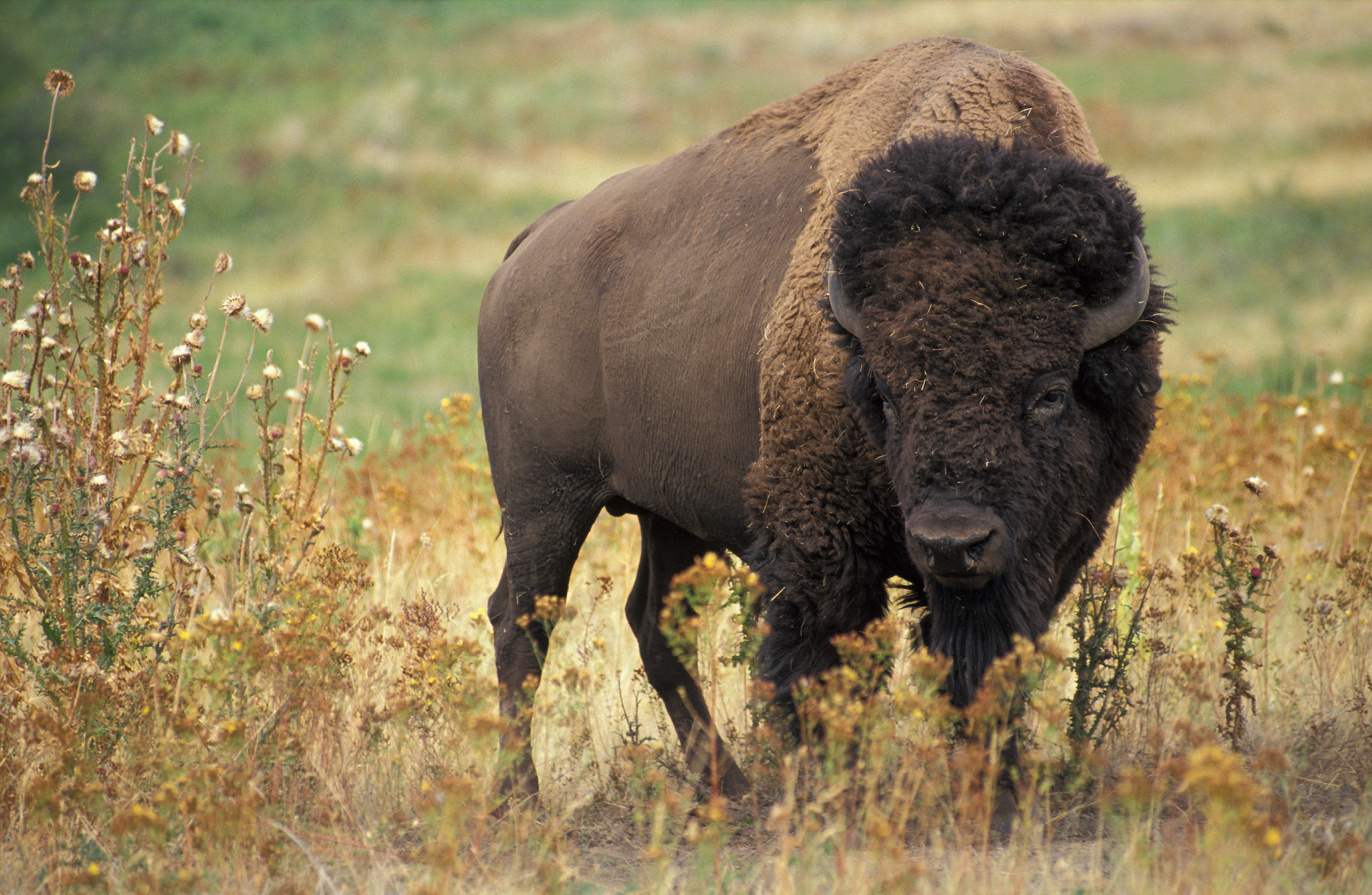
The American bison is a bovine mammal which displays homosexual behavior.

Courtship, mounting, and full anal penetration between bulls has been noted to occur among American bison. The Mandan nation Okipa festival concludes with a ceremonial enactment of this behavior, to "ensure the return of the buffalo in the coming season". Also, mounting of one female by another (known as "bulling") is extremely common among cattle. The behaviour is hormone driven and synchronizes with the emergence of estrus (heat), particularly in the presence of a bull.

==== Bats ====
Two male Bonin flying foxes (Pteropus pselaphon) performing fellatio on each other

More than 20 species of bat have been documented to engage in homosexual behavior. Bat species that have been observed engaging in homosexual behavior in the wild include:

- the grey-headed flying fox (Pteropus poliocephalus)
- the Bonin flying fox (Pteropus pselaphon)
- the Indian flying fox (Pteropus giganteus)
- Rafinesque's big-eared bat (Corynorhinus rafinesquii)
- the common bent-wing bat (Miniopterus schreibersii)
- the serotine bat (Eptesicus serotinus)
- Bechstein's bat (Myotis bechsteinii)
- the long-fingered bat (Myotis capaccinii)
- Daubenton's bat (Myotis daubentonii)
- the little brown bat (Myotis lucifugus)
- the greater mouse-eared bat (Myotis myotis)
- the whiskered bat (Myotis mystacinus)
- Natterer's bat (Myotis nattereri)
- the common noctule (Nyctalus noctula)
- Leisler's bat (Nyctalus leisleri)
- the common pipistrelle (Pipistrellus pipistrellus)
- the brown long-eared bat (Plecotus auritus)
- the barbastelle (Barbastella barbastellus)
- the greater horseshoe bat (Rhinolophus ferrumequinum)
- the lesser horseshoe bat (Rhinolophus hipposideros)

Bat species that have been observed engaging in homosexual behavior in captivity include the Comoro flying fox (Pteropus livingstonii), the Rodrigues flying fox (Pteropus rodricensis) and the common vampire bat (Desmodus rotundus).

Homosexual behavior in bats has been categorized into 6 groups: mutual homosexual grooming and licking, homosexual masturbation, homosexual play, homosexual mounting, coercive sex, and cross-species homosexual sex.

In the wild, the grey-headed flying fox (Pteropus poliocephalus) engages in allogrooming wherein one partner licks and gently bites the chest and wing membrane of the other partner. Both sexes display this form of mutual homosexual grooming and it is more common in males. Males often have erect penises while they are mutually grooming each other. Like opposite-sex grooming partners, same-sex grooming partners continuously utter a "pre-copulation call", which is described as a "pulsed grating call", while engaged in this activity.

In wild Bonin flying foxes (Pteropus pselaphon), males perform fellatio or 'male-male genital licking' on other males. Male–male genital licking events occur repeatedly several times in the same pair, and reciprocal genital licking also occurs. The male-male genital licking in these bats is considered a sexual behavior. Allogrooming in Bonin flying foxes has never been observed, hence the male-male genital licking in this species does not seem to be a byproduct of allogrooming, but rather a behavior of directly licking the male genital area, independent of allogrooming. In captivity, same-sex genital licking has been observed among males of the Comoro flying fox (Pteropus livingstonii) as well as among males of the common vampire bat (Desmodus rotundus).

In wild Indian flying foxes (Pteropus giganteus), males often mount one another, with erections and thrusting, while play-wrestling. One observation of males engaged in "homosexual fellatio" has also been recorded. Males of the long-fingered bat (Myotis capaccinii) have been observed in the same position of male-female mounting, with one gripping the back of the other. A similar behavior was also observed in the common bent-wing bat (Miniopterus schreibersii).

In wild little brown bats (Myotis lucifugus), males often mount other males (and females) during late autumn and winter, when many of the mounted individuals are torpid. 35% of matings during this period are homosexual. These coercive copulations usually include ejaculation and the mounted bat often makes a typical copulation call consisting of a long squawk. Similarly, in hibernacula of the common noctule (Nyctalus noctula), active males were observed to wake up from lethargy on a warm day and engage in mating with lethargic males and (active or lethargic) females. The lethargic males, like females, called out loudly and presented their buccal glands with opened mouth during copulation.

Vesey-Fitzgerald (1949) observed homosexual behaviours in all 12 British bat species known at the time: "Homosexuality is common in the spring in all species, and, since the males are in full possession of their powers, I suspect throughout the summer...I have even seen homosexuality between Natterer's and Daubenton's bats (Myotis nattereri and M. daubentonii)."

==== Cetaceans ====
===== Amazon dolphins =====
The Amazon river dolphin or boto has been reported to form up in bands of 3–5 individuals engaging in sexual activity. The groups usually comprise young males and sometimes one or two females. Sex is often performed in non-reproductive ways, using snout, flippers and genital rubbing, without regard to gender. In captivity, they have been observed to sometimes perform homosexual and heterosexual penetration of the blowhole, a hole homologous with the nostril of other mammals, making this the only known example of nasal sex in the animal kingdom. The males will sometimes also perform sex with males from the tucuxi species, a type of small porpoise.

===== Bottlenose dolphins =====
Dolphins of several species engage in homosexual acts, though it is best studied in the bottlenose dolphins. Sexual encounters between females take the shape of "beak-genital propulsion", where one female inserts her beak in the genital opening of the other while swimming gently forward. Between males, homosexual behaviour includes rubbing of genitals against each other, which sometimes leads to the males swimming belly to belly, inserting the penis in the other's genital slit and sometimes anus.

Janet Mann, Georgetown University professor of biology and psychology, argues that the strong personal behavior among male dolphin calves is about bond formation and benefits the species in an evolutionary context. She cites studies showing that these dolphins later in life as adults are in a sense bisexual, and the male bonds forged earlier in life work together for protection as well as locating females to reproduce with. Confrontations between flocks of bottlenose dolphins and the related species Atlantic spotted dolphin will sometimes lead to cross-species homosexual behaviour between the males rather than combat.

===== Humpback whales =====
In 2022, photographers captured the first-ever images of humpback whales mating, both of which were males, off the coast of Maui, Hawaii. The whales were observed for 30 minutes, with one whale using its penis to penetrate the genital slit of the other.

===== Southern right whales =====
During the 2024 whale spotting season, photographers off the coast of Maldonado in Uruguay recorded a total of four events of non-reproductive sexual activity amongst male southern right whales, which make up the first audiovisual record in which penetration of the genital slit occurs between adult males. The situations in which these interactions occurred were varied and mostly involved groups of three male right whales.

==== Elephants ====
African and Asian male elephants will engage in same-sex bonding and mounting. Such encounters are often associated with affectionate interactions, such as kissing, trunk intertwining, and placing trunks in each other's mouths. Male elephants, who often live apart from the general herd, often form "companionships", consisting of an older individual and one or sometimes two younger males with sexual behavior being an important part of the social dynamic. Unlike heterosexual relations, which are always of a fleeting nature, the relationships between males may last for years. The encounters are analogous to heterosexual bouts, one male often extending his trunk along the other's back and pushing forward with his tusks to signify his intention to mount. Same-sex relations are common and frequent in both sexes, with Asiatic elephants in captivity devoting roughly 45% of sexual encounters to same-sex activity.

==== Giraffes ====
Male giraffes have been observed to engage in remarkably high frequencies of homosexual behavior. After aggressive "necking", it is common for two male giraffes to caress and court each other, leading up to mounting and climax. Such interactions between males have been found to be more frequent than heterosexual coupling. In one study, up to 94% of observed mounting incidents took place between two males. The proportion of same sex activities varied between 30 and 75%, and at any given time one in twenty males were engaged in non-combative necking behavior with another male. Only 1% of same-sex mounting incidents occurred between females.

==== Marmots ====
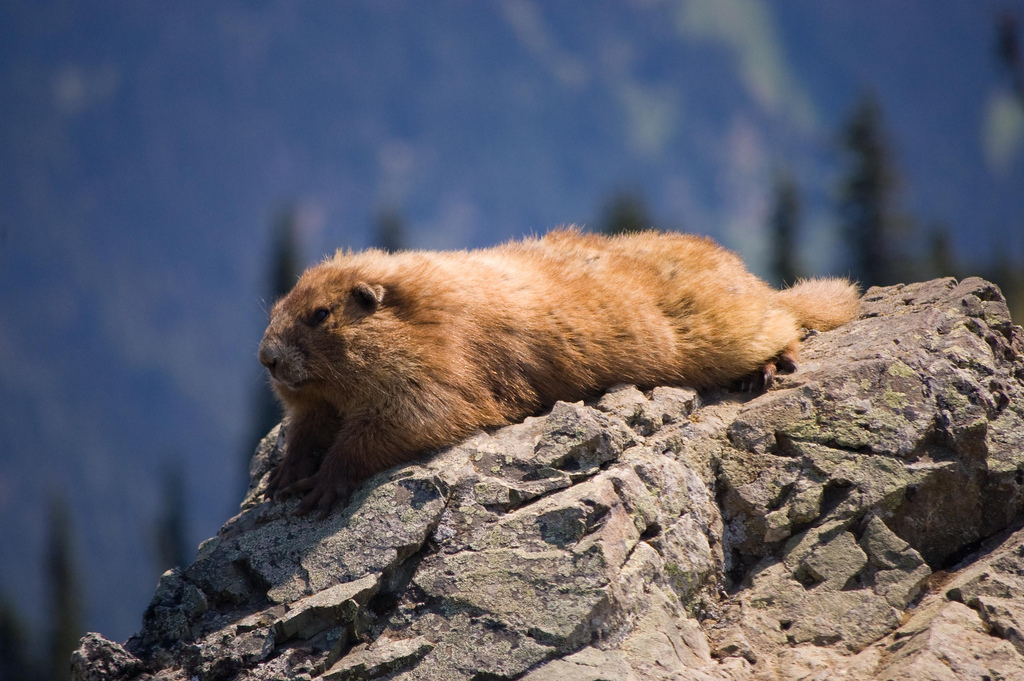
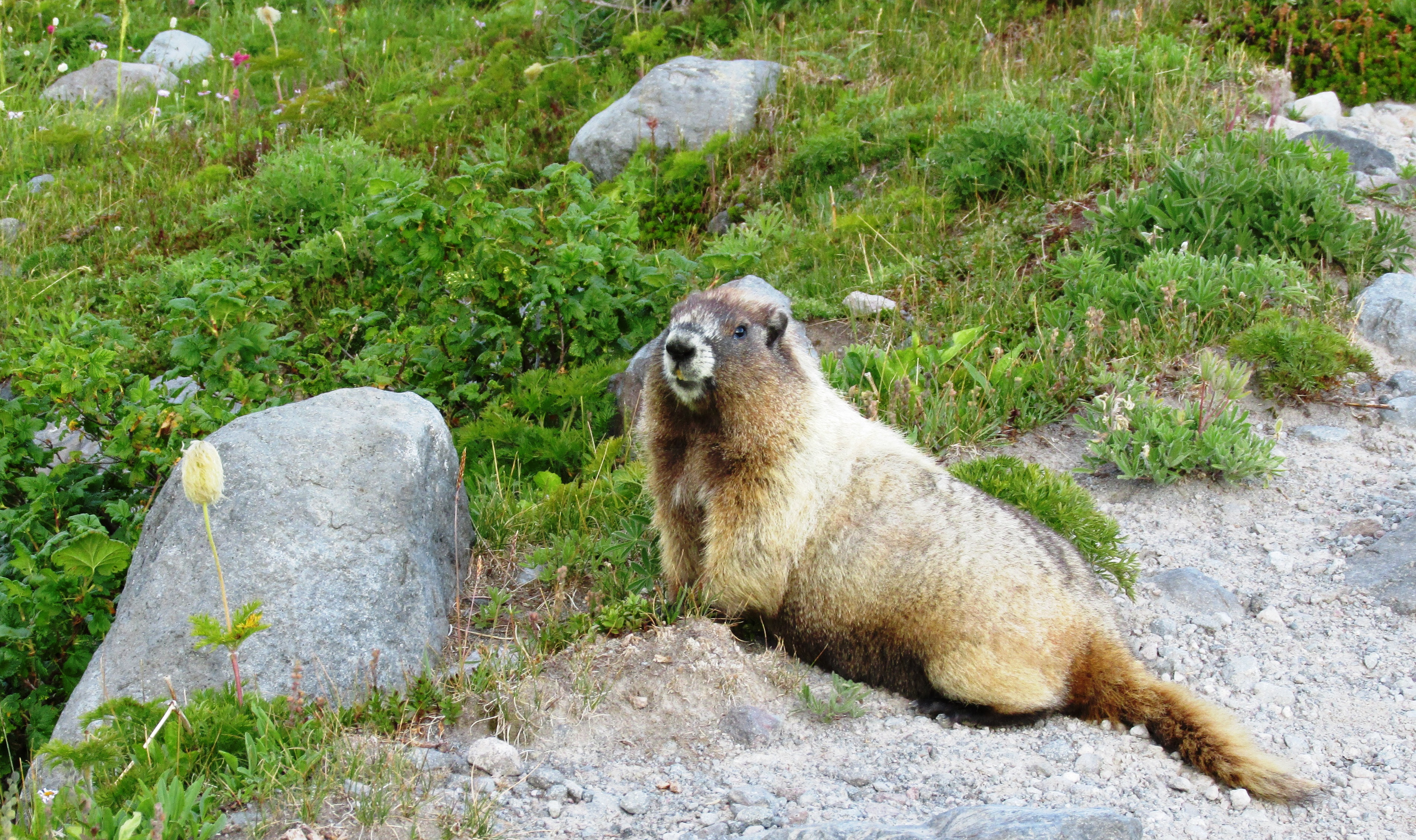
Olympic marmot (left) and hoary marmot (right)

Homosexual behavior is quite common in wild marmots. In Olympic marmots (Marmota olympus) and hoary marmots (Marmota caligata), females often mount other females as well as engage in other affectionate and sexual behaviors with females of the same species. They display a high frequency of these behaviors especially when they are in heat. A homosexual encounter often begins with a greeting interaction in which one female nuzzles her nose on the other female's cheek or mouth, or both females touch noses or mouths. Additionally, a female may gently chew on the ear or neck of her partner, who responds by raising her tail. The first female may sniff the other's genital region or nuzzle that region with her mouth. She may then proceed to mount the other female, during which the mounting female gently grasps the mounted female's dorsal neck fur in her jaws while thrusting. The mounted female arches her back and holds her tail to one side to facilitate their sexual interaction.

==== Lions ====
Male lions mating

Both male and female lions have been seen to interact homosexually. Male lions pair-bond for a number of days and initiate homosexual activity with affectionate nuzzling and caressing, leading to mounting and thrusting. About 8% of mountings have been observed to occur with other males. Pairings between females are held to be fairly common in captivity but have not been observed in the wild.

==== Polecats ====
European polecats (Mustela putorius) were found to engage homosexually with non-sibling animals. Exclusive homosexuality with mounting and anal penetration in this solitary species serves no apparent adaptive function.

==== Primates ====
Same-sex sexual behaviors have been observed in New World monkeys, Old World monkeys, and apes. These behaviors are much more common in Old World monkeys than New World monkeys, and all ape genera have been observed engaging in same-sex sexual behavior. Prosimians have not been observed engaging in same-sex sexual behavior. Same-sex mounting, for instance, has been observed in 16% of New World primate genera. In contrast, 76% of Old World monkey genera contain at least one species that has been observed in male-male mounts, and 70% of genera for female-female mounts. Same-sex mounting has been observed in all ape genera. Same-sex sexual behaviors likely evolved following the divergence of New World monkeys; these behaviors are a conserved trait among Old World monkeys and apes. Among Old World monkeys, same-sex genital interactions are much more common in multi-male systems as opposed to uni-male systems.

===== Bonobos =====
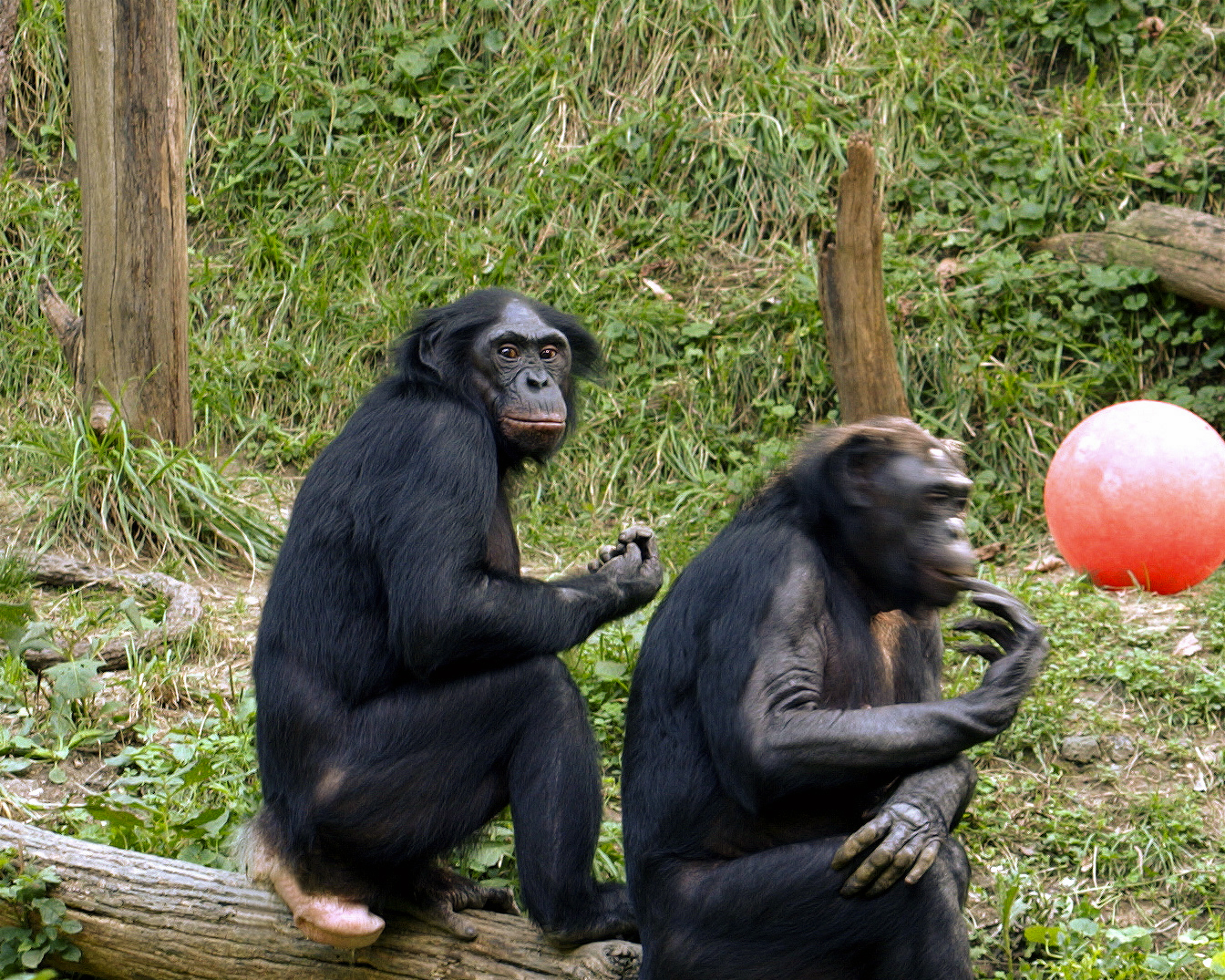
Two male bonobos

Bonobos form a matriarchal society, unusual among apes. They are fully bisexual: both males and females engage in hetero- and homosexual behavior, being noted for female–female sex in particular, including between juveniles and adults. Roughly 60% of all bonobo sexual activity occurs between two or more females. While the homosexual bonding system in bonobos represents the highest frequency of homosexuality known in any primate species, homosexuality has been reported for all great apes, as well as a number of other primate species.

Dutch primatologist Frans de Waal, who extensively observed and filmed bonobos, believed that sexual activity is the bonobo's way of avoiding conflict. Anything that arouses the interest of more than one bonobo at a time, not just food, tends to result in sexual contact. If two bonobos approach a cardboard box thrown into their enclosure, they will briefly mount each other before playing with the box. Such situations lead to squabbles in most other species. But bonobos are quite tolerant, perhaps because they use sex to divert attention and to defuse tension.

Bonobo sex often occurs in aggressive contexts totally unrelated to food. A jealous male might chase another away from a female, after which the two males reunite and engage in scrotal rubbing. Or after a female hits a juvenile, the latter's mother may lunge at the aggressor, an action that is immediately followed by genital rubbing between the two adults.

===== Chimpanzees =====
Compared to bonobos, less research has been conducted on same-sex sexual behaviors in chimpanzees (Pan troglodytes). In contrast to bonobos, same-sex sexual behaviors are less common in Kibale chimpanzees (Pan troglodytes schweinfurthii) and primarily occur between adult males. While less frequent than in female bonobos, same-sex sexual behaviors between male chimpanzees occur regularly and in a variety of contexts. Female chimpanzees are much less likely to engage in same-sex sexual behaviors than males.

===== Gibbons =====
There is one published study of same-sex sexual behavior in white-handed gibbons (Hylobates lar). The authors report on observations of an adult male mounting an adolescent male. In gibbons, same-sex sexual behavior is likely rare.

===== Gorillas =====
Both male and female mountain gorillas (Gorilla gorilla beringei) have been observed engaging in same-sex sexual behaviors. Homosexual behavior among male gorillas has been studied. This behavior occurs more often in all-male bachelor packs in the wild and it is believed to play a role in social bonding. Homosexual behavior among female mountain gorillas has also been documented. Among all-male "bachelor" groups, same-sex sexual interactions are extremely common. Female mountain gorillas engage in same-sex sexual behaviors frequently as well and coincided in prevalence in accordance with intersexual copulations as well. As opposed to conferring social status, same-sex sexual behaviors are likely reflective of elevated arousal in female mountain gorillas. Same-sex sexual behaviors are natural and common among mountain gorillas.

===== Orangutans =====
Homosexual behavior forms part of the natural repertoire of sexual or sociosexual behavior of orangutans. Male homosexual behavior occurs both in the wild and in captivity, and it occurs in both adolescent and mature individuals. Homosexual behavior in orangutans is not an artifact of captivity or contact with humans.

Sociosexual behaviors among orangutans (Pongo spp.) are extremely common and invoke a variety of evolutionary strategies. However, only one study of same-sex sexual behavior has been published. In Sumatran orangutans (Pongo abelii), same-sex sexual behavior has been documented among two dyads of unflanged adolescent males. Oral contact with genitals and behavior similar to male-female forced copulation between sexually mature sub-adult males were observed. These behaviors were observed without captivity or contact with humans being involved. The observation of male orangutan sexual behavior was reported as a natural repertoire of sexual or sociosexual behavior and was not found to be rare or uncommon.

===== Monkeys =====
Among monkeys, Lionel Tiger and Robin Fox conducted a study on how Depo-Provera contraceptives lead to decreased male attraction to females. Many monkeys were observed exhibiting same-sex sexual behavior.

With the Japanese macaque, also known as the "snow monkey", same-sex relations are frequent, though rates vary between troops. Females will form "consortships" characterized by affectionate social and sexual activities. In some troops up to one quarter of the females form such bonds, which vary in duration from a few days to a few weeks. Often, strong and lasting friendships result from such pairings. Males also have same-sex relations, typically with multiple partners of the same age. Affectionate and playful activities are associated with such relations.

Male same-sex behavior has been found to be common in a colony of the Rhesus macaque. It seems to be involved in social bonding, with individual differences in such behavior found to be heritable.

==== Sheep ====
Ovis aries, the common domesticated sheep, has attracted much attention due to the fact that around 8–10% of rams have an exclusive homosexual orientation. Such rams prefer to court and mount other rams only, even in the presence of estrous ewes. Moreover, around 18–22% of rams are bisexual.

Several observations indicate that male–male sexual preference in rams is sexually motivated. Rams routinely perform the same courtship behaviors (including foreleg kicks, nudges, vocalizations, anogenital sniffs and flehmen) prior to mounting other males as observed when other rams court and mount estrous females. Furthermore, pelvic thrusting and ejaculation often accompany same-sex mounts by rams.

==== Spotted hyenas ====
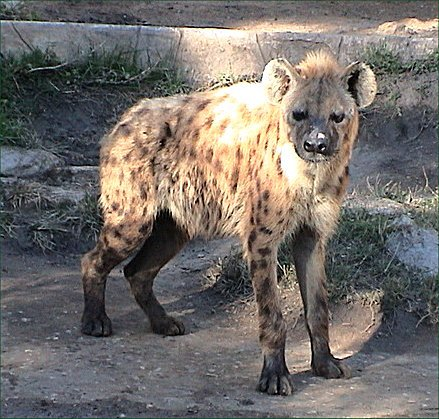
The spotted hyena is a moderately large, terrestrial carnivore native to Africa.

The family structure of the spotted hyena is matriarchal, and dominance relationships with strong sexual elements are routinely observed between related females. Due largely to the female spotted hyena's unique urogenital system, which looks more like a penis rather than a vagina, early naturalists thought hyenas were hermaphroditic males who commonly practiced homosexuality. Early writings such as Ovid's Metamorphoses and the Physiologus suggested that the hyena continually changed its sex and nature from male to female and back again. In Paedagogus, Clement of Alexandria noted that the hyena (along with the hare) was "quite obsessed with sexual intercourse". Many Europeans associated the hyena with sexual deformity, prostitution, deviant sexual behavior, and even witchcraft.

The reality behind the confusing reports is the sexually aggressive behavior between the females, including mounting between females. Research has shown that "in contrast to most other female mammals, female Crocuta are male-like in appearance, larger than males, and substantially more aggressive," and they have "been masculinized without being defeminized".

Study of this unique genitalia and aggressive behavior in the female hyena has led to the understanding that more aggressive females are better able to compete for resources, including food and mating partners. Research has shown that "elevated levels of testosterone in utero" contribute to extra aggressiveness; both males and females mount members of both the same and opposite sex, who in turn are possibly acting more submissive because of lower levels of testosterone in utero.

=== Reptiles ===
==== Lizards ====
Several species of whiptail lizard (especially in the genus Aspidoscelis) consist only of females that have the ability to reproduce through parthenogenesis. Females engage in sexual behavior to stimulate ovulation, with their behavior following their hormonal cycles; during low levels of estrogen, these (female) lizards engage in "masculine" sexual roles. Those animals with currently high estrogen levels assume "feminine" sexual roles. Some parthenogenetic lizards that perform the courtship ritual have greater fertility than those kept in isolation due to an increase in hormones triggered by the sexual behaviors. So, even though asexual whiptail lizards populations lack males, sexual stimuli still increase reproductive success. From an evolutionary standpoint, these females are passing their full genetic code to all of their offspring (rather than the 50% of genes that would be passed in sexual reproduction). Certain species of gecko also reproduce by parthenogenesis.

Some species of sexually reproducing geckos have also been found to display homosexual behavior, e.g. the day geckos Phelsuma laticauda and Phelsuma cepediana.

==== Tortoises ====
Jonathan, the world's oldest tortoise (an Aldabra giant tortoise), had been mating with another tortoise named Frederica since 1991. In 2017, it was discovered that Frederica was actually probably male all along, and was renamed Frederic.

=== Insects and arachnids ===
There is evidence of same-sex sexual behavior in at least 110 species of insects and arachnids. Scharf et al. says: "Males are more frequently involved in same-sex sexual (SSS) behavior in the laboratory than in the field, and isolation, high density, and exposure to female pheromones increase its prevalence. SSS behavior is often shorter than the equivalent heterosexual behavior. Most cases can be explained via mistaken identification by the active (courting/mounting) male. Passive males often resist courting/mating attempts".

Scharf et al. continues: "SSS behavior has been reported in most insect orders, and Bagemihl (1999) provides a list of ~100 species of insects demonstrating such behavior. Yet, this list lacks detailed descriptions, and a more comprehensive summary of its prevalence in invertebrates, as well as ethology, causes, implications, and evolution of this behavior, remains lacking".

==== Dragonflies ====
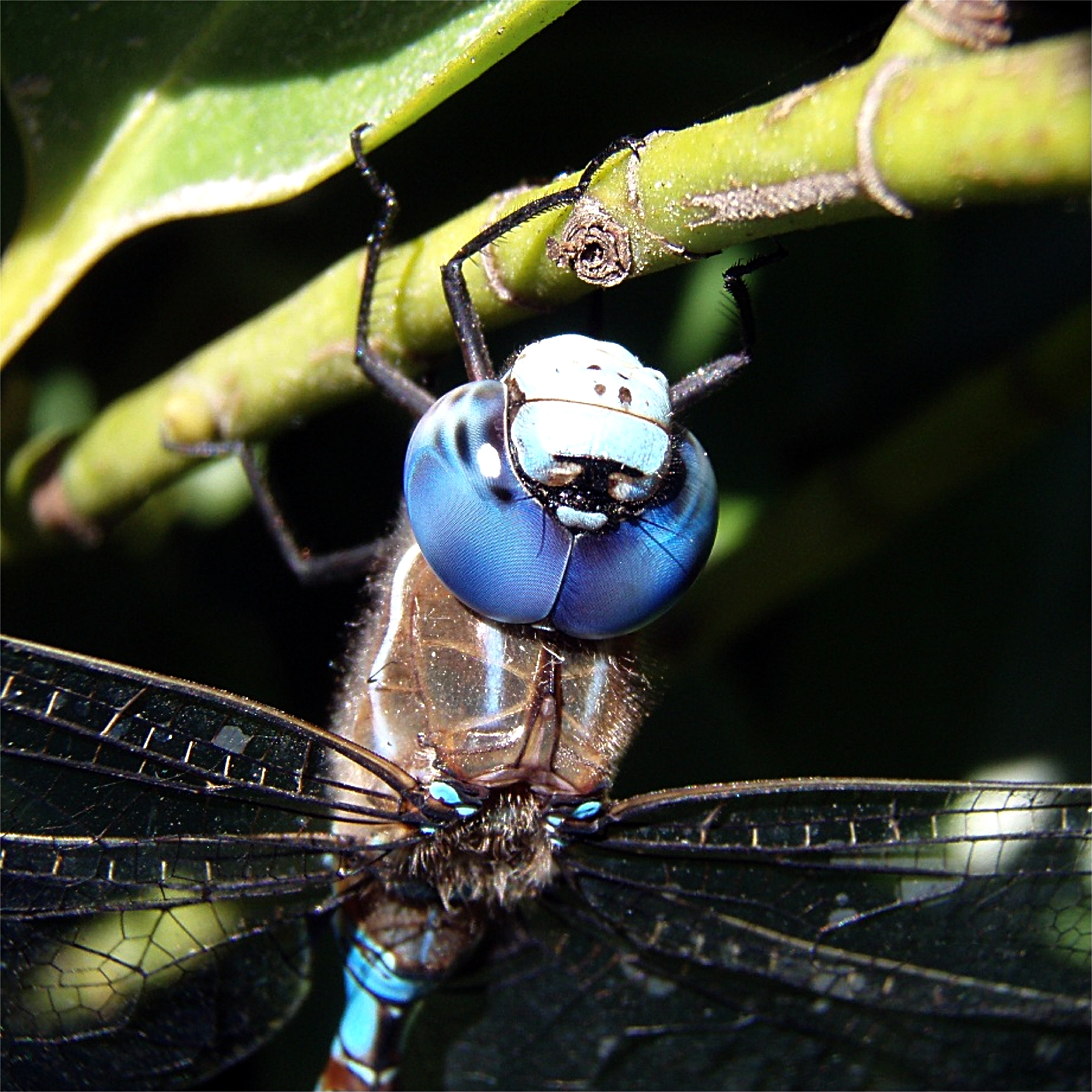
The head of darner dragonfly (Basiaeschna janata)

Male homosexuality has been inferred in several species of dragonflies (the order Odonata). The cloacal pinchers of male damselflies and dragonflies inflict characteristic head damage to females during sex. A survey of 11 species of damsel and dragonflies has revealed such mating damages in 20 to 80% of the males too, indicating a fairly high occurrence of sexual coupling between males.

==== Fruit flies ====
Male Drosophila melanogaster flies bearing two copies of a mutant allele in the fruitless gene court and attempt to mate exclusively with other males. The genetic basis of animal homosexuality has been studied in the fly D. melanogaster. Here, multiple genes have been identified that can cause homosexual courtship and mating. These genes are thought to control behavior through pheromones as well as altering the structure of the animal's brains. These studies have also investigated the influence of environment on the likelihood of flies displaying homosexual behavior.

==== Bed bugs ====
Male bed bugs (Cimex lectularius) are sexually attracted to any newly fed individual and this results in homosexual mounting. This occurs in heterosexual mounting by the traumatic insemination in which the male pierces the female abdomen with his needle-like penis. In homosexual mating this risks abdominal injuries as males lack the female counteradaptive spermalege structure. Males produce alarm pheromones to reduce such homosexual mating.

== See also ==
- Against Nature? – Norwegian exhibition on homosexuality in animals
- Biology and sexual orientation
- Freemartin – Infertile cow with XX/XY chromosomes
- Hermaphrodite § Animals
- Homosexuality and psychology
- List of animals displaying homosexual behavior
- Non-reproductive sexual behavior in animals
- Norms of reaction – Aspect of gene expression
- Queer Planet – 2023 nature documentary
- Sequential hermaphroditism – Sex change as part of the normal life cycle of a species
- Timeline of sexual orientation and medicine
- Xq28 – Genetic marker at the lower tip of human X chromosome
