= Queer Planet =

2023 nature documentary

- Directed by: Ed Watkins
- Narrated by: Andrew Rannells, Sue Perkins
- Edited by: Sophia Evans, Marsden Murison
- Music by: Jasha Klebe
- Distributed by: Peacock
- Release dates: June 9, 2023 (Canada); June 6, 2024
- Running time: 90 minutes
- Country: United States
- Language: English

Queer Planet is a 2023 nature television documentary about LGBT behavior in animals, directed and produced by Ed Watkins. The documentary is narrated by actor Andrew Rannells.

== Content ==
The documentary is split into several parts. It talks about some of the animal species which exhibit LGBT behavior, particularly homosexuality and bisexuality, including lions, giraffes, and clownfish.

== Reception ==
The film was generally received well by critics, with a particular emphasis on the series' wit and use of humor. Matthew Rozsa of Salon.com wrote, "Queerness is everywhere in nature, despite claims to the contrary, and 'Queer Planet' underlines that sexual diversity isn't an anomaly. It's worth celebrating."

However, the series received criticism from conservative political commentators, including Tomi Lahren, who claimed "If animals were indeed gay, there would be no more animals. Just basic science there."
