= Joaquín Cortés =

Spanish dancer

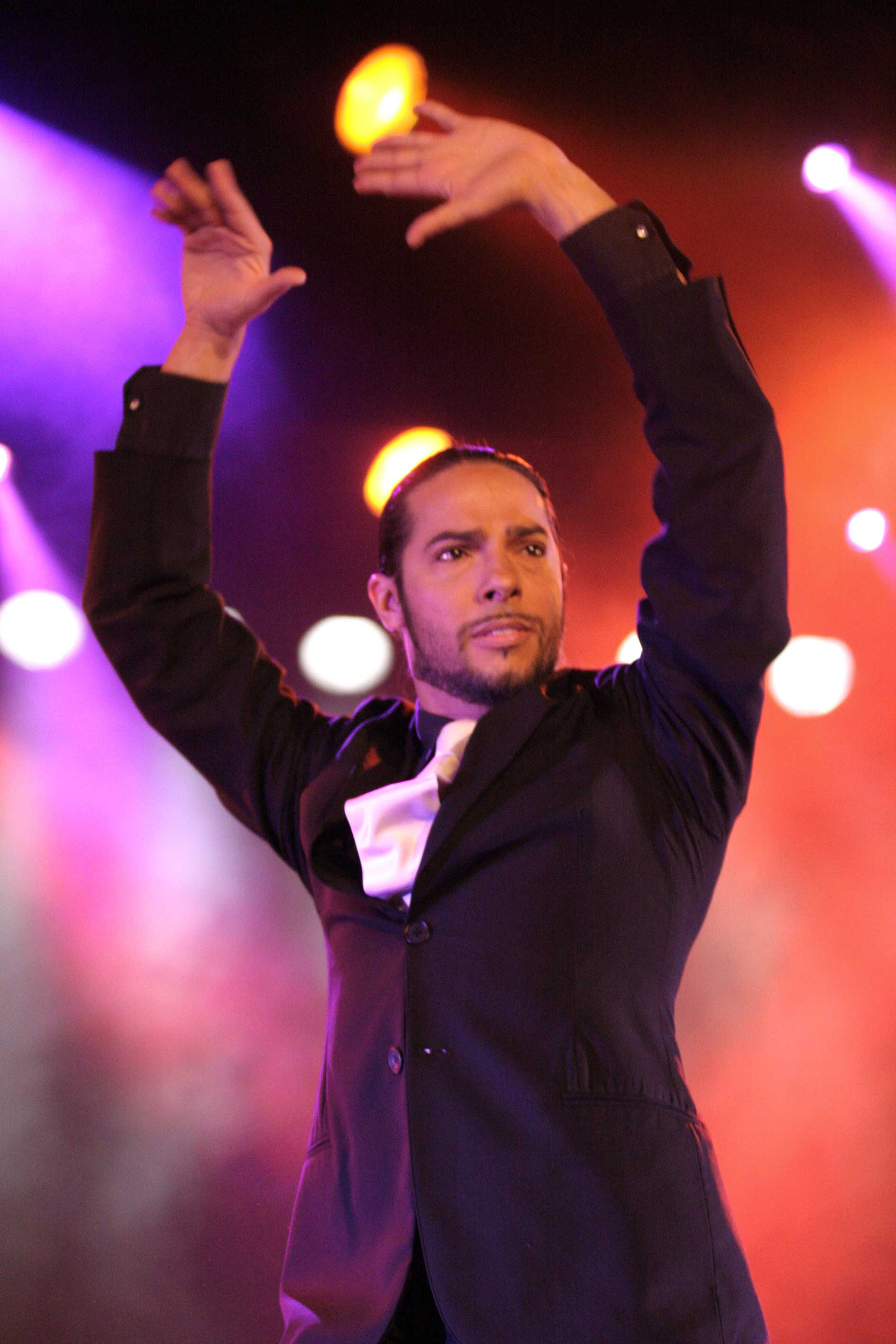
- Born: Joaquín Pedraja Reyes; 1969 (age 56–57); Córdoba, Spain
- Occupations: Flamenco dancer, Ballet and Contemporaneo dancer
- Years active: 1995–present
- Height: 1.85 m (6 ft 1 in)
- Partner: Mónica Moreno
- Parent: Basilia Reyes Flores

Joaquín Pedraja Reyes (known professionally as Joaquín Cortés; born 1969) is a Spanish classically trained ballet and flamenco dancer.

== Biography ==
Cortés was born to a Gitano family in Córdoba and showed interest in dancing from an early age. Cortés and his family moved to Madrid in 1981. Soon after moving to Madrid, he began to take formal dancing lessons and study seriously.

In 1984, he was accepted as a member of the prestigious Spanish national ballet company. He travelled the world with the Spanish National Ballet, performing in important venues such as the Metropolitan Opera House (Lincoln Center) of New York and the Kremlin Palace in Moscow. During his stint with the Spanish National Ballet, he also became a principal solo performer known for his phenomenal stamina and athleticism.

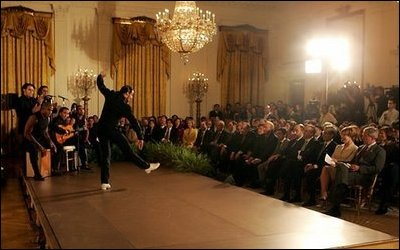
Former U.S. President George W. Bush and Laura Bush watch the performance of Joaquin Cortes as he dances to a quintet of Flamenco musicians during a Hispanic Heritage Month celebration in the East Room of the White House on 15 September 2004.

Desiring more creative control, Cortés formed the Joaquín Cortés Flamenco Ballet company and launched his first international tour 'Cibayí', with other artists such as Antón Jiménez as guitarist, in 1992. The formation of Cortés' own company allowed him to diverge from purist ballet and create his own fusion of flamenco, ballet and modern dance. In 1995, in addition to being featured in two international films- 'La flor de mi secreto' (The Flower of My Secret) and Carlos Saura's 'Flamenco', Joaquín Cortés embarked on what is often considered his most successful venture, 'Pasión Gitana' (Gypsy Passion). 'Pasión Gitana' marked the beginning of Cortés' recognition for not only his prowess as a dancer, but also as a choreographer and artistic director. In 1999, Cortés was the subject of a documentary film and he launched a successful tour of 'Soul' across North and South America. In the 1990s, Joaquín Cortés gained notoriety for his close relationships with high-profile celebrities such as Naomi Campbell, Giorgio Armani and Mira Sorvino.

Continuing into the millennium, Cortés' focus shifted from dancing to choreography and artistic direction. He continues to dance in a limited capacity live on stage, in film and on television. In 2000, landed a role in the film 'Gitano' (Gypsy) and again in 2004 in 'Vaniglia e cioccolato' (Vanilla and Chocolate). In 2001, he also made a guest appearance on Jennifer Lopez's concert in Puerto Rico. In 2004, Cortés was involved in the international tour of 'De Amor y Odio' that took him to England, Portugal, Thailand and New York, among other places. 2007 marked the beginning of Joaquín Cortés' most recent spectacle, 'Mi Soledad.' On 15 May 2007, he performed as a guest dancer in a high-profile semi-final segment on ABC's "Dancing with the Stars."

Cortes is also the visual inspiration for the character Vamp from the Metal Gear video game series.

== Shows ==
- Cibayí
- Pasión Gitana
- Soul
- Live
- De Amor y Odio
- Mi Soledad
- Unleashed (2009)
- Esencia (2017)

== Filmography ==
- La flor de mi secreto (1995) — Antonio
- Flamenco (1995) — himself
- Gitano (2000) — Andres Heredia
- Vaniglia e Cioccolato (2004) — Carlos
- Mask Singer: Adivina quién canta (2021) - Erizo/Winner

== See also ==
- List of dancers
