= Alien 2: On Earth =

1980 Italian science fiction film

- Italian theatrical poster
- Directed by: Ciro Ippolito; Biagio Proietti
- Screenplay by: Ciro Ippolito
- Story by: Ciro Ippolito
- Produced by: Ciro Ippolito; Angiolo Stella
- Starring: Belinda Mayne; Mark Bodin; Roberto Barrese; Benny Aldrich; Michele Soavi; Judy Perrin; Don Parkinson; Claudio Falanga
- Cinematography: Silvio Fraschetti
- Edited by: Carlo Broglio
- Music by: Guido De Angelis; Maurizio De Angelis
- Production company: G.P.S.
- Distributed by: Impegno Cinematografico
- Release date: 8 April 1980 (Rome)
- Running time: 92 minutes
- Country: Italy

Alien 2: On Earth (Italian: Alien 2 sulla Terra) is a 1980 Italian science fiction horror film directed by Ciro Ippolito and Biagio Proietti.

== Plot ==
As the world awaits the return of a crew of astronauts from a deep space mission, a young woman named Thelma Joyce appears on a television talk show to discuss caves. Soon after her interview begins, Thelma has a horrible psychic vision. After the spacecraft returns to Earth missing its occupants, a girl on a beach discovers a weird, blue, pulsating rock. Her mother soon finds her with her face ripped off.

Thelma and her husband Roy meet up with their friends for a trip to explore a cave. The group stops at a roadside café to buy food and change into their caving gear. Thelma's friend Burt discovers a blue rock that he decides to keep in his pack.

The group arrives at the cave, and quickly rappels to the bottom to set up camp for the night. Before falling asleep, Thelma tells Roy that she feels that something horrible is about to happen, but Roy calms her down.

The next day, Thelma's friend Jill discovers the blue rock that Burt found appears to be pulsating. The rock opens up and a creature attacks her face. Thelma witnesses the attack and panics. Roy calms her down, then decides to go find Jill's body.

Roy rappels down into a hole and finds Jill, alive and with her face intact. The rest of the group rappels down the hole as well and they strap Jill to a lifter so that she may be lifted out of the hole. Jill is set aside, by herself, still unconscious. While the group prepares to climb out of the hole, a creature erupts from Jill's face and attacks Ron's neck. Ron is dragged upside down as the creature slices his neck repeatedly until his head falls off.

The group retreats though they are forced to initially go back to retrieve their equipment. The group splits up into teams to search for a way out, but to no avail. During the search Thelma reflects on what is happening and wonders if the disappearance of the astronauts is connected. Maurine stumbles upon what seems like a living wall, which drags her into it and subsequently kills her and Burt who tries to save her. Roy hurts his ankle and is forced to sit and rest. Cliff opts to go and locate Burt and Maurine while the others rest. Thelma telepathically warns Cliff of a nearby alien after their radio goes dead, though Cliff is killed by the alien. Thelma and the others find Cliff who is actually an alien in disguise. Thelma uses her abilities to explode the imposter's head revealing the alien. The alien attacks the other member of the group while Thelma and Roy outrun the alien and escape the caves. On their way back to the city, they discover a police car, but no police officers are in sight. They stop at the roadside café again, but no one is there. Roy tries to call for help on a payphone, but no operator is available. They get back into the car and continue to drive to the city.

Thelma and Roy finally get back to the city, but strangely, they cannot find anyone. They stop at the bowling alley that was seen earlier in the film, only to find that it is also empty. Roy goes to the back, only to be killed by an alien waiting there. The alien chases Thelma through the bowling alley, until she dodges an attack from it and escapes. Thelma runs through the empty city streets, calling for help but getting no answer. She finally stops yelling and sits down in an intersection. Suddenly, text shoots at the screen, warning the audience "You may be next!", implying that the aliens have taken over Earth.

== Cast ==
- Belinda Mayne as Thelma Joyce
- Mark Bodin as Roy
- Benedetta Fantoli as Maurine
- Michele Soavi as Burt
- Roberto Barresse as Cliff
- Valeria Perilli as Jill
- Donald Hodson as Mr. Raymond
- Ciro Ippolito as Joe

== Production ==
The idea for the film came to director Ciro Ippolito after he noticed a poster for Zombi 2 (1979) in Rome. Zombi 2 had been released in Italy where it performed well at the box office. While Zombi 2 was presented as a sequel to Dawn of the Dead (1978), Ippolito decided to do a similar move and make a fake sequel film titled Alien 2 to audiences in the wake of the popularity of the film Alien (1979). In the Italian film industry, unofficial sequels were common, such as the many spaghetti western films that were renamed or marketed as sequels to films like Django (1966).

Parts of the film were shot in the Castellana Caves in Apulia.

The film features a score by Guido De Angelis and Maurizio De Angelis, performed by the composers under the pseudonym Oliver Onions.

== Release ==
Ippolito said that Alien 2 would be ready for release by January 1980. 'Alien 2: On Earth was distributed in Italy by Impegno Cinematografico. It was released in Rome on April 8, 1980.

Alien 2: On Earth was released on blu-ray by Midnight Legacy in 2011. It was the first time the film was released in the United States.

== Critical reception ==
In Italy, a reviewer in La Stampa found that the film was decent, and described the final scene of the woman wandering through a deserted American city as the highlight.

Along with films like Inseminoid (1981), Forbidden World (1982), Xtro (1983), and Creature (1985), Alien 2: On Earth has been included in various discussions about early 1980s horror films set in outer space that have been associated with being Alien (1979) rip-offs or knock-offs. Adam Tyner of DVD Talk echoed this, it was derivative of Alien, while finding the film uneventful, calling it "one of the most boring movies I've ever had to endure.". Daryl Loomis of DVD Verdict said: "Some people will say that Alien 2: On Earth is a blatant ripoff and some will say that it's a terrible movie. All of those people are right, but given my track record, nobody should be surprised that I love it". Adam Clarke of Rue Morgue described the film as sleazy and oddly-placed with long driving sequences.

== See also ==
- List of Italian films of 1980
