= Ciro Ippolito =

Italian film director, screenwriter and producer

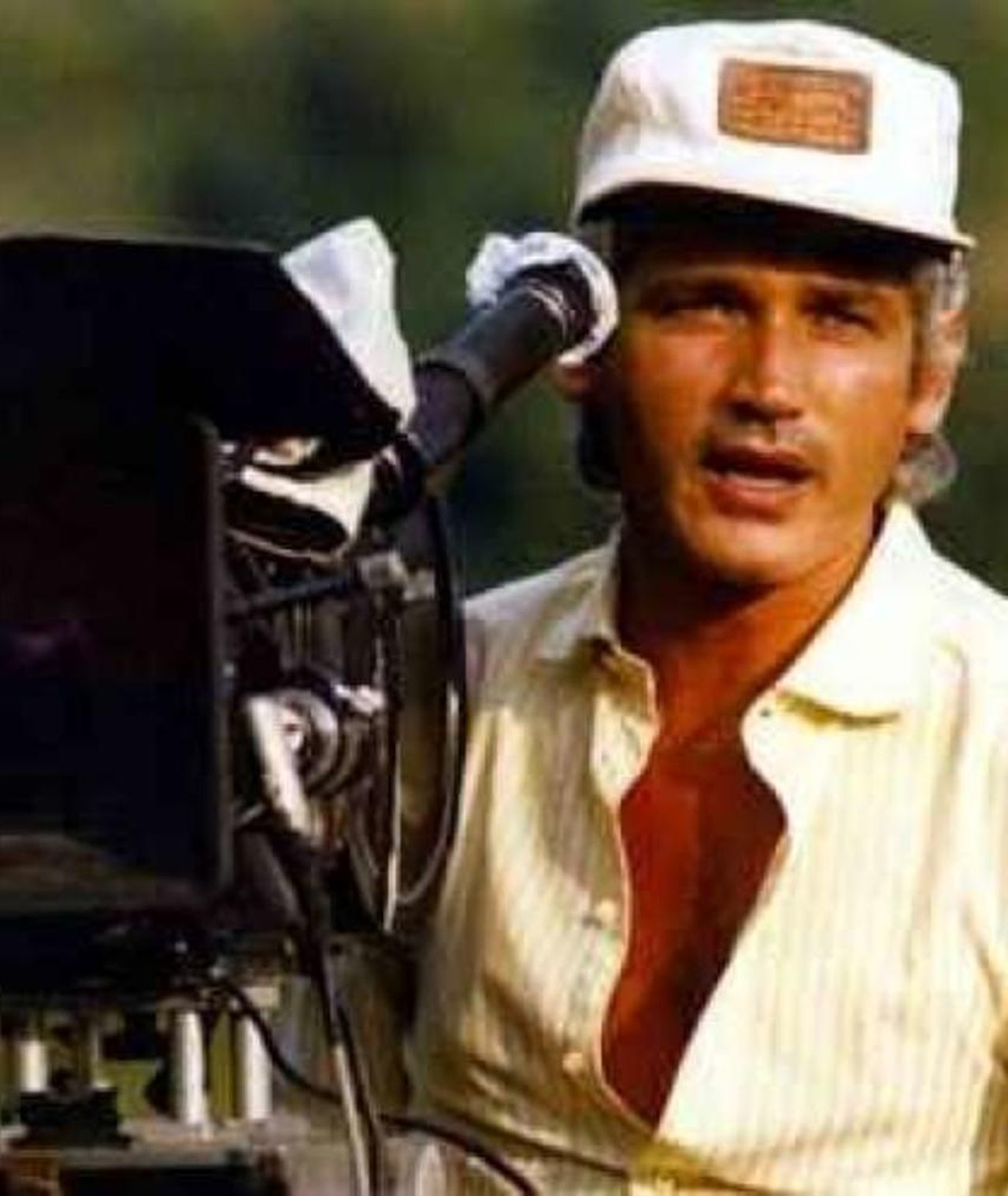
- Ciro Ippolito in the 1970s
- Born: 27 January 1947 (age 79); Naples, Italy
- Occupations: Film director, film producer
- Years active: 1960–present

Ciro Ippolito (born Naples, Italy, 27 January 1947) is an Italian film director, screenwriter and producer. He is known to horror film fans for his 1980 opus Alien 2: On Earth, which he coproduced, wrote and directed.

== Biography ==
Born in 1947 the son of an Italian theatre producer, Ciro Ippolito started his career during childhood being an actor in the film Class of Iron (Classe di ferro, 1957) by Turi Vasile.

In 1972 he participated in the film Augustine of Hippo (Agostino d'Ippona) by Roberto Rossellini, with whom he worked as assistant director. In the mid-1960s, he produced two theatre shows of Leopoldo Mastelloni (Le compagnie and Brechtomania), and participated in various films (I misteri di Napoli, La Badessa di Castro, Vieni amore mio, Flavia la monaca musulmana, La fine dell'innocenza) as actor or screenwriter.

His first work as a film director came in 1980 with the film Alien 2: On Earth (Alien 2 sulla terra), made under the pseudonym Sam Cromwell. His main successes from that period are Lacrime napolitane (Berlin Film Festival, 1980), followed by Pronto...Lucia (1982) and Zampognaro innamorato (1983), both with Carmelo Zappulla.

Arrapaho, a film about the Amerindian tribe Arapaho, was an immediate success. The film was made in a fortnight at a cost of 135 million Italian lira and recovered five billion.

Ippolito continued his activity as film producer with La venexiana (1986) directed by Mauro Bolognini and his television activity with works like La romana by Giuseppe Patroni Griffi, Gli indifferenti, miniseries by Bolognini, Disperatamente Giulia by Enrico Maria Salerno, Donna d'onore by Stuart Margolin, The Seventh Scroll (Il settimo papiro) by Kevin Condor and Il terzo segreto di Fatima by Alfredo Peyretti.

During the 1990s, he was producer for Lina Wertmüller in Io speriamo che me la cavo and Ninfa Plebea, and for Maurizio Nichetti in Palla di neve.

Ciro Ippolito's last film was Vaniglia e cioccolato / Vanilla and Chocolate (2004), an adaptation of the homonym novel of Sveva Casati Modigliani, which had a discrete success.

In 2010 Ippolito published a book entitled Un Napoletano a Hollywood.

== Filmography ==
=== Director ===
- Strangers (1974) (under the pseudonym George Spelvin)
- Alien 2: On Earth (Alien 2 sulla Terra) (1980) (under the pseudonym Sam Cromwell)
- Lacrime napoletane (1981)
- Pronto... Lucia (1982)
- Zampognaro innamorato (1983)
- Arrapaho (1984)
- Uccelli d'Italia (1984)
- Vanilla and Chocolate (Vaniglia e cioccolato) (2004)

=== Screenwriter ===
- L'Ultimo guappo (1978)
- Napoli serenata calibro 9 (1978)
- Big Mamma (Il mammasantissima) (1978)
- Lo Scugnizzo (1979)
- Napoli... la camorra sfida e la città risponde (1979)
- I contrabbandieri di Santa Lucia (1979)
- Alien 2: On Earth (Alien 2 sulla Terra) (1980) (under the pseudonym Sam Cromwell)
- Lacrime napulitane (1981)
- Zampognaro innamorato (1983)
- Arrapaho (1984)
- Snowball (Palla di neve) (1995)
- The Seventh Scroll (Il settimo papiro) (1999) (Miniseries)
- Vanilla and Chocolate (Vaniglia e cioccolato) (2004)

=== Producer ===
- Napoli serenata calibro 9 (1978)
- Big Mamma (Il mammasantissima) (1978)
- Lo Scugnizzo (1979)
- Napoli... la camorra sfida e la città risponde (1979)
- I contrabbandieri di Santa Lucia (1979)
- Alien 2: On Earth (Alien 2 sulla Terra) (1980) (executive producer under the pseudonym Sam Cromwell)
- Lacrime napulitane (1981)
- Zampognaro innamorato (1983)
- Uccelli d'Italia (1984)
- Arrapaho (1984)
- The Venetian Woman (La venexiana) (1986)
- A Time of Indifference (Gli indifferenti) (1988) (Miniseries)
- Disperatamente Giulia (1989) (Miniseries)
- Bride of Violence (Donna d'onore) (1991)
- Ciao, Professore! (Io speriamo che me la cavo) (1992)
- Snowball (Palla di neve) (1995)
- The Nymph (Ninfa plebea) (1996)
- The Seventh Scroll (Il settimo papiro) (1999) (Miniseries)
- Il terzo segreto di Fatima (2001)
- Vanilla and Chocolate (Vaniglia e cioccolato) (2004)

=== Actor ===
- Class of Iron (Classe di ferro) (1957)
- Augustine of Hippo (Agostino d'Ippona) (1972)
- La Badessa di Castro (1974)
- Flavia the Heretic (Flavia la monaca musulmana) (1974)
- Blue Belle (La fine dell'innocenza) (1976)
- Napoli... la camorra sfida e la città risponde (1979)
- Lacrime napulitane (1979)
- Arrapaho (1984)
