= Italodytes =

Scientific classification
- Domain: Eukaryota
- Kingdom: Animalia
- Phylum: Arthropoda
- Class: Insecta
- Order: Coleoptera
- Suborder: Adephaga
- Family: Carabidae
- Tribe: Clivinini
- Subtribe: Reicheiina
- Genus: Italodytes; G.Müller, 1938
- Species: I. stammeri

Binomial name
- Italodytes stammeri G.Müller, 1938

Genus of beetles

Italodytes is a genus in the ground beetle family Carabidae. This genus has a single species, Italodytes stammeri. It is found in Italy.
