= Sveva Casati Modignani =

Italian author

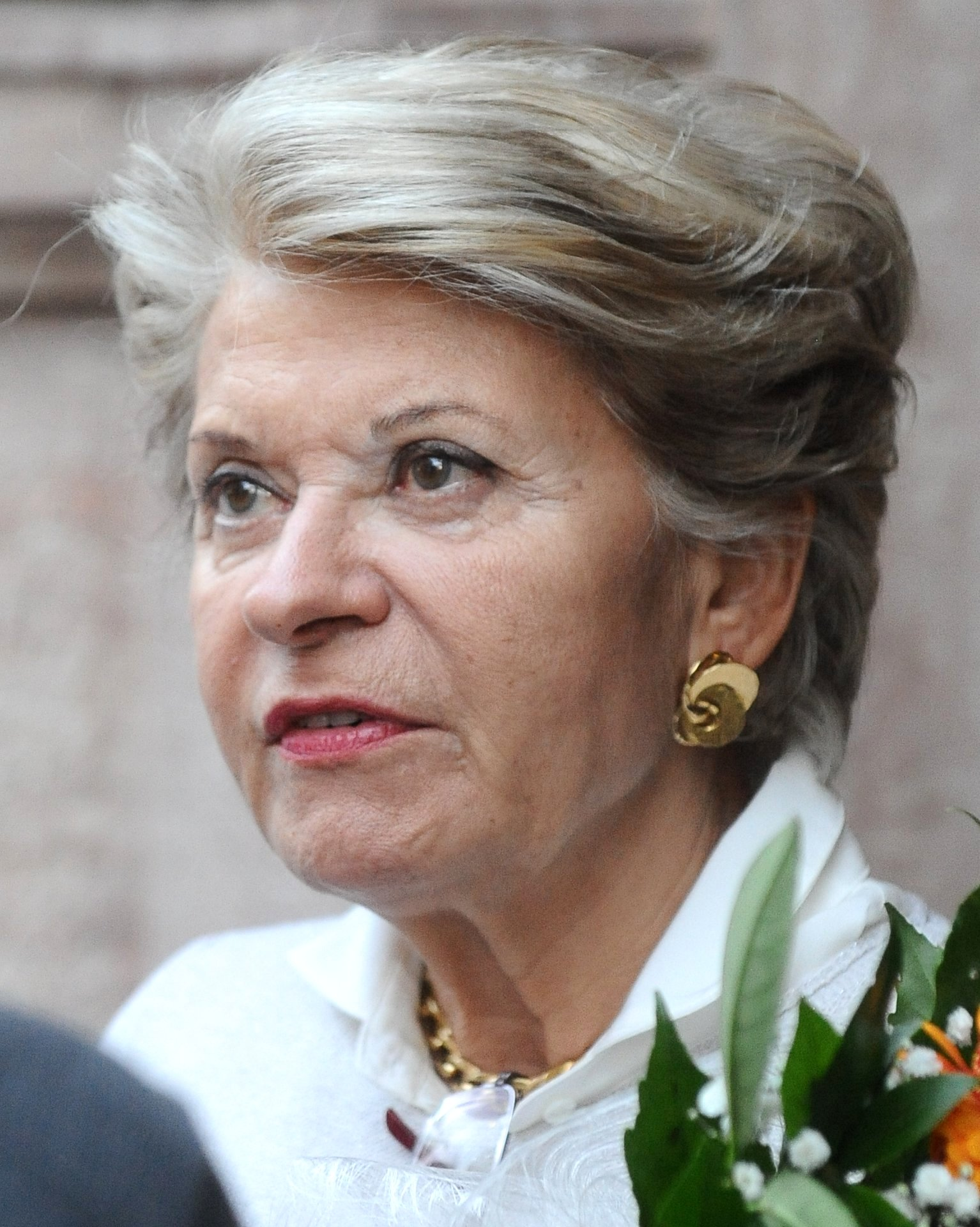
- Born: Bice Cairati; July 13, 1938; Milan, Italy

Sveva Casati Modignani is the pseudonym of Italian author Bice Cairati (born July 13, 1938). For her first three books the pseudonym was shared by her late husband, Nullo Cantaroni (August 27, 1928 – December 29, 2004). She has sold over 12 million books in Italy and is one of the country's most popular authors. Even though she has been published in 20+ countries, her work is not yet widely available in English, although at least one book, Mister Gregory, has been translated.
