= Same-sex sexual practices =

Same-sex sexual practices are sexual practices involving people of the same sex, regardless of sexual orientations.

== Sexual practices between women ==
Sexual practices between women are sexual activities involving women, regardless of their sexual orientation. These may include, for example, oral sex, mutual masturbation, tribadism, and anal sex. In medicine, the term women who have sex with women is used to refer to all individuals who engage in sex between women.

== Sexual practices between men ==
Sexual practices between men are sexual activities involving men, regardless of their sexual orientation. These may include, for example, oral sex, mutual masturbation, anal sex, and frot. In medicine, the term men who have sex with men is used to refer to all individuals who engage in sex between men.

== See also ==
- Homosocialization
- Homoaffectivity
- Human sexual activity § Homosexuality
- Transgender sexuality § Sexual practices
- Situational sexual behavior
- Homosexual behavior in animals
  - Homosexual behavior in sheep
  - List of animals displaying homosexual behavior
    - List of mammals displaying homosexual behavior
    - List of birds displaying homosexual behavior
- Homosexual seduction
- Gay sex roles
