= List of mammals displaying homosexual behavior =

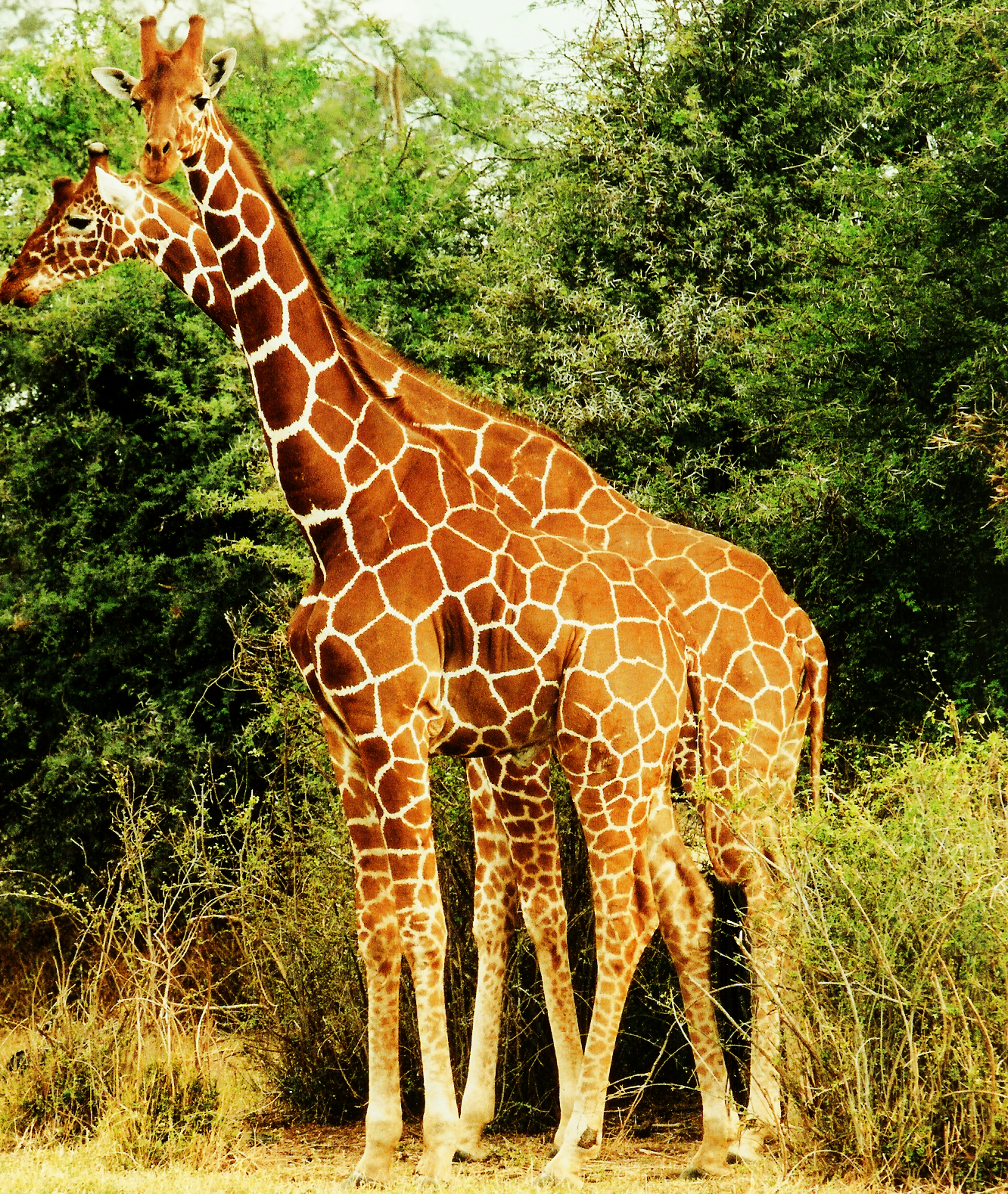
Giraffes in Kenya; giraffes have been called "especially gay" for engaging in male-male sexual behavior more often than male-female (heterosexual) sex.

This is a list of animals for which there is documented evidence of homosexual behavior. These animals have been observed practicing homosexual courtship, sexual behavior, affection, pair bonding, or parenting.

Bruce Bagemihl writes that the presence of same-sex sexual behavior was not officially observed on a large scale until the 1990s due to possible observer bias caused by social attitudes towards LGBT people, which made homosexuality in animals a taboo subject. He devotes three chapters, "Two Hundred Years at Looking at Homosexual Wildlife", "Explaining (Away) Animal Homosexuality", and "Not For Breeding Only" in his 1999 book Biological Exuberance to the "documentation of systematic prejudices" where he notes "the present ignorance of biology lies precisely in its single-minded attempt to find reproductive (or other) "explanations" for homosexuality, transgender, and non-procreative and alternative heterosexualities. Petter Bøckman, academic adviser for the Against Nature? exhibit, stated "[M]any researchers have described homosexuality as something altogether different from sex. They must realise that animals can have sex with who they will, when they will and without consideration to a researcher's ethical principles". Homosexual behavior is found amongst social birds and mammals, particularly the sea mammals and the primates.

Animal sexual behavior takes many different forms, even within the same species and the motivations for and implications of their behaviors have yet to be fully understood. Bagemihl's research shows that homosexual behavior, not necessarily sexual activity, has been documented in about 500 species as of 1999, ranging from primates to gut worms. Homosexuality in animals is controversial with some social conservatives because it asserts the naturalness of homosexuality in humans, while others counter that it has no implications and is nonsensical to equate animal behavior to morality. Animal preference and motivation is inferred from behavior, thus homosexual behavior has been given a number of terms over the years. Modern research applies the term homosexuality to all sexual behavior (copulation, genital stimulation, mating games and sexual display behavior) between animals of the same sex.

This is a list of some mammals that have been recorded engaging in homosexual behavior, which is part of a larger list of animals displaying homosexual behavior including birds, insects, fish, etc.

== Selected images ==
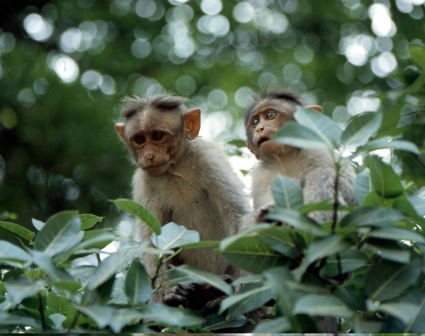
Male bonnet macaques, similar to the youthful ones pictured, "give each other hand-jobs and sometimes eat the resulting semen" although using "hand-job" can be seen as overly anthropomorphic.

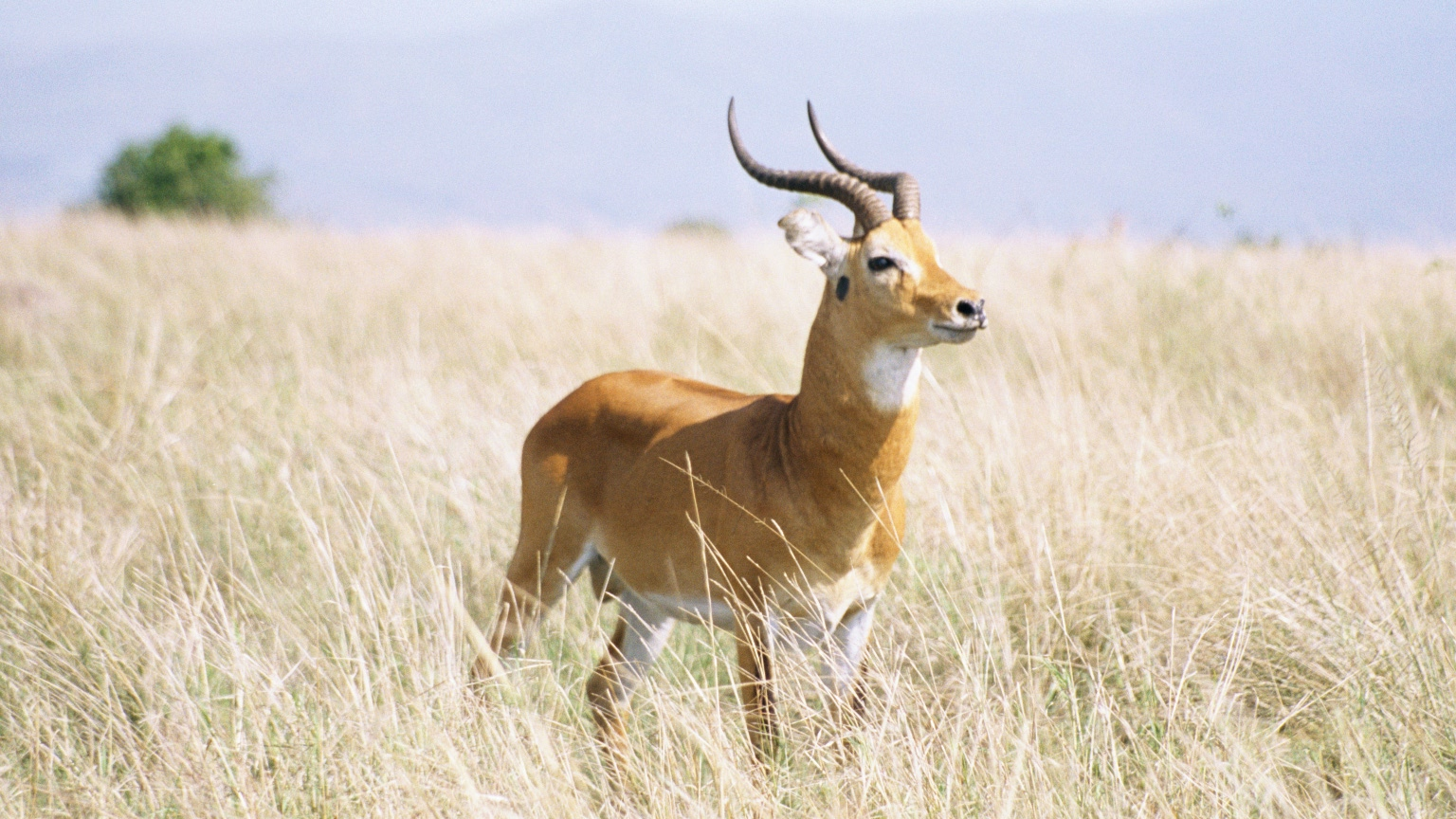
Ugandan kob - "Female kob perform oral sex on each other and even stroke each other's vulvas with their forelegs. They may exhibit urolagnia during sex, one female will urinate while the other sticks her nose in the stream."

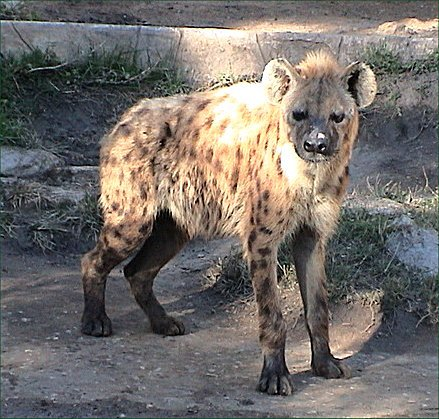
"Elevated levels of testosterone in utero" increases aggressiveness and both male and female spotted hyenas mount submissive same-sex members who likely have lower levels of testosterone from their mothers.

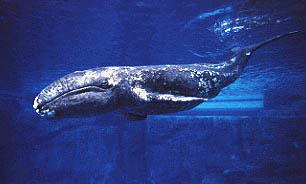
In "slip-and-slide" orgies, groups of male grey whales, roll in the ocean rubbing their bellies against each other so that their genitals are touching.

== List ==
- American bison
- Antelope
- Asian elephant
- Asiatic mouflon
- Atlantic spotted dolphin
- Australian sea lion
- Barasingha
- Barbary sheep
- Beluga
- Bharal
- Bighorn sheep
- Black bear
- Blackbuck
- Black-footed rock wallaby
- Black-tailed deer
- Bonin flying fox
- Bonnet macaque
- Bonobo
- Bottlenose dolphin
- Bowhead whale
- Brazilian guinea pig
- Bridled dolphin
- Brown bear
- Brown capuchin
- Brown long-eared bat
- Brown rat
- Buffalo
- Caribou
- Cat (domestic)
- Cattle (domestic)
- Chacma baboon
- Cheetah
- Chimpanzee
- Chital
- Collared peccary
- Commerson's dolphin
- Common brushtail possum
- Common dolphin
- Common marmoset
- Common pipistrelle
- Common tree shrew
- Common wallaroo
- Cotton-top tamarin
- Crab-eating macaque
- Crested black macaque
- Dall's sheep
- Daubenton's bat
- Dog (domestic)
- Donkey
- Doria's tree kangaroo
- Dugong
- Dwarf cavy
- Dwarf mongoose
- Eastern cottontail rabbit
- Eastern grey kangaroo
- Elk
- European bison
- European polecat
- Fallow deer
- False killer whale
- Fat-tailed dunnart
- Fin whale
- Fox
- François' langur
- Gazelle
- Gelada baboon
- Goat (domestic)
- Golden monkey
- Giraffe
- Gorilla
- Grant's gazelle
- Grey-headed flying fox
- Grey seal
- Grey squirrel
- Grey whale
- Grey wolf
- Grizzly bear
- Guinea pig (domestic)
- Hamadryas baboon
- Hamster (domestic)
- Hanuman langur
- Harbor porpoise
- Harbor seal
- Himalayan tahr
- Hoary marmot
- Horse (domestic)
- Human (see Human sexual behavior)
- Humpback whale
- Indian fruit bat
- Indian muntjac
- Indian rhinoceros
- Japanese macaque
- Javelina
- Kangaroo rat
- Killer whale
- Koala
- Kob
- Larga seal
- Least chipmunk
- Lechwe
- Lesser bushbaby
- Lion
- Lion-tailed macaque
- Lion tamarin
- Little brown bat
- Livingstone's fruit bat
- Long-eared hedgehog
- Long-footed tree shrew
- Macaque
- Markhor
- Marten
- Masked palm civet
- Moco
- Mohol galago
- Moor macaque
- Moose
- Mountain goat
- Mountain tree shrew
- Mountain zebra
- Mouse (domestic)
- Moustached tamarin
- Mule deer
- Musk-ox
- Natterer's bat
- New Zealand sea lion
- Nilgiri langur
- Noctule
- North American porcupine
- Northern elephant seal
- Northern fur seal
- Northern quoll
- Olympic marmot
- Orangutan
- Pacific striped dolphin
- Patas monkey
- Pere David's deer
- Pig (domestic)
- Pig-tailed macaque
- Plains zebra
- Polar bear
- Pretty-faced wallaby
- Proboscis monkey
- Pronghorn
- Pudú
- Puku
- Quokka
- Rabbit
- Raccoon
- Raccoon dog
- Red deer
- Red fox
- Red kangaroo
- Red-necked wallaby
- Red squirrel
- Reeves's muntjac
- Reindeer
- Rhesus macaque
- Right whale
- Rock cavy
- Rodrigues fruit bat
- Roe deer
- Rufous bettong
- Rufous-naped tamarin
- Rufous rat kangaroo
- Saddle-back tamarin
- Savanna baboon
- Sea otter
- Serotine bat
- Sheep (domestic)
- Short-beaked echidna
- Siamang
- Sika deer
- Slender tree shrew
- Snub-nosed monkey
- Sooty mangabey
- Sperm whale
- Spider monkey
- Spinifex hopping mouse
- Spinner dolphin
- Spotted hyena
- Spotted seal
- Squirrel monkey
- Striped dolphin
- Stuart's marsupial mouse
- Stumptail macaque
- Swamp deer
- Swamp wallaby
- Takhi
- Talapoin
- Tammar wallaby
- Tasmanian devil
- Tibetan macaque
- Tasmanian rat kangaroo
- Thinhorn sheep
- Thomson's gazelle
- Tiger
- Tonkean macaque
- Tucuxi
- Urial
- Ursine colobus
- Vampire bat
- Verreaux's sifaka
- Vervet
- Vicuna
- Walrus
- Wapiti
- Warthog
- Waterbuck
- Water buffalo
- Weeper capuchin
- Western grey kangaroo
- West Indian manatee
- Whiptail wallaby
- White-faced capuchin
- White-fronted capuchin
- White-handed gibbon
- White-lipped peccary
- White-tailed deer
- Wild cavy
- Wild goat
- Yellow-bellied marmot
- Yellow-footed rock wallaby
- Yellow-toothed cavy

== See also ==
- Animal sexual behavior § Mammals
- Homosexual behavior in animals § Mammals
- List of birds displaying homosexual behavior

== Bibliography ==
- "Gay Penguins Resist 'Aversion Therapy'". 365Gay.com. 11 February 2005. Archived from the original on 29 September 2007.
- Bagemihl, Bruce (1999). Biological Exuberance: Animal Homosexuality and Natural Diversity. St. Martin's Press ISBN 0-312-19239-8
- Caramagno, Thomas C (2002). Irreconcilable Differences? Intellectual Stalemate in the Gay Rights Debate Archived 2009-07-09 at the Wayback Machine; Praeger/Greenwood, ISBN 0275977218.
- Cooper, J.B. "An Exploratory Study on African Lions" in Comparative Psychology Monographs 17:1-48.
- Cziko, Gary (2000) The Things We Do: Using the Lessons of Bernard and Darwin to Understand the What, How, and Why of Our Behavior; MIT Press, ISBN 0262032775.
- de Waal, Frans B. M. (2001) The Ape and The Sushi Master: Cultural Reflections by a Primatologist; Basic Books (chapter Bonobos and Fig Leaves).
- Dunkle, S.W. (1991), "Head damage from mating attempts in dragonflies (Odonata:Anisoptera)". Entomological News 102, pp. 37–41. Retrieved on 16 June 2010.
- Eaton, R. L. (1974). "The Biology and Social Behavior of Reproduction in the Lion" in Eaton, ed. The World's Cats, vol. II; pp. 3–58; Seattle.
- Forger, Nancy G., Laurence G. Frank, S. Marc Breedlove, Stephen E. Glickman (6 December 1998). "Sexual Dimorphism of Perineal Muscles and Motoneurons in Spotted Hyenas"; The Journal of Comparative Neurology, Volume 375, Issue 2, Pages 333 - 343. Retrieved 11 September 2007.
- "Gay Animals: Alternate Lifestyles in the Wild". Live Science. 20 September 2011.
- Gómez, Jose M.; Gónzalez-Megías, A.; Verdú, M. (3 October 2023). "The evolution of same-sex sexual behaviour in mammals". Nature Communications. 14 (1): 5719. Bibcode:2023NatCo..14.5719G. doi:10.1038/s41467-023-41290-x. PMC 10547684. PMID 37788987.
- Goudarzi, Sara (16 November 2006). "Gay Animals Out of the Closet?: First-ever Museum Display Shows 51 Species Exhibiting Homosexuality". MSNBC. Retrieved on 12 September 2007.
- Harrold, Max (16 February 1999). "Creature Comforts". The Advocate. No. 779. pp. 61–62. "In his news book, Biological Exuberance: Animal Homosexuality and Natural Diversity ... author Bruce Bagemihl portrays an animal kingdom that embraces a whole spectrum of sexual orientations ... [and] paints a complex mosaic that resembles humanity ... At 751 pages and with photos and documentation of homosexual behaviour in more than 450 species of mammals, birds, repties, and insects, Biological Exuberance brings the dusty facts to light as Bagemihl deconstructs the all-heterosexual Noah's Ark we've been sold."
- Holekamp, Kay E. (2003). Research: Spotted Hyena - Introduction and Overview. Michigan State University, Department of Zoology]. Retrieved 16 June 2010.
- Hubert, Robert & Martys, Michael (1993). "Male-male Pairs in Greylag Geese (Anser anser)" Archived 2025-07-08 at the Wayback Machine. Journal of Ornithology. 134: 155–164.
- Jackson, Stephen M. (2 June 2025). Australian Mammals: Biology and Captive Management (2nd ed.). Melbourne: Csiro Publishing. ISBN 9-781486-315284.
- Kick, Russ (2001). You Are Being Lied to: The Disinformation Guide to Media Distortion, Historical Whitewashes and Cultural Myths. The Disinformation Company, ISBN 0966410076. Retrieved on 18 November 2007.
- Kishikawa, Hiroaki (27 April 2021). "Toucans kept as couple at Japanese zoo for 8 years turn out to be both female". Sapporo, Japan: Mainichi.
- "The Science of Sex". 19 September 2007. Archived from the original on 8 November 2007.
- Liggett, Dave; Columbus Zoo and Aquarium staff. "African Forest: Bonobo". Columbus Zoo and Aquarium. Archived from the original on 2 June 2002. "...frequent sex (including male-to-male and female-to-female) characterize bonobo society."
- News-medical.net (23 October 2006). "1,500 Animal Species Practice Homosexuality" Retrieved on 10 September 2007.
- Poiani, Aldo (2010). Animal Homosexuality: A Biosocial Perspective. Cambridge University Press.
- Roselli, Charles E., Kay Larkin, John A. Resko, John N. Stellflug and Fred Stormshak (2004). "The Volume of a Sexually Dimorphic Nucleus in the Ovine Medial Preoptic Area/Anterior Hypothalamus Varies with Sexual Partner Preference". Endocrinology, Department of Physiology and Pharmacology, Oregon Health & Science University (C.E.R., K.L., J.A.R.), Portland, Oregon; Department of Animal Sciences, Oregon State University (F.S.), Corvallis, Oregon; and Agricultural Research Service, United States Sheep Experiment Station (J.N.S.), Dubois, Idaho, Vol. 145, No. 2. Retrieved on 10 September 2007.
- Roughgarden, Joan (2004). Evolutions Rainbow: Diversity, Gender and Sexuality in Nature and People; University of California Press, Berkeley, pages p. 13-183.
- Schaller, G. B. (1972). The Serengeti Lion; University of Chicago Press.
- Smith, Dinitia (7 February 2004). "Love That Dare Not Squeak Its Name" New York Times. Retrieved on 10 September 2007. Reprinted as "Central Park Zoo's Gay Penguins Ignite Debate", San Francisco Chronicle.
- Sommer, Volker & Paul L. Vasey (2006). Homosexual Behaviour in Animals, An Evolutionary Perspective. Cambridge University Press, Cambridge; ISBN 0521864461.
- Srivastav, Suvira (15–31 December 2001). "Lion, Without Lioness"
- Stein, Edward (1999) The Mismeasure of Desire: The Science, Theory, and Ethics of Sexual Orientation; Oxford University Press, US; ISBN 0195142446.
- Tatarnic, Nikolai J., Gerasimos Cassis, Dieter F. Hochuli; 22 March 2006 "Traumatic insemination in the plant bug genus Coridromius Signoret (Heteroptera: Miridae)" Archived 2018-08-17 at the Wayback Machine Biology Letters Journal Volume 2, Number 1, pg 58-61: Royal Society Publishing; Retrieved 16 June 2010.
- Terry, Jennifer (2000) "'Unnatural Acts' In Nature: The Scientific Fascination with Queer Animals"; GLQ: A Journal of Lesbian and Gay Studies (6(2):151–193; OI:10.1215/10642684-6-2-151); Duke University Press.
- Utzeri, C. & C. Belfiore (1990): "Anomalous tandems in Odonata". Fragmenta Entomologica 22(2), pp. 271–288. Retrieved 11 September 2007.
- Vasey, Paul L. (1995), "Homosexual Behaviour in Primates: A Review of Evidence and Theory"; International Journal of Primatology 16: p 173-204.
- Vilet, Kent A. (2000), "Courtship behaviour of American Alligators, Alligator mississippiensis"; Crocodilian Biology and Evolution, pages 383–408
- Wilson, Anna (2003). "Sexing the Hyena: Intraspecies Readings of the Female Phallus". Signs. 28 (3). University of Chicago Press: 755–790. doi:10.1086/345320. JSTOR 10.1086/345320. S2CID 146640802.
- Zimmer, Carl (2000); Parasite Rex: Inside the Bizarre World of Nature's Most Dangerous Creatures; Simon and Schuster, ISBN 0743213718. Retrieved 18 November 2007.
