= Non-reproductive sexual behavior in animals =

Non-reproductive sexual behavior in non-human animals

Animal non-reproductive sexual behavior encompasses sexual activities that non-human animals participate in which do not lead to the reproduction of the species. Although procreation continues to be the primary explanation for sexual behavior in animals, recent observations on animal behaviors have given alternative reasons for the engagement in sexual activities by animals.

Animals have been observed to engage in sex for social interaction, bonding, exchange for significant materials, affection, mentorship pairings, sexual enjoyment, or as demonstration of social rank. Observed non-procreative sexual activities include non-copulatory mounting (without insertion, or by a female, or by a younger male who does not yet produce semen), oral sex, genital stimulation, anal stimulation, interspecies mating, same-sex sexual interaction, and acts of affection, although it is doubted that they have done this since the beginning of their existence. There have also been observations of sex with cub participants as well as sex with dead animals.

== Social interaction and bonding ==
Lions are known to engage in sex to create bonds and interact with each other. Lions live in a social group known as a pride which consists of 2–18 females and 1–7 males. The females found in these prides were born into the pride. The males enter the pride from other prides. The success of reproduction for each individual lion is dependent on the number of male lions found in their social group. Male lions create coalitions and search for other prides to take over. Successful coalitions have usually created a strong bond with each other and will take over prides. Once winning in a competition, all current males will be kicked out and left to find another pride. While in search of another pride these males will often engage in sexual behavior with each other; creating a strong bond in this new coalition created.

Sex plays a fundamental role in the social lives of bonobos. Female bonobos have been observed to engage in sexual activities to create bonds with dominant bonobos. Having created this bond with the male, they will share food with each other and not compete with each other. All members of a bonobo group are potential sex partners, regardless of age combination or sex combination. In Biological Exuberance, Bagemihl writes: "when new females (usually adolescents) join a troop, they often pair up with an older female with whom they have most of their sexual and affectionate interactions." In addition, bonobos need not limit themselves to a single partner: "These bonds need not be exclusive – either party may have sex with other females or males – but such mentorlike pairings can last for a year or more until the newcomer is fully integrated into the troop." Pairings between younger and older male bonobos are also common: "typically an adolescent male spreads his legs and presents his erect penis to an adult male, who takes the shaft in his hand and caresses it with up-and-down movements."

Social pairings between youth and adult bonobos happen across sex combinations: "Both adult males and females interact sexually with adolescents and juveniles (three-to-nine-year-olds). In fact, young females go through a five-to-six-year period sometimes referred to as adolescent sterility (although no pathology is involved) during which they actively participate in heterosexual mating (often with adults) but never get pregnant. Sexual behavior between adults and infants of both sexes is common - about a third of the time it is initiated by the infant and may involve genital rubbing and full copulatory postures (including penetration of an adult female by a male infant)."

Several species utilize sexual activity as a way to resolve disagreement. Bonobos are one species famously known for using sexual behavior as a means of resolution of social conflict.

In a study concentrated on primate conflict resolution, researchers wanted to observe primates in conflict. How primates coped and resolved conflicts was a main concern in this study. Researchers stated that after primates participated in a heated, physical fight; both primates involved in the fight would hug and have a mouth-to-mouth kiss. This action was considered as a demonstration of affection and reconciliation.

== Reward system ==
Studies of the brain have proven that pleasure and displeasure are an important component in the lives of animals. It has been established that the limbic neural mechanism that generates reactions are very similar across all mammals. Many studies have concentrated on the brain reward system and how similar it is across mammals. Through extensive research, scientists have been able to conclude that the brain reward system in animals is extremely similar to that of humans. The mechanism of core pleasure reaction is significantly important for animals including humans.

Evolutionary principles have predicted that the reward system is part of the proximate mechanism underlying the behavior. Because animals possess a brain reward system they are motivated to perform in different ways by desire and reinforced by pleasure. Animals establish security of food, shelter, social contact, and mating because proximate mechanism, if they do not seek these necessities they will not survive.

All vertebrates share similarities in body structure; they all have a skeleton, a nervous system, a circulatory system, a digestive system and excretory system. Neurophysiologists have not found any fundamental difference between the structure and function of neurons and synapse between humans and other animals.

=== Case study ===
In a case study, female Japanese macaques were studied to find evidence of possible female copulatory orgasms. The frequency of orgasms did not correlate with the age or rank of the Japanese macaques. Researchers observed that the longer and higher number of pelvic thrusts, the longer copulation lasted. There was an orgasmic response in 80 of the 240 Japanese macaques studied.

== Types of behavior ==
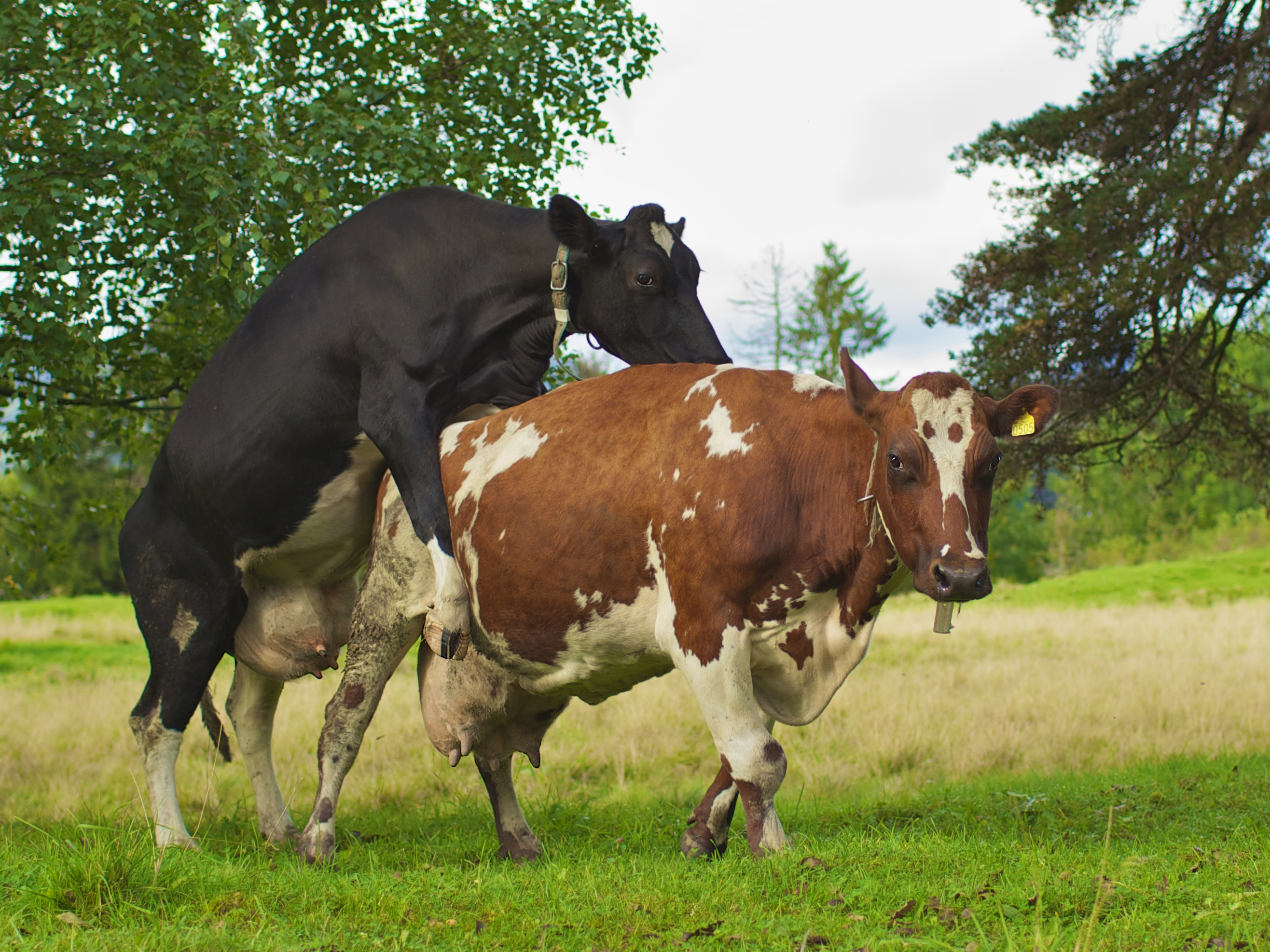
A cow "bulling" during oestrus

Engagements of sexual activities during non-breeding seasons have been observed in the animal kingdom. Dolphins and Japanese macaques are two of the many species that engage in sexual activities that do not lead to fertilization. Great varieties of non-copulatory mounting are expressed in several species. Male lions engage in mounting with other male lions, especially when in search of another pride. The varieties of mounting include mounting without erections, mounting with erection but no insertion, and mounting from the side.

Expressions of affection are displayed in the animal kingdom as well. Affectionate behaviors do not include insertion or genital rubbing, but are still seen as a manner of sexual behavior. An affectionate activity can be as simple as licking. Felids are known for head rubbing, bats engage in licking, and mountain sheep rub horns and faces with each other. Kissing, touching of noses, mouths and muzzles have been witnessed in African elephants, walruses, and mountain zebras. Non-human primates also engage in kissing that is incredibly similar to human display of kissing. Chimpanzees have full mouth-to-mouth contact, and bonobos kiss with their mouth open and mutual tongue stimulation. There are a variety of acts to show affection such as African elephants intertwining their trunks, giraffes engaging in "necking", and Hanuman langurs cuddling with each other in a front to back sitting position.

Non-penetrative genital stimulation is very common throughout the animal kingdom. Different forms of self and partner genital stimulation have been observed in the animal kingdom. Oral sex has been observed throughout the animal kingdom, from dolphins to primates. Bonobos have been observed to transition from a simple demonstration of affection to non-penetrative genital stimulation. Animals perform oral sex by licking, sucking or nuzzling the genitals of their partner. Another form of genital stimulation is masturbation. Masturbation is widespread throughout mammals for both males and females. It is less common in birds. There are several techniques, in which animals engage in masturbation from using paws, feet, flippers, tails, and sometimes using objects like sticks, pebbles, and leaves. Masturbation occurs more often in primate species with large testes relative to their body size.

=== Anal insertion ===
Anal insertion with the penis (both in heterosexual and male homosexual dyads, i.e., pairs of animals) has been observed among some primate species. Male homosexual anal insertion has been recorded in Old World primate species, including gorillas, orangutans, and some members of the Macaca genus (namely, stumptail, rhesus, and Japanese macaques). It has also been recorded in at least two New World primate species, the squirrel monkey and the spider monkey. Morris (1970) also described one heterosexual orangutan dyad for whom all penetration was performed anally. However, the practice might have been a consequence of homosexual rearing, as the male orangutan in this dyad had extensive same–sex experience. Anal insertion has also been observed among bonobo, with the observation described as 'anal intromission'.

A case of male homosexual anal insertion with the finger has also been reported among orangutans, and Bruce Bagemihl mentions it as one of the homosexual practices recorded at least once among male chimpanzees.

=== Autoeroticism or masturbation ===
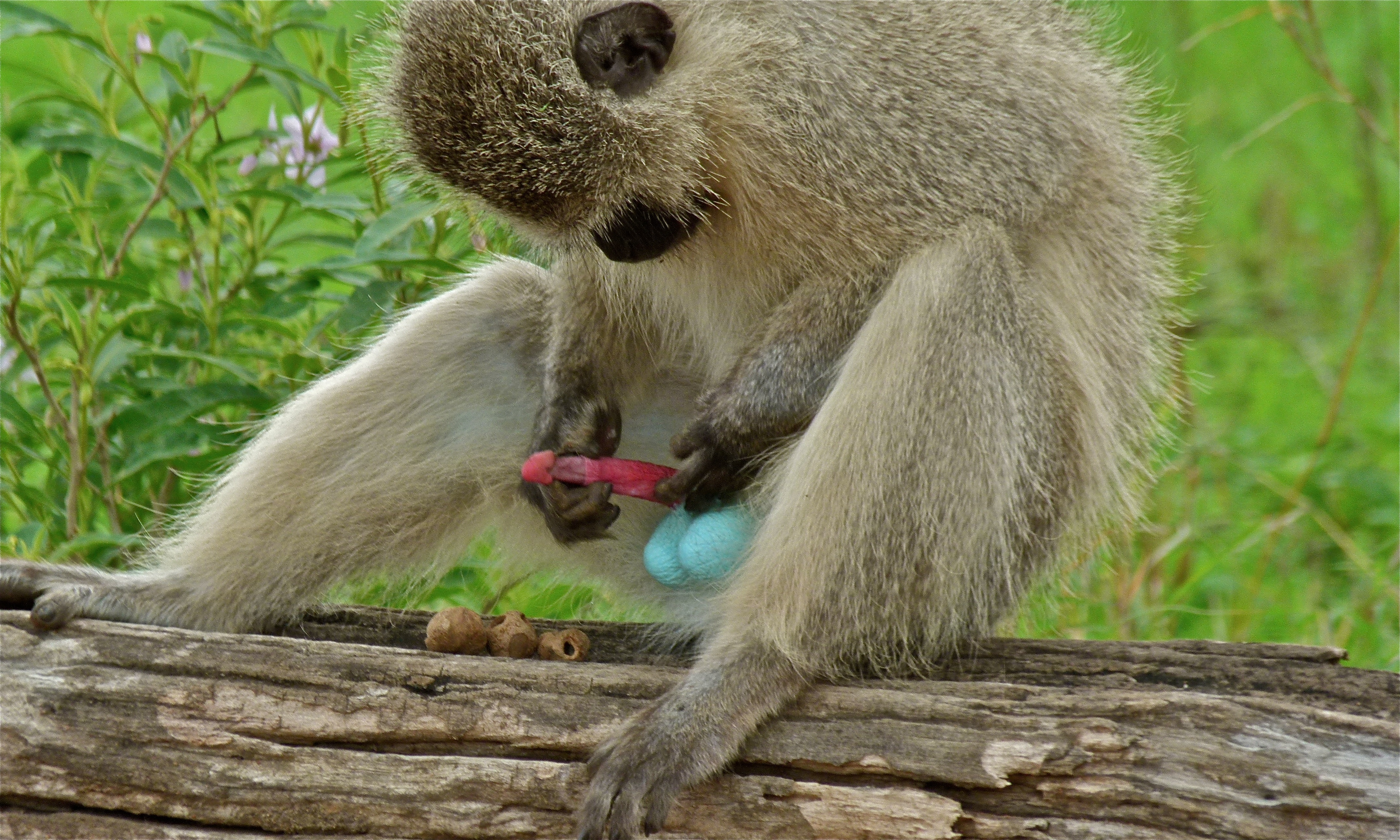
Male vervet monkey masturbating

Many animals, both male and female, masturbate, both when partners are available and otherwise. For example, it has been observed in cats, dogs, male Cape ground squirrels, male deer, rhinoceroses, boars, male monkeys, cetaceans, and otters.

A review from the University of Pennsylvania School of Veterinary Medicine says:

[The] behavior known within the horse breeding industry as masturbation ... involves normal periodic erections and penile movements. This behavior, both from the descriptive field studies cited above and in extensive study of domestic horses, is now understood as normal, frequent behavior of male equids. Attempting to inhibit or punish masturbation, for example by tying a brush to the area of the flank underside where the penis rubs into contact with the underside, which is still a common practice of horse managers regionally around the world, often leads to increased masturbation and disturbances of normal breeding behaviour.

Castration does not prevent masturbation, as it is observed in geldings. Masturbation is common in both mares and stallions, before and after puberty.

Sexologist Havelock Ellis in his 1927 Studies in the Psychology of Sex identified bulls, goats, sheep, camels and elephants as species known to practice autoeroticism, adding of some other species:

I am informed by a gentleman who is a recognized authority on goats, that they sometimes take the penis into the mouth and produce actual orgasm, thus practicing autofellatio. As regards ferrets ... "if the bitch, when in heat, cannot obtain a dog [ie, male ferret] she pines and becomes ill. If a smooth pebble is introduced into the hutch, she will masturbate upon it, thus preserving her normal health for one season. But if this artificial substitute is given to her a second season, she will not, as formerly, be content with it." ... Blumenbach observed a bear act somewhat similarly on seeing other bears coupling, and hyenas, according to Ploss and Bartels, have been seen practicing mutual masturbation by licking each other's genitals.

In his 1999 book, Biological Exuberance, Bruce Bagemihl documents that:

Autoeroticism also occurs widely among animals, both male and female. A variety of creative techniques are used, including genital stimulation using the hand or front paw (primates, Lions), foot (Vampire Bats, primates), flipper (Walruses), or tail (Savanna Baboons), sometimes accompanied by stimulation of the nipples (Rhesus Macaques, Bonobos); auto-fellating or licking, sucking and/or nuzzling by a male of his own penis (Chimpanzees, Savanna Bonobos, Vervet Monkeys, Squirrel Monkeys, Thinhorn Sheep, Bharal, Aovdad, Dwarf Cavies); stimulation of the penis by flipping or rubbing it against the belly or in its own sheath (White-tailed and Mule Deer, Zebras and Takhi); spontaneous ejaculations (Mountain Sheep, Warthogs, Spotted Hyenas); and stimulation of the genitals using inanimate objects (found in several primates and cetaceans).

Many birds masturbate by mounting and copulating with tufts of grass, leaves or mounds of earth, and some mammals such as primates and dolphins also rub their genitals against the ground or other surfaces to stimulate themselves.

Autoeroticism in female mammals, as well as heterosexual and homosexual intercourse (especially in primates), often involves direct or indirect stimulation of the clitoris ... This organ is present in the females of all mammalian species and several other animal groups.

and that:

Apes and Monkeys use a variety of objects to masturbate with and even deliberately create implements for sexual stimulation ... often in highly creative ways.

David Linden, professor of neuroscience at Johns Hopkins University, remarks that:

... perhaps the most creative form of animal masturbation is that of the male bottlenose dolphin, which has been observed to wrap a live, wriggling eel around its penis.

Among elephants, female same-sex behaviours have been documented only in captivity where they are known to masturbate one another with their trunks.

=== Oral sex ===
Animals of several species are documented as engaging in both autofellatio and oral sex. Although easily confused by laypeople, autofellatio and oral sex are separate, sexually oriented behaviors, distinct from non-sexual grooming or the investigation of scents.

Autofellatio and oral sex in animals is documented in spiders (Darwin's bark and widow), brown bears, stump-tailed macaques, Tibetan macaques, wolves, goats, primates, bats, cape ground squirrels, harvestmen(Phalangium opilio) and sheep (see section Masturbation for details).

In the greater short-nosed fruit bat, copulation by males is dorsoventral and the females lick the shaft or the base of the male's penis, but not the glans, which has already penetrated the vagina. While the females do this, the penis is not withdrawn and research has shown a positive relationship between length of the time that the penis is licked and the duration of copulation. Post copulation genital grooming has also been observed.

=== Homosexual behavior ===
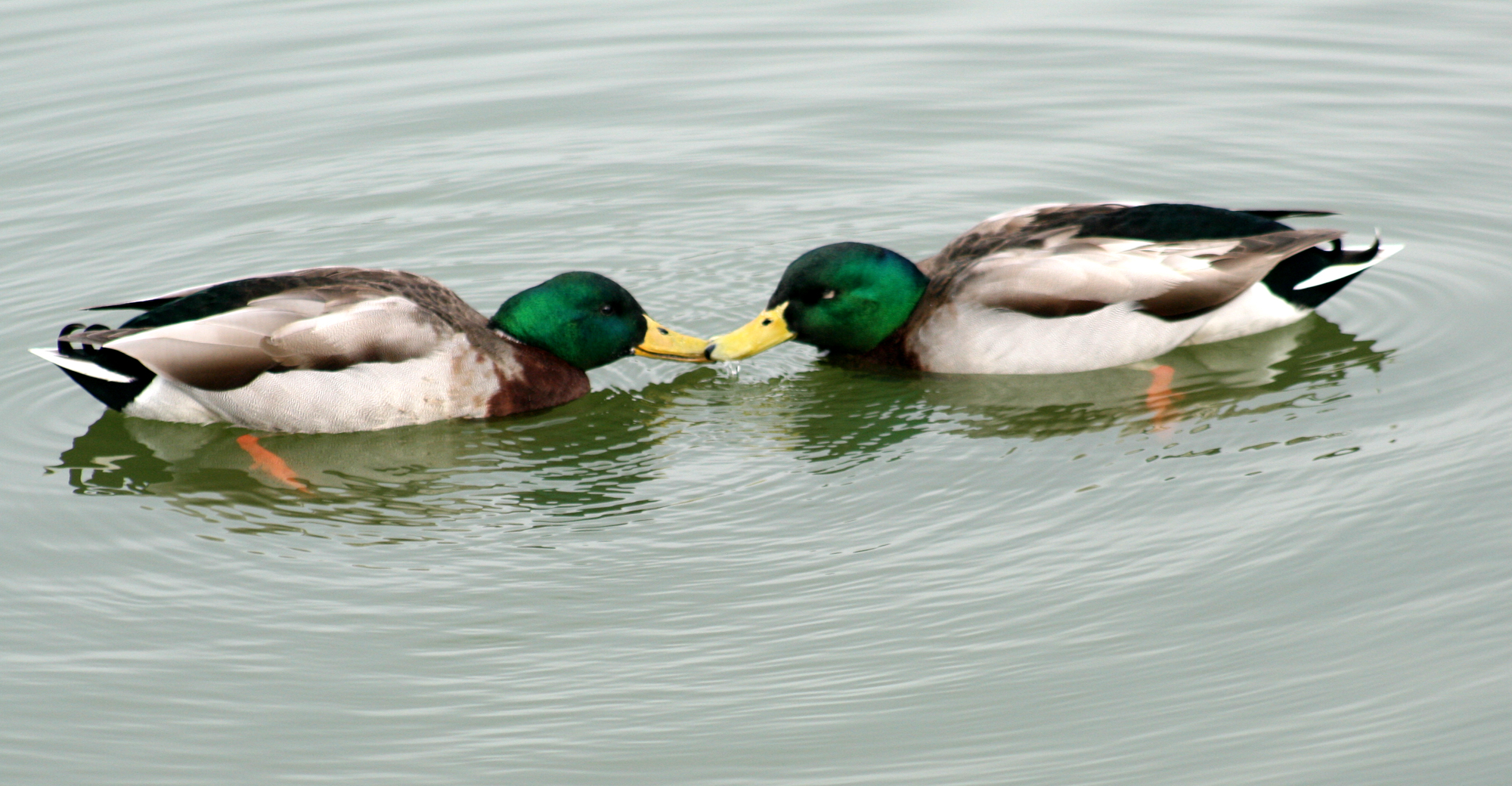
Two male mallards, Anas platyrhynchos. Mallards have rates of male–male sexual activity that are unusually high for birds, in some cases, as high as 19% of all pairs in a population.

The presence of same-sex sexual behaviour was not scientifically reported on a large scale until recent times. Homosexual behaviour does occur in the animal kingdom outside humans, especially in social species, particularly in marine birds and mammals, monkeys, and the great apes. As of 1999, the scientific literature contained reports of homosexual behavior in at least 471 wild species.

Homosexual behavior exists on a spectrum, and may or may not involve insertion. Apart from sexual activity, it can refer to homosexual pair-bonding, homosexual parenting and homosexual acts of affection. Engaging in homosexual behavior may allow species to obtain benefits such as gaining practice, relieving tension, and experiencing pleasure. Georgetown University professor Janet Mann has specifically theorised that homosexual behaviour, at least in dolphins, is an evolutionary advantage that minimizes intraspecies aggression, especially among males.

After studying bonobos for his book Bonobo: The Forgotten Ape, primatologist Frans de Waal, a professor of psychology at Emory University in Atlanta, says that such expressions of intimacy are consistent with the homosexual behaviour of what he terms "the erotic champions of the world". "Same-sex, opposite-sex — bonobos just love sex play," de Waal said in an interview. "They have so much sex, it gets boring."

Homosexual behaviour is found in 6–10% of rams (sheep) and associated with variations in cerebral mass distribution and chemical activity.

Approximately eight percent of [male] rams exhibit sexual preferences [that is, even when given a choice] for male partners (male-oriented rams) in contrast to most rams, which prefer female partners (female-oriented rams). We identified a cell group within the medial preoptic area/anterior hypothalamus of age-matched adult sheep that was significantly larger in adult rams than in ewes ...

Male bighorn sheep are divisible into two kinds: the typical males among whom homosexual behaviour, including intercourse, is common and "effeminate sheep", or "behavioural transvestites", which are not known to engage in homosexual behaviour.

Male–male copulation has been observed in captive penguins and homosexual behaviour has been observed among bats, in particular, the fruit bat.

==== Genital–genital rubbing ====
Genital–genital rubbing, or GG rubbing, among non-human animals is sexual activity in which one animal rubs his or her genitals against the genitals of another animal. The term GG rubbing is frequently used by primatologists to describe this type of sexual intimacy among female bonobos, and is stated to be the "bonobo's most typical sexual pattern, undocumented in any other primate". The term is sometimes used in reference to GG rubbing among male bonobos, under the term "penis fencing", which is the non-human form of frot that human males engage in. Such rubbing between males is thought, according to varying evolutionary theorists, to have existed before the development of hominids into humans and bonobos, and may or may not have occurred in the homosexual activity of both of these genetically related species.

Genital rubbing has been observed once among male orangutans and several times in a small group of lar gibbons, where two males thrust their genitals together, sometimes resulting in ejaculation in one of the partners. It has been observed among bull manatees, in conjunction with "kissing", and is also common among homosexually active mammals.

=== Inter-species sex ===
Some animals opportunistically mate with individuals of another species. This is more commonly observed in domesticated species and animals in captivity, possibly because captivity is associated with a decrease in aggression and an increase in sexual receptivity. Nevertheless, animals in the wild have been observed to attempt sexual activity with other species. It is mostly documented among species that belong to the same genus, but sometimes occurs between species of distant taxa. Alfred Kinsey cites reports of sexual activity involving a female eland with an ostrich, a male dog with a chicken, a male monkey with a snake, and a female chimpanzee with a cat.

A 2008 review of the literature found 44 species pairs that had been observed attempting interspecies mating, and 46 species pairs that had completed interspecies matings, not counting cases that had resulted in hybridization. Most were known from laboratory experiments, but field observations had also been made. It may result in fitness loss because of the waste of time, energy, and nutrients.

Inter-species sex has been documented among a variety of pinnipeds. Elephant seals have been documented forcibly copulating with a variety of inappropriate partners, including seals of other species. Interspecies sexual behavior has also been observed in sea lions. Other seals have been observed forcibly copulating with penguins. Male sea otters have been observed copulating with seals.

Male grasshoppers of the species Tetrix ceperoi often mount other species of either sex and even flies, but are normally repelled by the larger females. Males of the spider mite species Panonychus citri copulate with female Panonychus mori mites almost as often as with their own species, even though it does not result in reproduction.

The orangutan is the only non-human species known to have forcefully copulated with a human, with one such incident involving an acquaintance of Biruté Galdikas. The Japanese macaque has been observed attempting to mate with the sika deer.

=== Sex involving juveniles ===
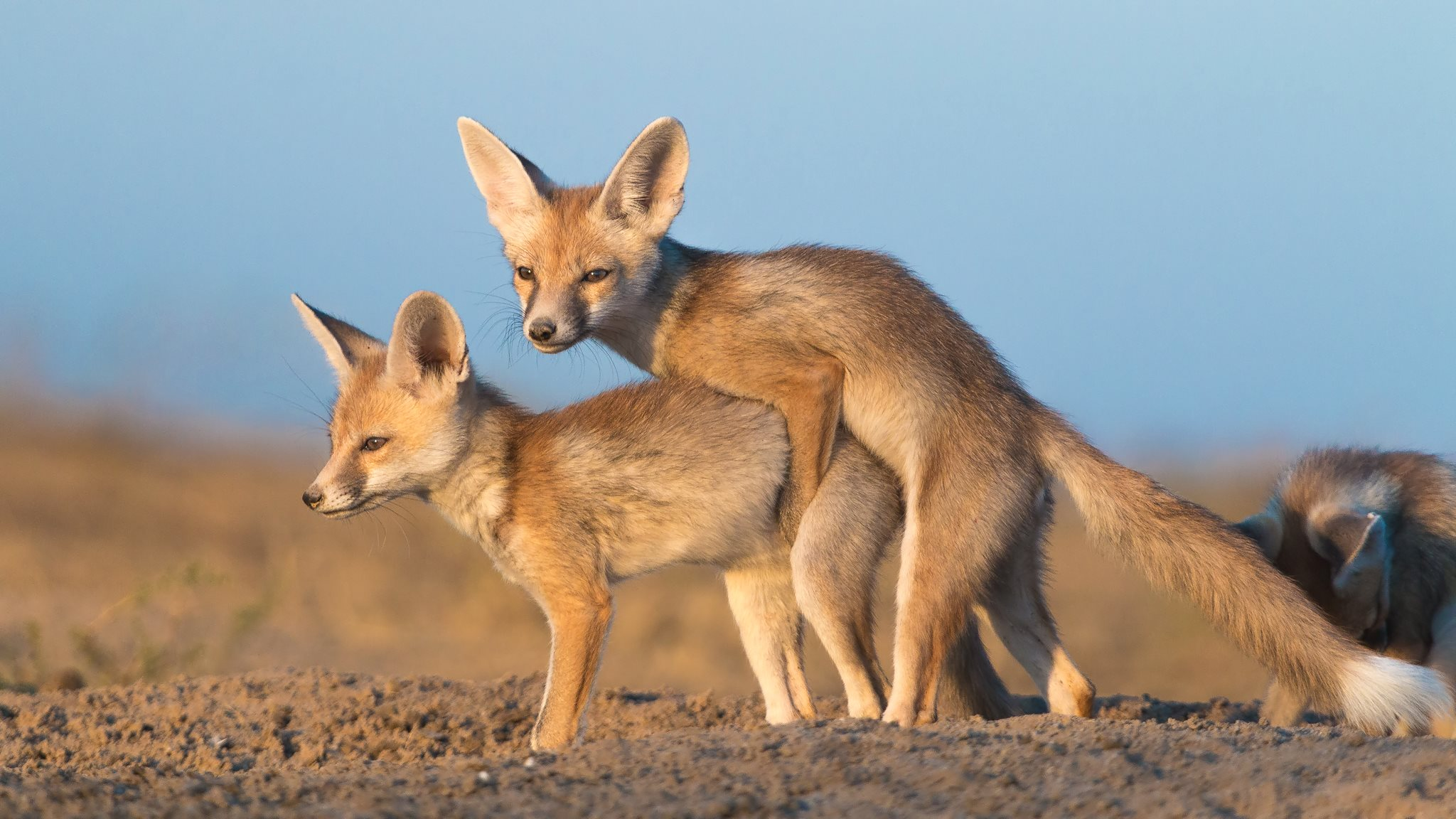
"Mock mating" of desert fox pups

In one reported observation, a male spotted hyena attempted to mate with a female hyena, but she succeeded in driving him off. He eventually turned to her 10-month-old cub, repeatedly mounting and ejaculating on it. The cub sometimes ignored this and sometimes struggled "slightly as if in play". The mother did not intervene.

It appears to be common in the Adélie penguin.

Among insects, there have been reports of immature females being forcibly copulated with.

Juvenile male chimpanzees have been recorded mounting and copulating with immature chimps. Infants in bonobo societies are often involved in sexual behaviour. Immature male bonobos have been recorded initiating genital play with both adolescent and mature female bonobos. Copulation-like contact between immature bonobo males and mature female bonobos increases with age and continues until the male bonobo has reached juvenile age. In contrast, adult gorillas do not show any sexual interest in juvenile or infant members of their species. Primates regularly have sex in full view of infants, juveniles and younger members of their species.

=== Necrophilia ===
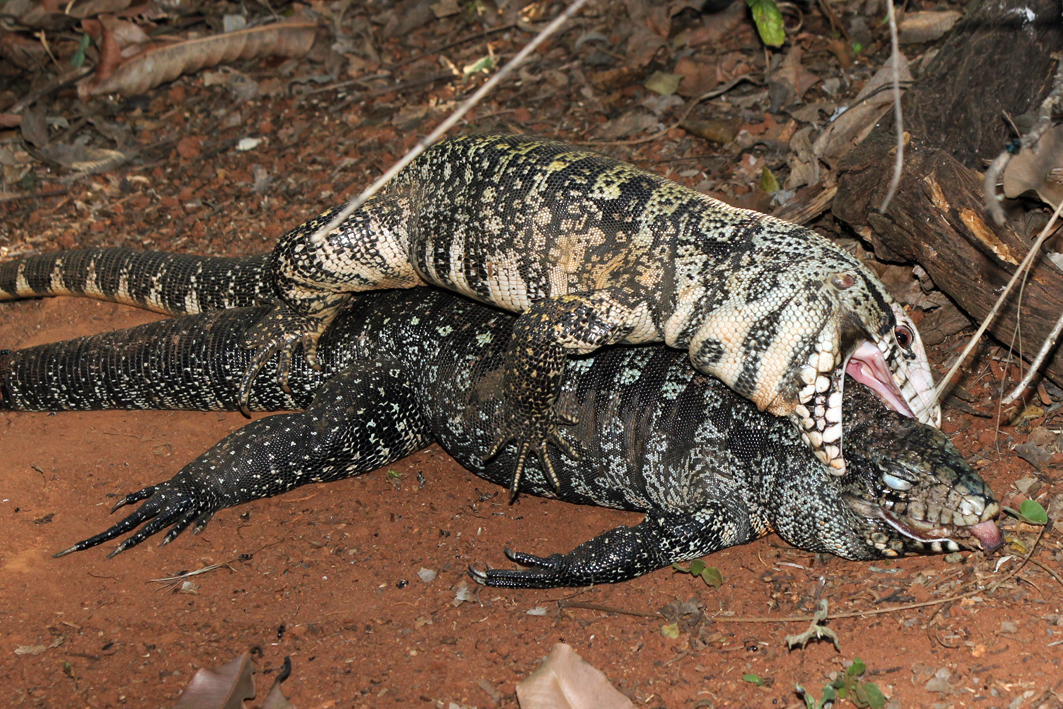
A male black and white tegu mounts a female that has been dead for two days and attempts to mate

Necrophilia describes when an animal engages in a sexual act with a dead animal. It has been observed in mammals, birds, reptiles and frogs. It sometimes occurs in the Adélie penguin. Homosexual necrophilia has been reported between two male mallard ducks. One duck was believed to be pursuing another duck with the goal of rape (a common aspect of duck sexual behaviour) when the second duck collided with a window and died immediately. The observer, Kees Moeliker, suggested that "when one died, the other one just went for it and didn't get any negative feedback—well, didn't get any feedback." The case study earned Moeliker an Ig Nobel Prize in biology.
