= List of birds displaying homosexual behavior =

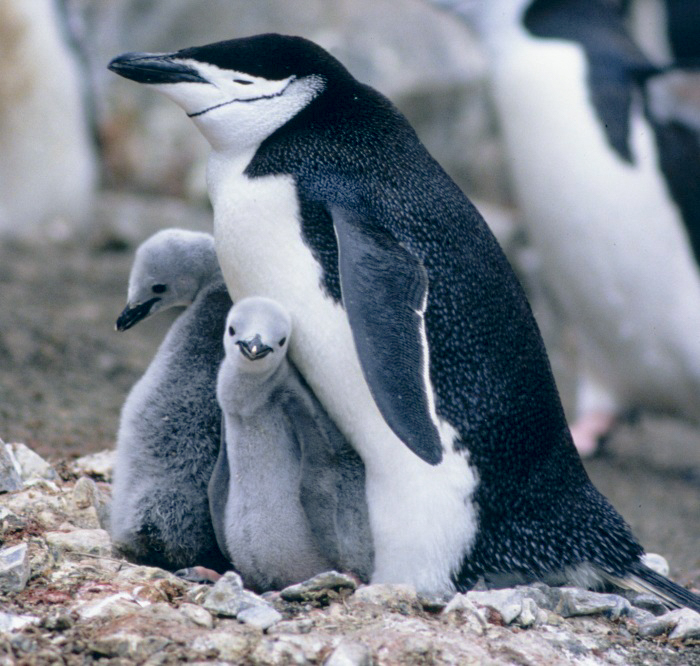
Two New York Central Park Zoo's male chinstrap penguins, similar to those pictured, became internationally known when they coupled and later were given an egg that needed hatching and care, which they successfully did.

For these birds, there is documented evidence of homosexual behavior in one or more of the following kinds: sex, courtship, affection, pair bonding, or parenting, as noted in researcher and author Bruce Bagemihl's 1999 book Biological Exuberance: Animal Homosexuality and Natural Diversity.

According to Bagemihl, animal sexual behavior takes many different forms, even within the same species and the motivations for and implications of their behaviors have yet to be fully understood. Bagemihl's research shows that homosexual behavior, not necessarily sex, has been documented in about 500 species as of 1999, ranging from primates to gut worms. Homosexuality in animals is seen as controversial by social conservatives because it asserts the naturalness of homosexuality in humans, while others counter that it has no implications and is nonsensical to equate animal behavior to morality. Animal preference and motivation is always inferred from behavior. Thus homosexual behavior has been given a number of terms over the years. The correct usage of the term homosexual is that an animal exhibits homosexual behavior, however this article conforms to the usage by modern research applying the term homosexuality to all sexual behavior (copulation, genital stimulation, mating games and sexual display behavior) between animals of the same sex.

This list is part of a larger list of animals displaying homosexual behavior including mammals, insects, fish etc.

== Selected images ==
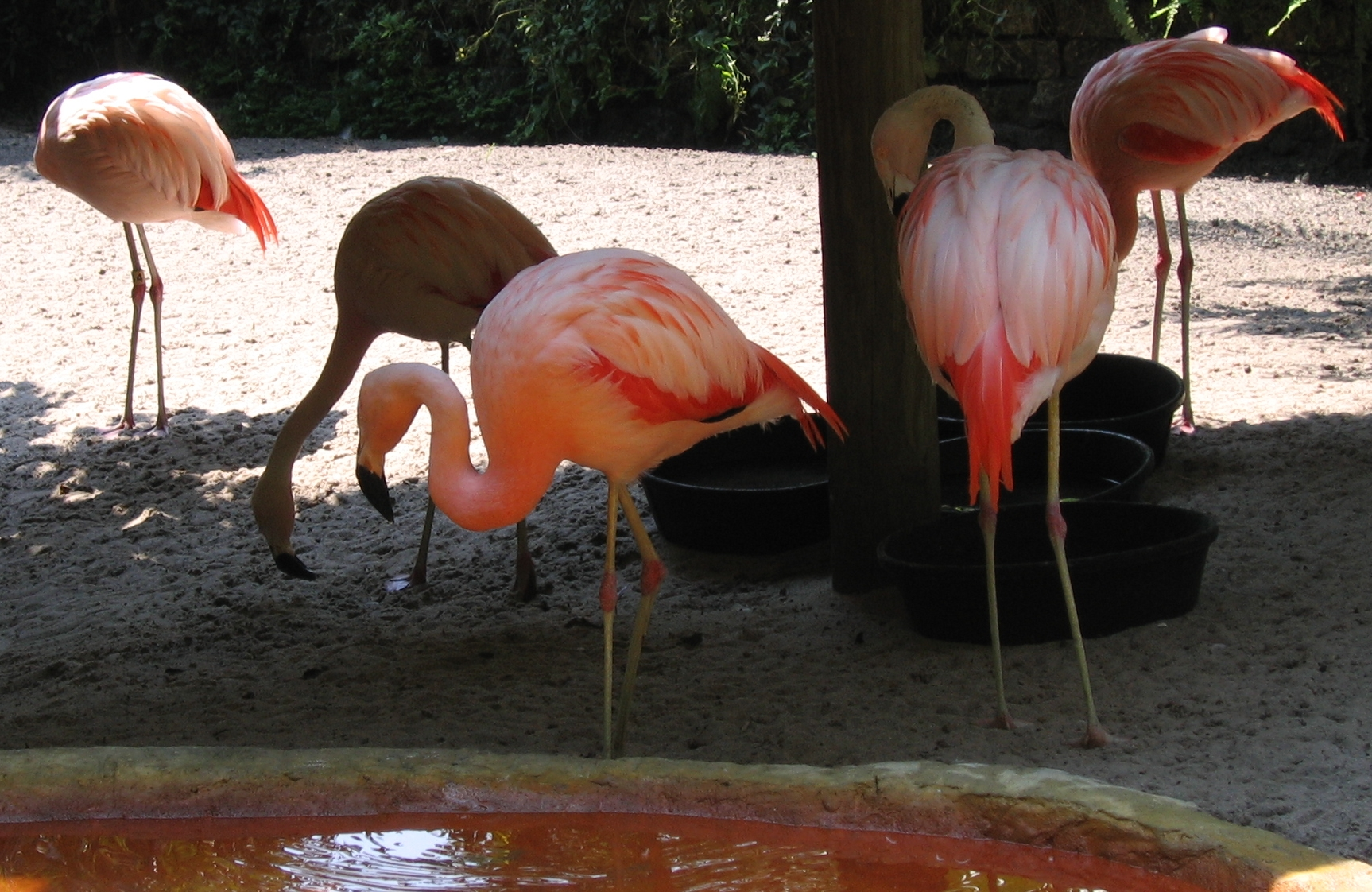
Chilean flamingoes eating, drinking, and preening in St. Petersburg, Florida; flamingos (as well as penguins and other species) sometimes form committed same-sex relationships that can involve sex, traveling and living together, and raising young together.

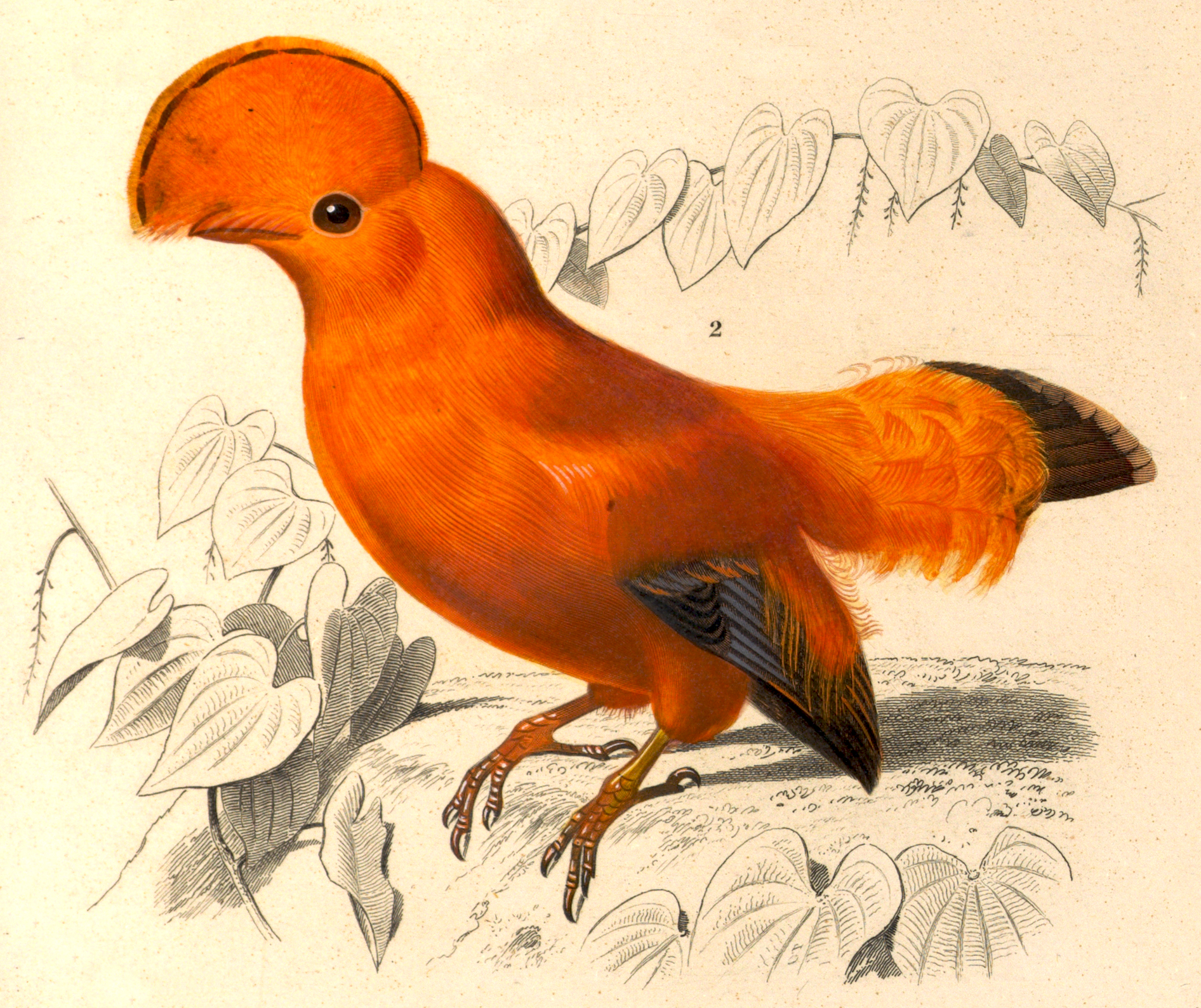
Male Guianan cock-of-the-rock, distributed in the mountainous regions of Guyana, eastern Colombia, southern Venezuela, Suriname, French Guiana and northern Amazonian Brazil, "delight in homosexuality" with almost 40 percent engaging in a form of homosexual activity and a small percentage never copulating with females.

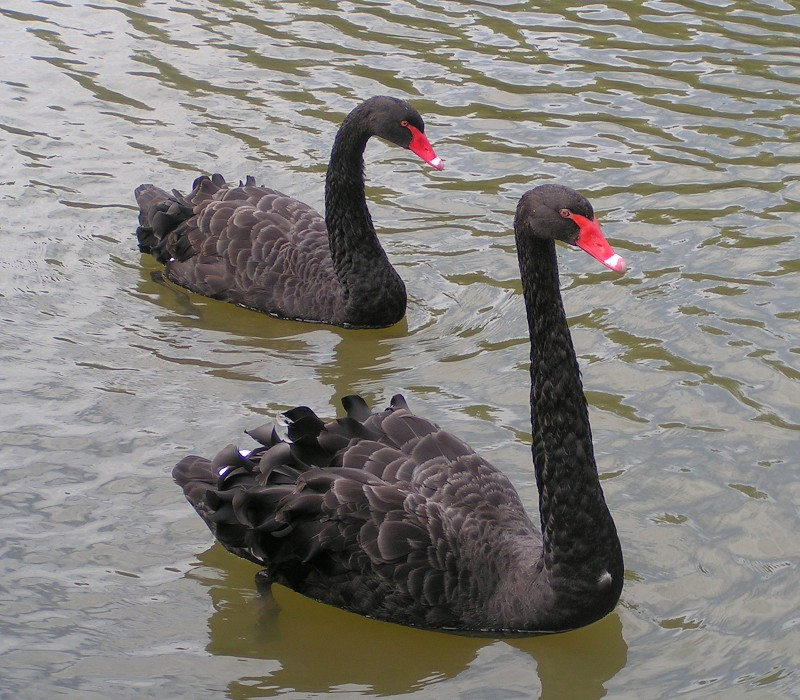
The black swan, Cygnus atratus is a large waterbird which breeds mainly in the southeast and southwest regions of Australia. An estimated one-quarter of all black swans pairings are homosexual and they steal nests, or form temporary threesomes with females to obtain eggs, driving away the female after she lays the eggs.

== Birds ==
- Acorn woodpecker
- Adelie penguin
- American flamingo
- American herring gull
- Anna's hummingbird
- Australian shelduck
- Aztec parakeet
- Bengalese finch (domestic)
- Bank swallow
- Barn owls
- Bearded vulture
- Bicolored antbird
- Black-billed magpie
- Black-capped chickadee
- Black-crowned night heron
- Black-headed gull
- Black-rumped flameback
- Black stilt
- Black swan
- Black-winged stilt
- Blue-backed manakin
- Blue-bellied roller
- Blue crowned conure
- Blue tit
- Blue-winged teal
- Brown-headed cowbird
- Budgerigar (domestic)
- Buff-breasted sandpiper
- Calfbird
- California gull
- Canada goose
- Canary-winged parakeet
- Caspian tern
- Cattle egrets
- Cockatiel
- Common chaffinch
- Chicken
- Chilean flamingo
- Chiloe wigeon
- Chinstrap penguin
- Cliff swallow
- Common gull
- Common murre
- Common redshank
- Common shelduck
- Crane spp.
- Dusky moorhen
- Domesticated turkey
- Eastern bluebird
- Egyptian goose
- Elegant parrot
- Emu
- Eurasian oystercatcher
- Eurasian jay
- European shag
- Galah
- Gentoo penguin
- Golden bishop bird
- Golden plover
- Gray-capped social weaver
- Grey heron
- Great cormorant
- Greater bird of paradise
- Greater flamingo
- Greater rhea
- Green cheek conure
- Green sandpiper
- Greenshank
- Greylag goose
- Griffon vulture
- Guianan cock-of-the-rock
- Guillemot
- Hammerkop
- Herring gull
- Hoary-headed grebe
- Hooded warbler
- House sparrow
- Humboldt penguin
- Ivory gull
- Jackdaw
- Kestrel
- King penguin
- Kittiwake
- Laughing gull
- Laysan albatross
- Lesser flamingo
- Lesser scaup duck
- Little blue heron
- Little egret
- Long-tailed hermit hummingbird
- Lory spp.
- Mallard
- Masked lovebird
- Mealy amazon parrot
- Mew gull
- Mexican jay
- Musk duck
- Mute swan
- Ocellated antbird
- Ocher-bellied flycatcher
- Orange bishop bird
- Orange-fronted parakeet
- Ornate lorikeet
- Ostrich
- Peach-faced lovebird
- Pied flycatcher
- Pied kingfisher
- Pigeon (domestic)
- Powerful owl
- Purple swamphen
- Raggiana's bird of paradise
- Ravens
- Razorbill
- Red-backed shrike
- Red bishop bird
- Red-faced lovebird
- Red-shouldered widowbird
- Regent bowerbird
- Ring-billed gull
- Ring dove
- Rock dove
- Roseate tern
- Rose-ringed parakeet
- Ruff
- Ruffed grouse
- Sage grouse
- San Blas jay
- Sand martin
- Satin bowerbird
- Scarlet ibis
- Scottish crossbill
- Senegal parrot
- Sharp-tailed sparrow
- Silver gull
- Silvery grebe
- Snow goose
- Stitchbird
- Superb lyrebird
- Swallow-tailed manakin
- Tasmanian native hen
- Toco toucan
- Tree swallow
- Trumpeter swan
- Victoria's riflebird
- Wattled starling
- Western gull
- White-fronted amazon parrot
- White stork
- Wood duck
- Yellow-backed lorikeet
- Yellow-rumped cacique
- Zebra finch (domestic)

== See also ==
- Against Nature?, an exhibit at the University of Oslo's Natural History Museum that took place until 19 August 2007.
- Anthropomorphism
- Behavioral ecology is the study of the ecological and evolutionary basis for animal behavior
- Biodiversity
- Bioethics
- Biology and sexual orientation
- Ethology is the scientific study of animal behavior, and a branch of zoology; cognitive ethology fuses cognitive science and classical ethology to observe animals under more-or-less natural conditions
- Evolutionary biology
- Homosexual behavior in animals § Birds
- Innate bisexuality
- Sexual selection

== Bibliography ==
- "Gay Penguins Resist 'Aversion Therapy'". 365Gay.com. 11 February 2005. Archived from the original on 29 September 2007.
- Bagemihl, Bruce (1999). Biological Exuberance: Animal Homosexuality and Natural Diversity. St. Martin's Press ISBN 0-312-19239-8
- Caramagno, Thomas C (2002). Irreconcilable Differences? Intellectual Stalemate in the Gay Rights Debate Archived 2009-07-09 at the Wayback Machine; Praeger/Greenwood, ISBN 0275977218.
- Cooper, J.B. "An Exploratory Study on African Lions" in Comparative Psychology Monographs 17:1-48.
- Cziko, Gary (2000) The Things We Do: Using the Lessons of Bernard and Darwin to Understand the What, How, and Why of Our Behavior; MIT Press, ISBN 0262032775.
- de Waal, Frans B. M. (2001) The Ape and The Sushi Master: Cultural Reflections by a Primatologist; Basic Books (chapter Bonobos and Fig Leaves).
- Dunkle, S.W. (1991), "Head damage from mating attempts in dragonflies (Odonata:Anisoptera)". Entomological News 102, pp. 37–41. Retrieved on 16 June 2010.
- Eaton, R. L. (1974). "The Biology and Social Behavior of Reproduction in the Lion" in Eaton, ed. The World's Cats, vol. II; pp. 3–58; Seattle.
- Forger, Nancy G., Laurence G. Frank, S. Marc Breedlove, Stephen E. Glickman (6 December 1998). "Sexual Dimorphism of Perineal Muscles and Motoneurons in Spotted Hyenas"; The Journal of Comparative Neurology, Volume 375, Issue 2, Pages 333 - 343. Retrieved 11 September 2007.
- "Gay Animals: Alternate Lifestyles in the Wild". Live Science. 20 September 2011.
- Gómez, Jose M.; Gónzalez-Megías, A.; Verdú, M. (3 October 2023). "The evolution of same-sex sexual behaviour in mammals". Nature Communications. 14 (1): 5719. Bibcode:2023NatCo..14.5719G. doi:10.1038/s41467-023-41290-x. PMC 10547684. PMID 37788987.
- Goudarzi, Sara (16 November 2006). "Gay Animals Out of the Closet?: First-ever Museum Display Shows 51 Species Exhibiting Homosexuality". MSNBC. Retrieved on 12 September 2007.
- Harrold, Max (February 16, 1999). "Creature Comforts". The Advocate. No. 779. pp. 61–62. "In his news book, Biological Exuberance: Animal Homosexuality and Natural Diversity ... author Bruce Bagemihl portrays an animal kingdom that embraces a whole spectrum of sexual orientations ... [and] paints a complex mosaic that resembles humanity ... At 751 pages and with photos and documentation of homosexual behaviour in more than 450 species of mammals, birds, repties, and insects, Biological Exuberance brings the dusty facts to light as Bagemihl deconstructs the all-heterosexual Noah's Ark we've been sold."
- Holekamp, Kay E. (2003). Research: Spotted Hyena - Introduction and Overview. Michigan State University, Department of Zoology]. Retrieved 16 June 2010.
- Hubert, Robert & Martys, Michael (1993). "Male-male Pairs in Greylag Geese (Anser anser)" Archived 2025-07-08 at the Wayback Machine. Journal of Ornithology. 134: 155–164.
- Jackson, Stephen M. (2 June 2025). Australian Mammals: Biology and Captive Management (2nd ed.). Melbourne: Csiro Publishing. ISBN 9-781486-315284.
- Kick, Russ (2001). You Are Being Lied to: The Disinformation Guide to Media Distortion, Historical Whitewashes and Cultural Myths. The Disinformation Company, ISBN 0966410076. Retrieved on 18 November 2007.
- Kishikawa, Hiroaki (April 27, 2021). "Toucans kept as couple at Japanese zoo for 8 years turn out to be both female". Sapporo, Japan: Mainichi.
- "The Science of Sex". 19 September 2007. Archived from the original on 2007-11-08.
- Liggett, Dave; Columbus Zoo and Aquarium staff. "African Forest: Bonobo". Columbus Zoo and Aquarium. Archived from the original on June 2, 2002. "...frequent sex (including male-to-male and female-to-female) characterize bonobo society."
- News-medical.net (23 October 2006). "1,500 Animal Species Practice Homosexuality" Retrieved on 10 September 2007.
- Poiani, Aldo (2010). Animal Homosexuality: A Biosocial Perspective. Cambridge University Press.
- Roselli, Charles E., Kay Larkin, John A. Resko, John N. Stellflug and Fred Stormshak (2004). "The Volume of a Sexually Dimorphic Nucleus in the Ovine Medial Preoptic Area/Anterior Hypothalamus Varies with Sexual Partner Preference". Endocrinology, Department of Physiology and Pharmacology, Oregon Health & Science University (C.E.R., K.L., J.A.R.), Portland, Oregon; Department of Animal Sciences, Oregon State University (F.S.), Corvallis, Oregon; and Agricultural Research Service, United States Sheep Experiment Station (J.N.S.), Dubois, Idaho, Vol. 145, No. 2. Retrieved on 10 September 2007.
- Roughgarden, Joan (2004). Evolutions Rainbow: Diversity, Gender and Sexuality in Nature and People; University of California Press, Berkeley, pages p. 13-183.
- Schaller, G. B. (1972). The Serengeti Lion; University of Chicago Press.
- Smith, Dinitia (7 February 2004). "Love That Dare Not Squeak Its Name" New York Times. Retrieved on 10 September 2007. Reprinted as "Central Park Zoo's Gay Penguins Ignite Debate", San Francisco Chronicle.
- Sommer, Volker & Paul L. Vasey (2006). Homosexual Behaviour in Animals, An Evolutionary Perspective. Cambridge University Press, Cambridge; ISBN 0521864461.
- Srivastav, Suvira (15–31 December 2001). "Lion, Without Lioness"
- Stein, Edward (1999) The Mismeasure of Desire: The Science, Theory, and Ethics of Sexual Orientation; Oxford University Press, US; ISBN 0195142446.
- Tatarnic, Nikolai J., Gerasimos Cassis, Dieter F. Hochuli; 22 March 2006 "Traumatic insemination in the plant bug genus Coridromius Signoret (Heteroptera: Miridae)" Archived 2018-08-17 at the Wayback Machine Biology Letters Journal Volume 2, Number 1, pg 58-61: Royal Society Publishing; Retrieved 16 June 2010.
- Terry, Jennifer (2000) "'Unnatural Acts' In Nature: The Scientific Fascination with Queer Animals"; GLQ: A Journal of Lesbian and Gay Studies (6(2):151–193; OI:10.1215/10642684-6-2-151); Duke University Press.
- Utzeri, C. & C. Belfiore (1990): "Anomalous tandems in Odonata". Fragmenta Entomologica 22(2), pp. 271–288. Retrieved 11 September 2007.
- Vasey, Paul L. (1995), "Homosexual Behaviour in Primates: A Review of Evidence and Theory"; International Journal of Primatology 16: p 173-204.
- Vilet, Kent A. (2000), "Courtship behaviour of American Alligators, Alligator mississippiensis"; Crocodilian Biology and Evolution, pages 383–408
- Wilson, Anna (2003). "Sexing the Hyena: Intraspecies Readings of the Female Phallus". Signs. 28 (3). University of Chicago Press: 755–790. doi:10.1086/345320. JSTOR 10.1086/345320. S2CID 146640802.
- Zimmer, Carl (2000); Parasite Rex: Inside the Bizarre World of Nature's Most Dangerous Creatures; Simon and Schuster, ISBN 0743213718. Retrieved 18 November 2007.
