= Michael Schmidt (designer) =

American costume designer

Michael Schmidt is a wardrobing, jewelry and interior designer working primarily in the entertainment industry. He is known for working with a variety of innovative materials and techniques, such as a 3-D printed dress he created for Dita Von Teese. His clothing has been worn by celebrities such as Madonna, Cher, and the Black Eyed Peas.

In 1991 Schmidt received an Emmy nomination for his costume design in Cher... At the Mirage. His work has been exhibited at several museums such as the Pasadena Museum of California Art and the Los Angeles County Museum of Art.

== Career ==
Schmidt had an early interest in wardrobe design and one of his early designs, a handmade chainmail dress, appeared on the cover of a New York magazine, Details Magazine. He has worked on various projects such as a knotted rope curtain construction for the lobby of the Ace Hotel in Palm Springs, California. Since 2001 he has collaborated with the international luxury goods firm Chrome Hearts and has also had an ongoing on-going collaborative relationship with designer Jeremy Scott. In 2012 he launched a jewelry collection through his studio Michael Schmidt Studios. In 2025, Schmidt created a Grindr x Rainbow Wool collection of knitwear using wool from a German farm specialising in rescuing gay rams from slaughter.

== Exhibitions ==
Schmidt's work has been part of several exhibits at places such as the following:

- Rock Style at the Metropolitan Museum of Art, 2010
- Action/Reaction at the Pasadena Museum of California Art, 2010
- Career retrospective at the Los Angeles County Museum of Art, 2013

== Awards ==
- Outstanding Costumes for a Variety Program or Special for Cher... At The Mirage (1991, nomination)
