= List of animals displaying homosexual behavior =

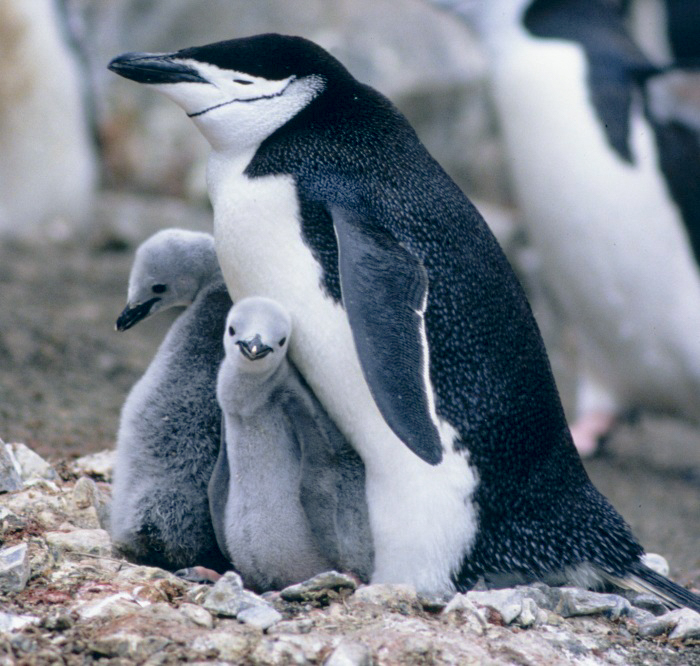
Roy and Silo, two Central Park Zoo male chinstrap penguins similar to those pictured, became internationally known when they successfully hatched and cared for an egg they were given.

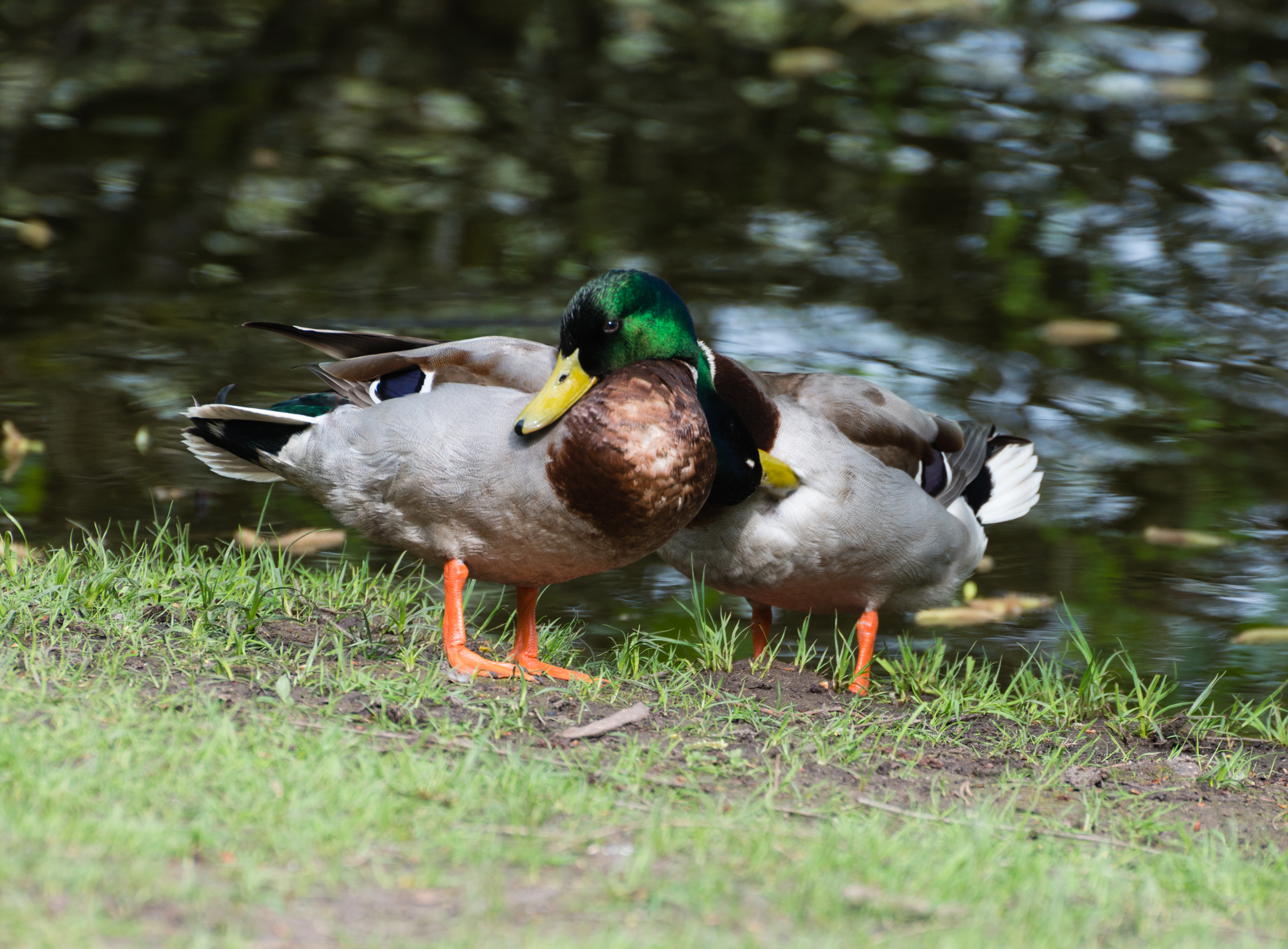
Couple of male mallard ducks in a nature reserve in Germany

For these animals, there is documented evidence of homosexual behavior of one or more of the following kinds: sex, courtship, affection, pair bonding, or parenting, as noted in researcher and author Bruce Bagemihl's 1999 book Biological Exuberance: Animal Homosexuality and Natural Diversity.

Bagemihl writes that the presence of same-sex sexual behavior was not "officially" observed on a large scale until the 1990s due to observer bias caused by social attitudes towards nonheterosexual people, making the homosexual theme taboo. Bagemihl devotes three chapters, "Two Hundred Years at Looking at Homosexual Wildlife", "Explaining (Away) Animal Homosexuality" and "Not For Breeding Only" in his 1999 book Biological Exuberance to the "documentation of systematic prejudices" where he notes "the present ignorance of biology lies precisely in its single-minded attempt to find reproductive (or other) 'explanations' for homosexuality, transgender, and non-procreative and alternative heterosexualities."

Petter Bøckman, academic adviser for the Against Nature? exhibit, stated "[M]any researchers have described homosexuality as something altogether different from sex. They must realize that animals can have sex with who they will, when they will and without consideration to a researcher's ethical principles." Homosexual behavior is found amongst social birds and mammals, particularly the sea mammals and the primates. In 1986, it was even discovered amongst insects when butterfly scientist W.J. Tennent observed four male Mazarine blues competing for the attention of another male in Morocco.

Sexual behavior takes many different forms, even within the same species and the motivations for and implications of their behaviors have yet to be fully understood. Bagemihl's research shows that homosexual behavior, not necessarily sex, has been documented in about five hundred species as of 1999, ranging from primates to gut worms. Homosexuality in animals is seen as controversial by social conservatives because it asserts the naturalness of homosexuality in humans, while others counter that it has no implications and is nonsensical to equate natural animal behaviors to morality. Sexual preference and motivation is always inferred from behavior. Thus homosexual behavior has been given a number of terms over the years. The correct usage of the term homosexual is that an animal exhibits homosexual behavior, however this article conforms to the usage by modern research, applying the term homosexuality to all sexual behavior (copulation, genital stimulation, mating games and sexual display behavior) between animals of the same sex.

In October 2023, biologists reported studies of mammals (over 1,500 different species) that found same-sex behavior (not necessarily related to human orientation) may help improve social stability by reducing conflict within the groups studied.

== Mammals ==
Selected mammals from the full list

- Baboon
- Bison
- Bonobo
- Brown bear
- Brown Rat
- Cavy
- Caribou
- Cat (domestic)
- Cattle (domestic)
- Chimpanzee
- Common dolphin
- Common marmoset
- Dog
- Dolphin
- Elephant
- Fox
- Giraffe
- Goat
- Horse (domestic)
- Human
- Humpback whale
- Koala
- Lion
- Sheep
- Orca
- Southern right whale
- Wolf

== Birds ==
Homosexual behaviour is demonstrated by 120 known species of birds. While an uptick in research on bird homosexuality – and animal homosexuality in general – has been coming out in recent years, it is common for some authors to labour in articulating the view any root cause or function of bird homosexuality is poorly understood.

Hypotheses contrived in an attempt to explain the behaviour – homosexuality in birds – typically diverge from one another, further exacerbating an apparent perception in the concerned scientific communities knowledge's quest to realise bird homosexuality remains elusive as an objective. Some authors posit the behaviours are a result of any bird demonstrably homosexual being less inclined to rear young, while other authors posit the timing of emergence from the egg is a factor.

In 1977, The New York Times also reported on a colony of lesbian seagulls "off [the] coast of California."

Selected birds from the full list

- Barn owl
- Cassowary
- Black swan
- Chicken
- Common gull
- Emu
- Greylag goose
- House sparrow
- Kestrel
- King penguin
- Mallard
- Ostrich
- Raven
- Rock dove

== Fish ==
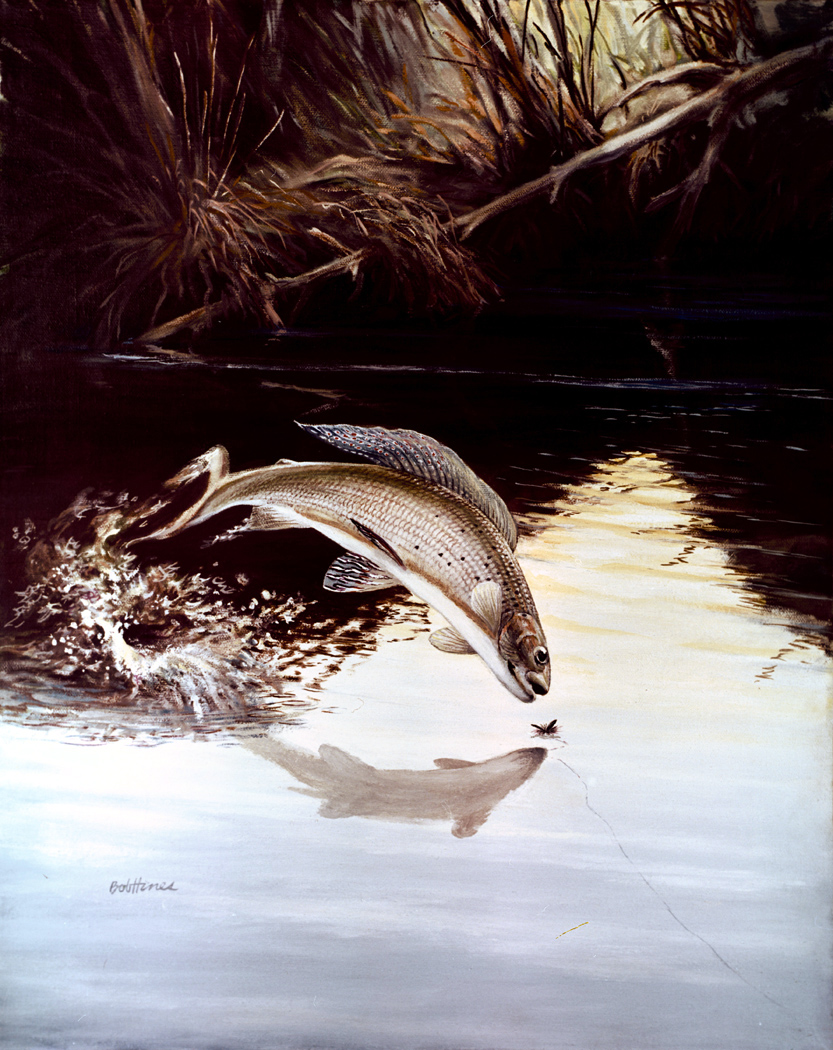
Arctic grayling (Thymallus arcticus) leaping for a fly fisherman's bait. Research going back to the 1950s has shown both male and female graylings exhibit homosexual behavior.

- Amazon molly
- Blackstripe topminnow
- Bluegill sunfish
- Char
- Grayling
- European bitterling
- Green swordtail
- Guiana leaffish
- Houting whitefish
- Jewel cichlid
- Least darter (Microperca punctulata)
- Mouthbreeding fish sp.
- Salmon spp.
- Southern platyfish
- Ten-spined stickleback
- Three-spined stickleback

== Reptiles ==
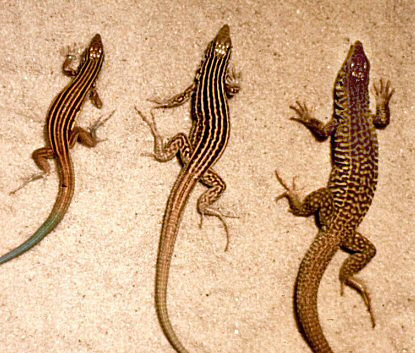
Three species of Aspidoscelis

The all-female Whiptail lizard species Aspidoscelis neomexicanus (center), which reproduces via parthenogenesis, is shown flanked by two sexual species having males, A. inornatus (left) and A. tigris (right). Research has shown that simulated mating behavior increases fertility for Aspidoscelis neomexicanus. One female lies on top of another, playing the role of the male, the lizard that was on bottom has larger eggs, in most cases. The lizards switch off this role each mating season.

- American alligator
- Anole sp.
- Bearded dragon
- Blue-tailed day gecko (Phelsuma cepediana)
- Broad-headed skink
- Checkered whiptail lizard
- Chihuahuan spotted whiptail lizard
- Common ameiva
- Common garter snake
- Cuban green anole
- Desert grassland whiptail lizard
- Desert tortoise
- Eastern fence lizard
- Five-lined skink
- Gold dust day gecko (Phelsuma laticauda)
- Gopher (pine) snake
- Green anole
- Inagua curlytail lizard
- Jamaican giant anole
- Laredo striped whiptail lizard
- Largehead anole
- Mourning gecko
- Plateau striped whiptail lizard
- Red diamond rattlesnake
- Red-tailed skink
- Seychelles giant tortoise
- Side-blotched lizard
- Speckled rattlesnake
- Spectacled Caiman
- Water moccasin
- Western rattlesnake (Crotalus viridis)
- Western banded gecko
- Whiptail lizard spp.
- Wood turtle
- Blue-tongued skink

== Amphibians ==
- Appalachian woodland salamander
- Black-spotted frog
- Mountain dusky salamander
- Tengger desert toad

== Insects ==
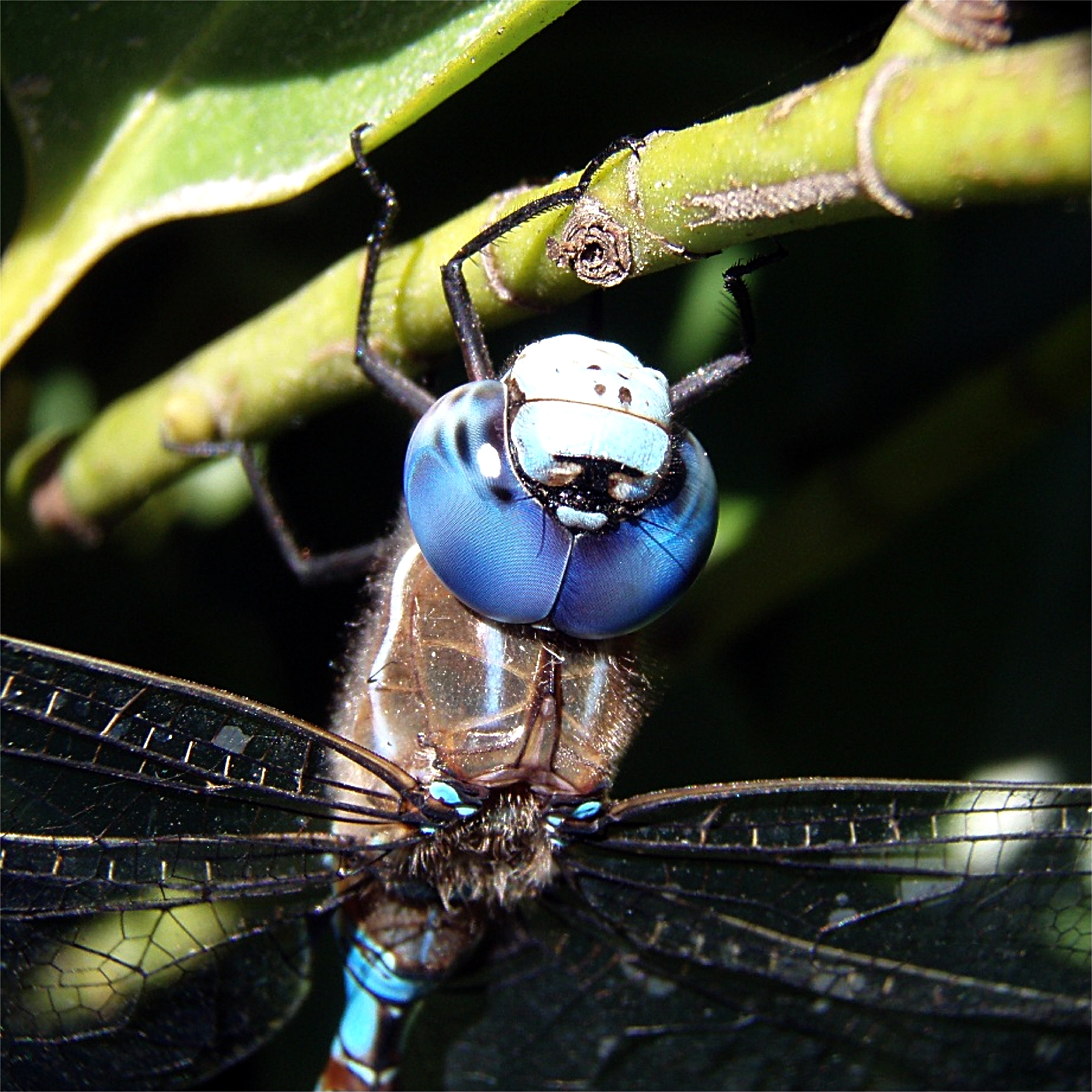
The head of a darner dragonfly (Basiaeschna janata)

Male homosexuality has been inferred in several species of dragonflies. A survey of damsel and dragonflies reveals characteristic cloacal pincher mating damage in 20–80 percent of the males, indicating a fairly high occurrence of sexual coupling between males.

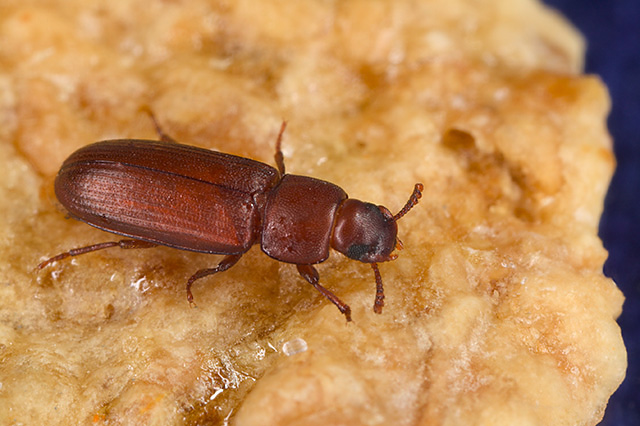
Male flour beetles engage in same-sex coupling to practice mating and to rid themselves of "old, less effective" sperm.

- Alfalfa weevil
- Australian parasitic wasp sp.
- Bean weevil sp.
- Bedbug and other bug spp.
- Blister beetle spp.
- Blowfly
- Broadwinged damselfly sp.
- Cabbage (small) white (butterfly)
- Checkerspot butterfly
- Club-tailed dragonfly spp.
- Cockroach spp.
- Codling moth
- Common skimmer dragonfly spp.
- Creeping water bug sp.
- Cutworm
- Digger bee
- Dragonfly spp.
- Eastern giant ichneumon wasp
- Eucalyptus longhorned borer
- Field cricket sp.
- Flour beetle
- Fruit fly spp.
- Glasswing butterfly
- Hypoponera opacior ant
- Grape borer
- Green lacewing
- Hen flea
- House fly
- Ichneumon wasp sp.
- Japanese scarab beetle
- Larch bud moth
- Large milkweed bug
- Large white
- Leek moth
- Long-legged fly spp.
- Mazarine blue
- Mexican white (butterfly)
- Midge sp.
- Migratory locust
- Monarch butterfly
- Narrow-winged damselfly spp.
- Parsnip leaf miner
- Peach moth
- Pomace fly
- Queen butterfly
- Red ant sp.
- Red flour beetle
- Rice moth
- Reindeer warble fly (Hypoderma tarandi)
- Rose chafer (Macrodactylus subspinosus)
- Rove beetle spp.
- Scarab beetle (melolonthine)
- Screwworm fly
- Southeastern blueberry bee
- Southern green stink bug
- Southern masked chafer
- Southern one-year canegrub
- Spreadwinged damselfly spp.
- Spruce budworm moth
- Stable fly sp.
- Stag beetle spp.
- Tsetse fly
- Tropical tasar silkmoth
- Vine moth
- Water boatman bug
- Water strider spp.

== Other invertebrates ==
- Blood-fluke
- Box crab
- Harvestman sp.
- Hawaiian orb-weaver (spider)
- Incirrate octopus spp.
- Jumping spiders
- Mite sp.
- Spiny-headed worm

== See also ==
- Against Nature?, an exhibit at the University of Oslo's Natural History Museum that took place until 19 August 2007.
- Anthropomorphism
- Behavioral ecology is the study of the ecological and evolutionary basis for animal behavior
- Biodiversity
- Bioethics
- Biology and sexual orientation
- Ethology is the scientific study of animal behavior, and a branch of zoology; cognitive ethology fuses cognitive science and classical ethology to observe animals under more-or-less natural conditions
- Evolutionary biology
- Homosexual behavior in animals § Birds
- Innate bisexuality
- Sexual selection

== Bibliography ==
- "Gay Penguins Resist 'Aversion Therapy'". 365Gay.com. 11 February 2005. Archived from the original on 29 September 2007.
- Bagemihl, Bruce (1999). Biological Exuberance: Animal Homosexuality and Natural Diversity. St. Martin's Press ISBN 0-312-19239-8
- Caramagno, Thomas C (2002). Irreconcilable Differences? Intellectual Stalemate in the Gay Rights Debate Archived 2009-07-09 at the Wayback Machine; Praeger/Greenwood, ISBN 0275977218.
- Cooper, J.B. "An Exploratory Study on African Lions" in Comparative Psychology Monographs 17:1-48.
- Cziko, Gary (2000) The Things We Do: Using the Lessons of Bernard and Darwin to Understand the What, How, and Why of Our Behavior; MIT Press, ISBN 0262032775.
- de Waal, Frans B. M. (2001) The Ape and The Sushi Master: Cultural Reflections by a Primatologist; Basic Books (chapter Bonobos and Fig Leaves).
- Dunkle, S.W. (1991), "Head damage from mating attempts in dragonflies (Odonata:Anisoptera)". Entomological News 102, pp. 37–41. Retrieved on 16 June 2010.
- Eaton, R. L. (1974). "The Biology and Social Behavior of Reproduction in the Lion" in Eaton, ed. The World's Cats, vol. II; pp. 3–58; Seattle.
- Forger, Nancy G., Laurence G. Frank, S. Marc Breedlove, Stephen E. Glickman (6 December 1998). "Sexual Dimorphism of Perineal Muscles and Motoneurons in Spotted Hyenas"; The Journal of Comparative Neurology, Volume 375, Issue 2, Pages 333 - 343. Retrieved 11 September 2007.
- "Gay Animals: Alternate Lifestyles in the Wild". Live Science. 20 September 2011.
- Gómez, Jose M.; Gónzalez-Megías, A.; Verdú, M. (3 October 2023). "The evolution of same-sex sexual behaviour in mammals". Nature Communications. 14 (1): 5719. Bibcode:2023NatCo..14.5719G. doi:10.1038/s41467-023-41290-x. PMC 10547684. PMID 37788987.
- Goudarzi, Sara (16 November 2006). "Gay Animals Out of the Closet?: First-ever Museum Display Shows 51 Species Exhibiting Homosexuality". MSNBC. Retrieved on 12 September 2007.
- Harrold, Max (February 16, 1999). "Creature Comforts". The Advocate. No. 779. pp. 61–62. "In his news book, Biological Exuberance: Animal Homosexuality and Natural Diversity ... author Bruce Bagemihl portrays an animal kingdom that embraces a whole spectrum of sexual orientations ... [and] paints a complex mosaic that resembles humanity ... At 751 pages and with photos and documentation of homosexual behaviour in more than 450 species of mammals, birds, repties, and insects, Biological Exuberance brings the dusty facts to light as Bagemihl deconstructs the all-heterosexual Noah's Ark we've been sold."
- Holekamp, Kay E. (2003). Research: Spotted Hyena - Introduction and Overview. Michigan State University, Department of Zoology]. Retrieved 16 June 2010.
- Hubert, Robert & Martys, Michael (1993). "Male-male Pairs in Greylag Geese (Anser anser)" Archived 2025-07-08 at the Wayback Machine. Journal of Ornithology. 134: 155–164.
- Jackson, Stephen M. (2 June 2025). Australian Mammals: Biology and Captive Management (2nd ed.). Melbourne: Csiro Publishing. ISBN 9-781486-315284.
- Kick, Russ (2001). You Are Being Lied to: The Disinformation Guide to Media Distortion, Historical Whitewashes and Cultural Myths. The Disinformation Company, ISBN 0966410076. Retrieved on 18 November 2007.
- Kishikawa, Hiroaki (April 27, 2021). "Toucans kept as couple at Japanese zoo for 8 years turn out to be both female". Sapporo, Japan: Mainichi.
- "The Science of Sex". 19 September 2007. Archived from the original on 2007-11-08.
- Liggett, Dave; Columbus Zoo and Aquarium staff. "African Forest: Bonobo". Columbus Zoo and Aquarium. Archived from the original on June 2, 2002. "...frequent sex (including male-to-male and female-to-female) characterize bonobo society."
- News-medical.net (23 October 2006). "1,500 Animal Species Practice Homosexuality" Retrieved on 10 September 2007.
- Poiani, Aldo (2010). Animal Homosexuality: A Biosocial Perspective. Cambridge University Press.
- Roselli, Charles E., Kay Larkin, John A. Resko, John N. Stellflug and Fred Stormshak (2004). "The Volume of a Sexually Dimorphic Nucleus in the Ovine Medial Preoptic Area/Anterior Hypothalamus Varies with Sexual Partner Preference". Endocrinology, Department of Physiology and Pharmacology, Oregon Health & Science University (C.E.R., K.L., J.A.R.), Portland, Oregon; Department of Animal Sciences, Oregon State University (F.S.), Corvallis, Oregon; and Agricultural Research Service, United States Sheep Experiment Station (J.N.S.), Dubois, Idaho, Vol. 145, No. 2. Retrieved on 10 September 2007.
- Roughgarden, Joan (2004). Evolutions Rainbow: Diversity, Gender and Sexuality in Nature and People; University of California Press, Berkeley, pages p. 13-183.
- Schaller, G. B. (1972). The Serengeti Lion; University of Chicago Press.
- Smith, Dinitia (7 February 2004). "Love That Dare Not Squeak Its Name" New York Times. Retrieved on 10 September 2007. Reprinted as "Central Park Zoo's Gay Penguins Ignite Debate", San Francisco Chronicle.
- Sommer, Volker & Paul L. Vasey (2006). Homosexual Behaviour in Animals, An Evolutionary Perspective. Cambridge University Press, Cambridge; ISBN 0521864461.
- Srivastav, Suvira (15–31 December 2001). "Lion, Without Lioness"
- Stein, Edward (1999) The Mismeasure of Desire: The Science, Theory, and Ethics of Sexual Orientation; Oxford University Press, US; ISBN 0195142446.
- Tatarnic, Nikolai J., Gerasimos Cassis, Dieter F. Hochuli; 22 March 2006 "Traumatic insemination in the plant bug genus Coridromius Signoret (Heteroptera: Miridae)" Archived 2018-08-17 at the Wayback Machine Biology Letters Journal Volume 2, Number 1, pg 58-61: Royal Society Publishing; Retrieved 16 June 2010.
- Terry, Jennifer (2000) "'Unnatural Acts' In Nature: The Scientific Fascination with Queer Animals"; GLQ: A Journal of Lesbian and Gay Studies (6(2):151–193; OI:10.1215/10642684-6-2-151); Duke University Press.
- Utzeri, C. & C. Belfiore (1990): "Anomalous tandems in Odonata". Fragmenta Entomologica 22(2), pp. 271–288. Retrieved 11 September 2007.
- Vasey, Paul L. (1995), "Homosexual Behaviour in Primates: A Review of Evidence and Theory"; International Journal of Primatology 16: p 173-204.
- Vilet, Kent A. (2000), "Courtship behaviour of American Alligators, Alligator mississippiensis"; Crocodilian Biology and Evolution, pages 383–408
- Wilson, Anna (2003). "Sexing the Hyena: Intraspecies Readings of the Female Phallus". Signs. 28 (3). University of Chicago Press: 755–790. doi:10.1086/345320. JSTOR 10.1086/345320. S2CID 146640802.
- Zimmer, Carl (2000); Parasite Rex: Inside the Bizarre World of Nature's Most Dangerous Creatures; Simon and Schuster, ISBN 0743213718. Retrieved 18 November 2007.
