= Bulling (cattle) =

Behaviour seen in cattle

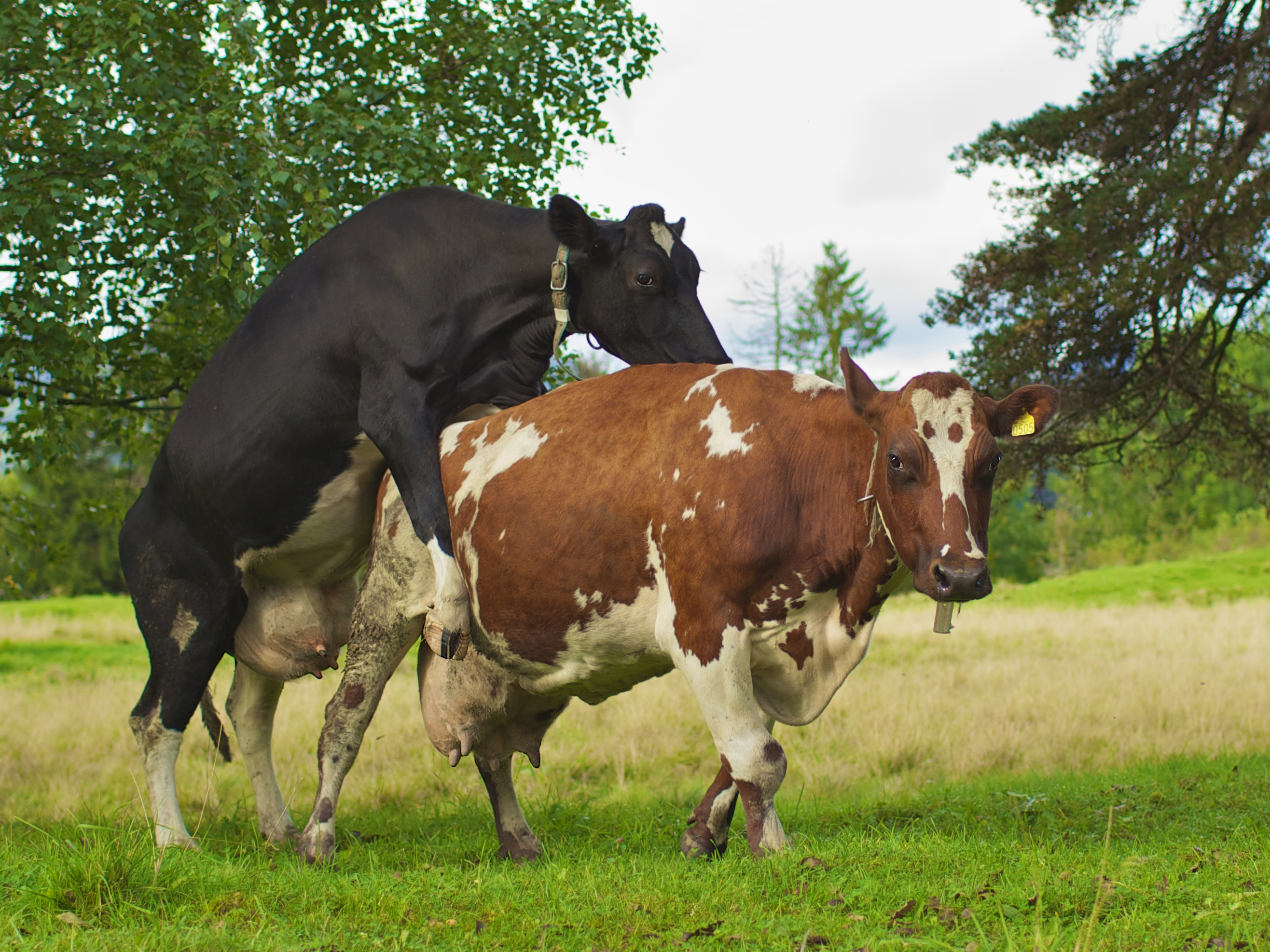
A cow mounting another cow

Bulling is a behaviour seen in cattle (and other mammals) when one mounts another, usually when one is a female in oestrus (heat). "Bulling" is commonly used as a term for a female in oestrus.

Female cattle in oestrus may mount any adult cattle, especially a bull (fertile male) if one is present, but they will also mount castrated males or other females. A bulling female will often also be mounted by other cattle, both male and female, though only fertile males are usually capable of mating. A dominant bull will defend the bulling female from being mounted by other cattle.

Bulling is used by farmers to recognise oestrus, which is important to determine the fertile period when cows may be artificially inseminated. Care is needed to identify whether the animal in oestrus is the one mounting or being mounted, and sometimes both animals may be in oestrus.

Mounting behaviour is also sometimes seen between adult cattle in the absence of a female in oestrus.

== See also ==
- List of mammals displaying homosexual behavior
