= Homosexual behavior in sheep =

Same-sex sexual behavior among sheep

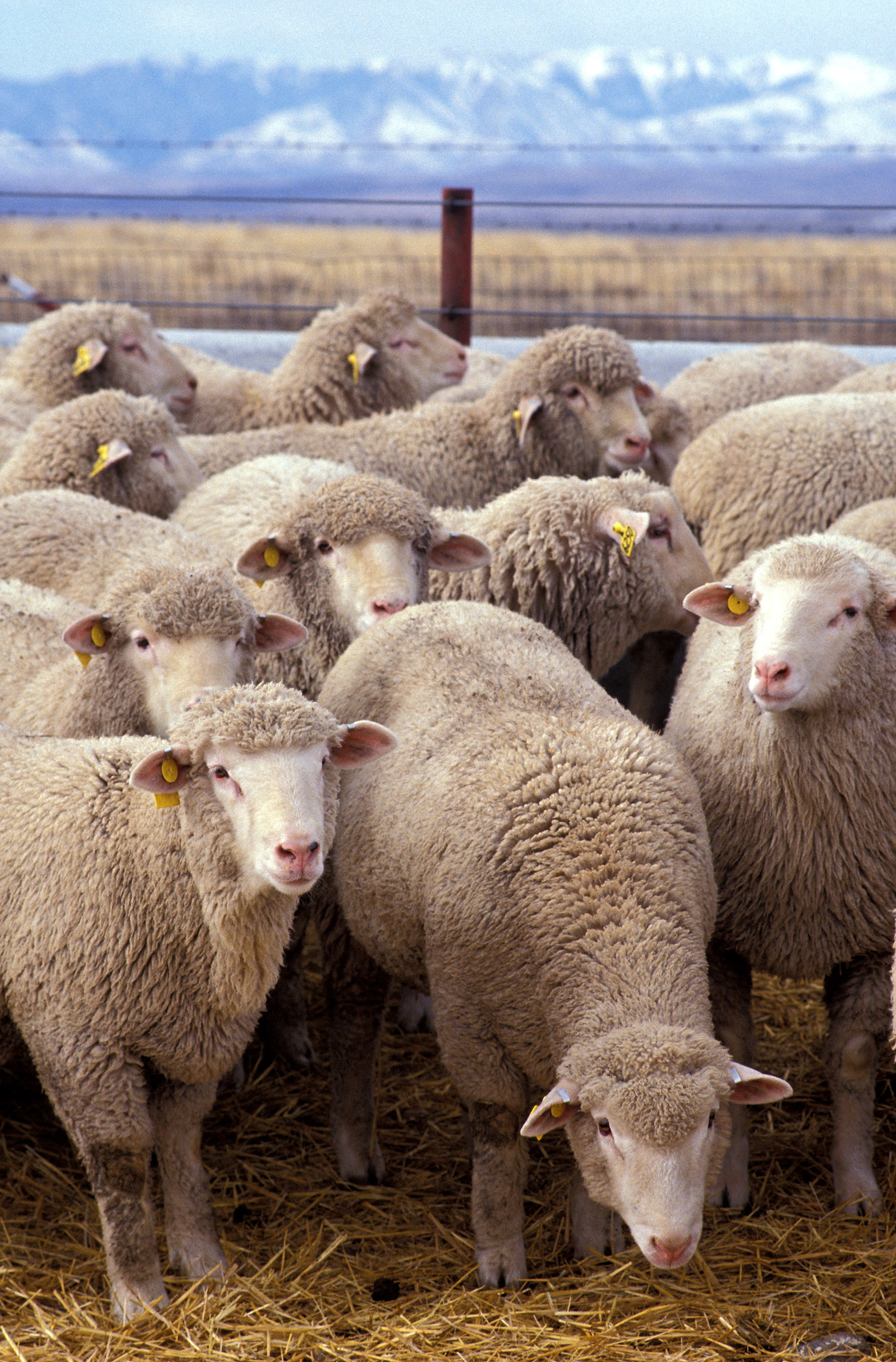
Flock of domestic sheep

Homosexual behavior in sheep is common and well documented in domestic sheep (Ovis aries) and at least four species of wild sheep (members of the genus Ovis). About 8% to 10% of domestic rams (male sheep) refuse to mate with ewes (female sheep) but do readily mate with other rams, making them the only known mammal besides humans to exhibit exclusively same-sex sexual behavior. Around 18% to 30% of all domestic rams demonstrate at least some homosexual behavior. Male domestic sheep's homosexual behavior and preference has received much academic discussion.

Several observations indicate that male–male sexual preference in rams is sexually motivated. Rams routinely perform the same courtship behaviors (including foreleg kicks, nudges, vocalizations, anogenital sniffs and flehmen) prior to mounting other males as observed when other rams court and mount estrous females. Furthermore, pelvic thrusting and ejaculation often accompany same-sex mounts by rams. Additionally, a small number of females that were accompanied by a male fetus in utero (i.e. as fraternal twins) are freemartins (female animals with intersex characteristics like being behaviorally masculine and lacking functioning ovaries).

== Biological causes ==
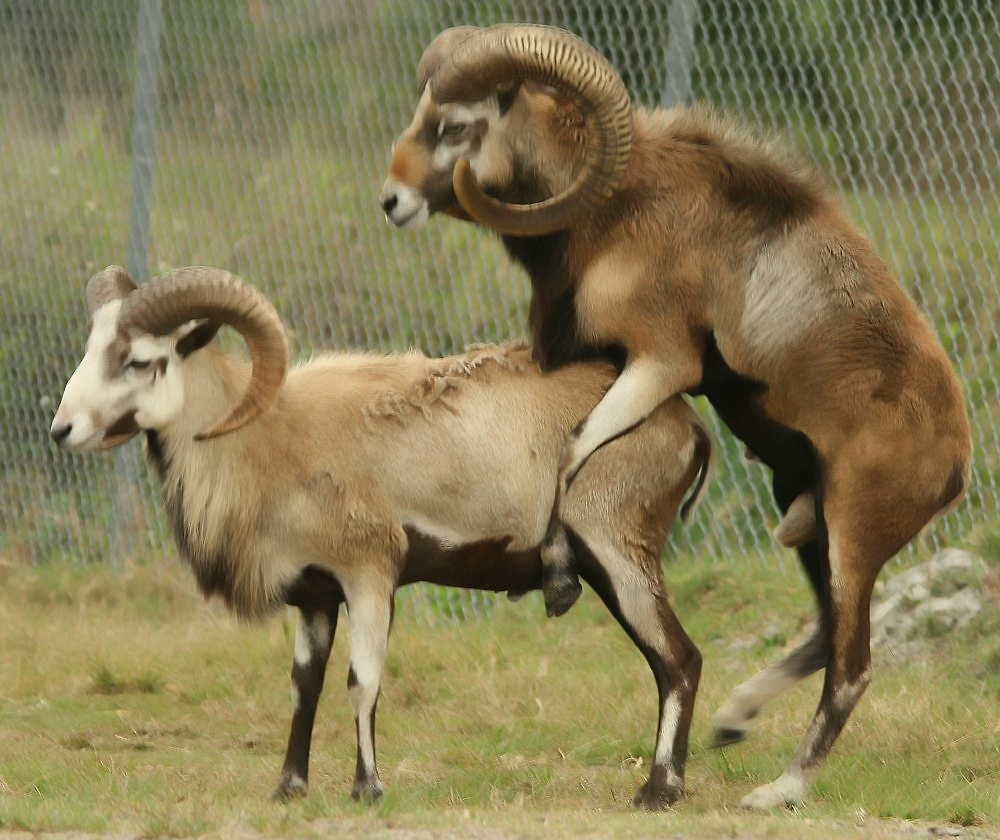
A male sheep mounting another male

A number of studies have reported differences in brain structure and function between male-oriented and female-oriented rams, suggesting that sexual partner preferences are neurologically hard-wired. Long-term studies of homosexual behavior in domesticated sheep led by Charles Roselli have found that 6-8% of rams have a homosexual preference throughout their life. Dissection of ram brains also found a similar smaller (feminized) structure in homosexually oriented rams compared to heterosexually oriented rams in the equivalent brain region to the human sexually dimorphic nucleus (SDN), the ovine sexually dimorphic nucleus (oSDN).

The size of the sheep oSDN has also been demonstrated to be formed in utero, rather than postnatally, underscoring the role of prenatal hormones in masculinization of the brain for sexual attraction. Their 2003 study at Oregon Health and Science University stated that homosexuality in male sheep is associated with a region in the rams' brains which the authors call the "ovine Sexually Dimorphic Nucleus" (oSDN) which is half the size of the corresponding region in heterosexual male sheep. Scientists found that, "The oSDN in rams that preferred females was significantly larger and contained more neurons than in male-oriented rams and ewes. In addition, the oSDN of the female-oriented rams expressed higher levels of aromatase, a substance that converts testosterone to estradiol, a form of estrogen which is believed to facilitate typical male sexual behaviors.

Aromatase expression was no different between male-oriented rams and ewes [...] The dense cluster of neurons that comprise the oSDN express cytochrome P450 aromatase. Aromatase mRNA levels in the oSDN were significantly greater in female-oriented rams than in ewes, whereas male-oriented rams exhibited intermediate levels of expression." These results suggest that "... naturally occurring variations in sexual partner preferences may be related to differences in brain anatomy and its capacity for estrogen synthesis." As noted before, given the potential unaggressiveness of the male population in question, the differing aromatase levels may also have been evidence of aggression levels, not sexuality. It should also be noted that the results of this particular study have not been confirmed by other studies.

Average volumes of the equivalent cell group in sheep (oSDN) for heterosexual and homosexual rams and for ewes. Sex differences are formed under the influence of prenatal hormones in utero, rather than acquired after birth.
Heterosexually oriented rams
Homosexually oriented rams
Ewes (females)
View source data.

Sheep are one of the few animals where the molecular basis of the diversity of male sexual preferences has been examined. However, this research has been controversial, and much publicity has been produced by a study at the Oregon Health and Science University that investigated the mechanisms that produce homosexuality in rams. Organizations such as PETA campaigned against the study, accusing scientists of trying to cure homosexuality in the sheep. OHSU and the involved scientists vehemently denied such accusations.

=== Research on potential social factors ===
Studies have failed to identify any compelling social factors that can predict or explain the variations in sexual partner preferences of domestic rams. Homosexual orientation and same-sex mounting in rams is not related to dominance, social rank or competitive ability. Indeed, male-oriented rams are not more or less dominant than female-oriented rams. Homosexual orientation in rams is also not affected by rearing conditions, i.e., rearing males in all-male groups, rearing male and female lambs together, early exposure of adolescent males to females and early social experiences with females do not promote or prevent homosexual orientation in rams. Male-oriented partner preference also does not appear to be an artifact caused by captivity or human management of sheep.

== Homosexual behavior among other sheep species ==
Homosexual courtship and sexual activity routinely occur among rams of wild sheep species, such as bighorn sheep (Ovis canadensis), thinhorn sheep (Ovis dalli), mouflons (Ovis gmelini), and urials (Ovis orientalis). Usually a higher ranking older male courts a younger male using a sequence of stylized movements. To initiate homosexual courtship, a courting male approaches the other male with his head and neck lowered and extended far forward in what is called the 'low-stretch' posture. He may combine this with the 'twist,' in which the courting male sharply rotates his head and points his muzzle toward the other male, often while flicking his tongue and making grumbling sounds. The courting male also often performs a 'foreleg kick', in which he snaps his front leg up against the other male's belly or between his hind legs. He also occasionally sniffs and nuzzles the other male's genital area and may perform the flehmen response. Thinhorn rams additionally lick the penis of the male they are courting. In response, the male being courted may rub his cheeks and forehead on the courting male's face, nibble and lick him, rub his horns on the courting male's neck, chest, or shoulders, and develop an erection. Males of the mouflon perform similar courtship behaviors towards fellow males.

Sexual activity between wild males typically involves mounting and anal intercourse. In Thinhorn sheep, genital licking also occurs. During mounting, the larger male usually mounts the smaller male by rearing up on his hind legs and placing his front legs on his partner's flanks. The mounting male usually has an erect penis and accomplishes full anal penetration while performing pelvic thrusts that may lead to ejaculation. The mounted male arches his back to facilitate the copulation. Homosexual courtship and sexual activity can also take place in groups composed of three to ten wild rams clustered together in a circle. These non-aggressive groups are called 'huddles' and involve rams rubbing, licking, nuzzling, horning, and mounting each other. Female Mountain sheep also engage in occasional courtship activities with one another and in sexual activities such as licking each other's genitals and mounting.

== See also ==
- Non-reproductive sexual behavior in animals
- Homosexuality and psychology
- List of animals displaying homosexual behavior
