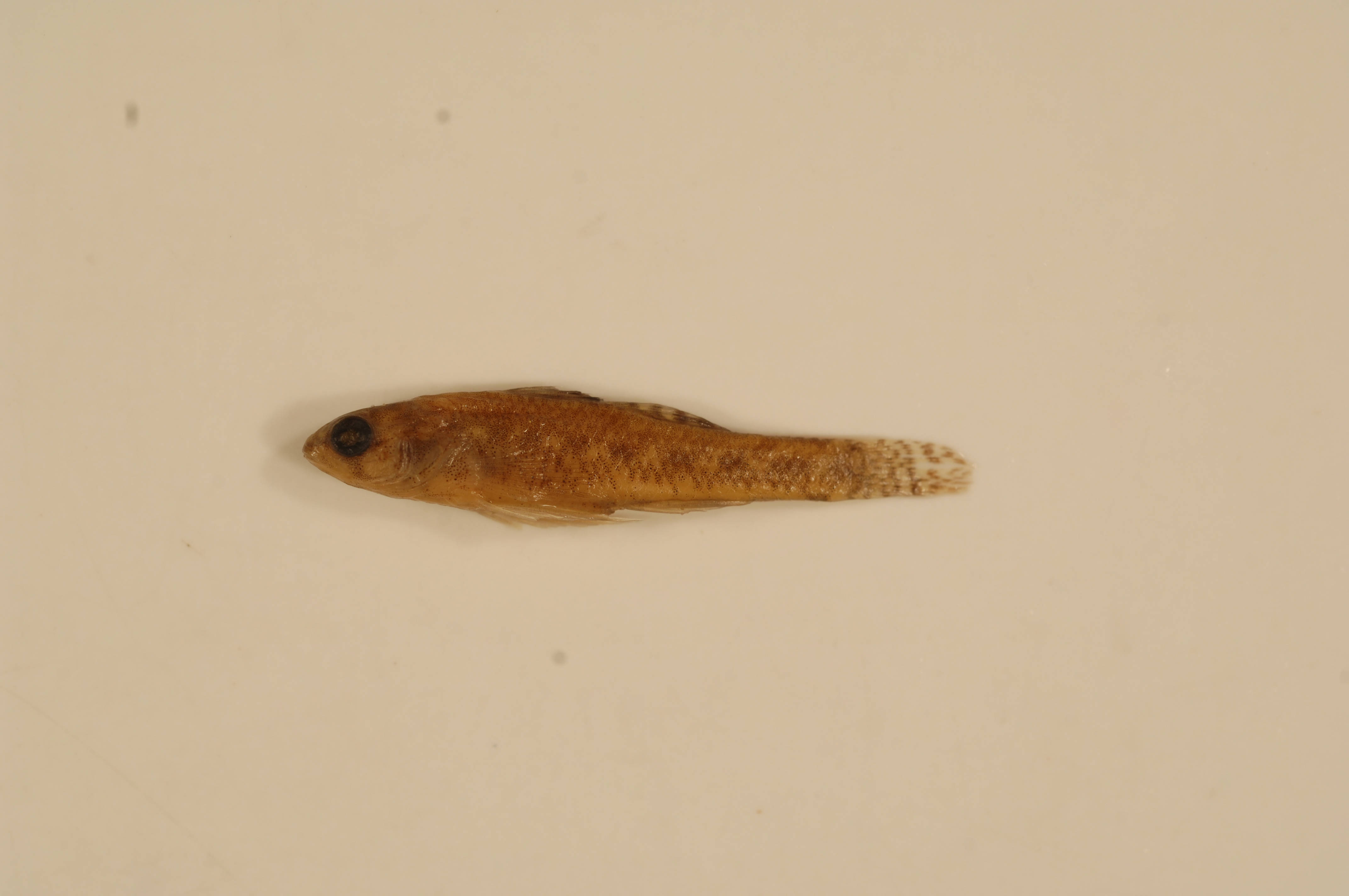

Conservation status
- Least Concern (IUCN 3.1)

Scientific classification
- Kingdom: Animalia
- Phylum: Chordata
- Class: Actinopterygii
- Order: Perciformes
- Family: Percidae
- Genus: Etheostoma
- Species: E. microperca

Binomial name
- Etheostoma microperca D. S. Jordan & C. H. Gilbert, 1888

= Least darter =

Species of fish

The least darter (Etheostoma microperca), is a species of freshwater ray-finned fish, a darter from the subfamily Etheostomatinae, part of the family Percidae, which also contains the perches, ruffes and pikeperches. It is generally found in lakes and streams in northeastern part of the United States and along the Mississippi River systems.

== Description ==
Etheostoma microperca fish are very small in body size, typically are 25–35 mm (1–1 3/8 in) long with a maximum of about 45 mm (1 3/4 in). Their main color is an overall light olive brown covered in darker brown speckles. The lateral line is often absent, or when it is present, it is very short. They have seven to 15 dark blotches along their sides which are wider than they are tall. The second dorsal and tail fins have many small dark spots that form wavy rows. E. microperca also has a distinct teardrop-shaped spot under the eyes and often several other dark lines radiating outward from the eyes on their heads and snouts. The breeding males have a band of red spots in the middle of their first dorsal fins. Males also have oversized pelvic fins, and their pectoral, pelvic, and anal fins are flushed with orange or red. The females look very similar to males, but are lacking any of the red or orange and have smaller pelvic fins. Their fins are spotted and lightly pigmented. They have a fusiform to cylindrical body shape that is slightly elongated and are slightly laterally compressed anteriorly and are round to oval in cross section. In perciform teleosts, the posterior, exposed part of each scale bears tiny tooth-like projections (cteni) – ctenoid scales. This species has 32–38 of these ctenoid lateral scales. Their tails, dorsal fins, and other fins are rounded or squared. The dorsal fin has two lobes, slightly separated, the first with five to seven spines and the second with 9–10 rays. The pelvic fins are thoracic, and their anal fins have one or two spines and five or six rays. The pectoral fins in this darter species may function in vertical movement, as well as in low-speed maneuvering, as these fish lack swim bladders. Their pectoral fins can also be used for braking and may be used to maintain position in strong currents. Therefore, these pectorals have multiple functions and make pectoral fin length an equivocal habitat indication for the bladderless darters.

== Distribution and habitat ==
The fish species, Etheostoma microperca, is distributed across the northeastern part of the United States, particularly in the midwest. This fish is also one of the 324 fish species found in Tennessee, and has been found in other states, such as Minnesota, Illinois, and Ohio, and many others. As of 2008, it had been documented at a limited number of sites across the southern two-thirds of Minnesota, but most of its populations occurred in the west-central portion of the state in the Otter Tail River and upper Mississippi River drainages.

Adults of E. microperca are usually found in streams near vegetation, such as along overhanging grassy banks and among filamentous algae. Juveniles are mainly found in thick growths of algae along the edges of streams. These fish are rarely found in midstream or away from vegetation; they are found exclusively near the edges of streams in quieter water to avoid the strong currents. They mainly reside in natural lakes and permanent wetlands that contain large amounts of aquatic vegetation and clear waters.

== Diet ==
Adapted for feeding on prey active on and around plants, the species has a terminal mouth, orienting the opening towards prey anterior to the fish. With its long peduncle, long pectoral fins, and laterally compressed body, E. microperca is able to be fast and efficient in capturing its prey. The preferred prey are Batidae nymphs, Tanytarsini (e.g. Tantarsus) and Orthocladiinae (e.g. Corynoneura, Cricotopus). Small items, such as microcrustaceans and Chironomidae, are also important in the diet of E. micoperca. These prey are very small, as this particular species is very small itself in body size and mouth.

== Lifecycle ==
Etheostoma microperca will migrate from the deeper pools of streams to shallow, weedy habitats from March to May. During spawning, males develop three-dimensional territories of about 30 cm (12 in) in diameter and defend them from other males. Females enter a male's territory and spawn on pieces of aquatic vegetation. Females will travel through many males' territories and can lay about 30 eggs per day. Least darters are a short-lived species; in Minnesota, they live 2–3 yr. By early January, the male's genital papilla begins to swell, and by late March or early April, the testes are enlarged and sexually mature. They also develop lateral flaps of skin on their pelvic fins as early as late January, and by mid-March their breeding colors are evident. The female's genital papilla is also enlarged up to the spawning period, but her color and pattern changes very little. Over time, ova develop into eggs. The spawning position of E. microperca is almost always vertical; horizontal positioning during successful egg-laying is only occasionally observed. Males tend to spawn with several females. Males also guard small territories from other males and also guard the eggs until they hatch.

== Conservation ==
Habitat loss and degradation are the greatest threats to least darter populations. They are vulnerable to pollution, pesticides, agricultural and urban runoff, eutrophication, and loss of habitat elements, such as low-velocity waters and aquatic vegetation. Other potential threats to this species include loss of forested habitats around streams, stream reclamation, and the introduction of non-native and predatory fish species. Maintenance of high-quality water systems is recommended for this species. Water systems with large populations of least darters should be protected from human disturbances and development.
