= Against Nature? =

Norwegian exhibition on homosexuality in animals

Against Nature? was an exhibition on homosexuality in animals made by the Natural History Museum at the University of Oslo, Norway. The exhibition focused on the occurrence and function of homosexuality in animals. It opened on 12 October 2006 and ran until 19 August 2007.

== History ==
The exhibit contained pictures, models and specimens of species known to engage in homosexuality, showing among other things southern right whales and giraffes engaged in same-sex pairing. The museum said one of its aims was to "help to de-mystify homosexuality among people... we hope to reject the all too well known argument that homosexual behaviour is a crime against nature." The display presented a selection from the more than 1,500 species in which homosexual behaviour has been observed, according to project coordinator Petter Bockman. Much of the exhibition drew on the work of Bruce Bagemihl, whose book Biological Exuberance formed the basis for the exhibition, as well as that of Joan Roughgarden.

The exhibition was initiated as part of "Break" (Norwegian: Brudd), a programme launched in 2003 to encourage Norwegian museums, libraries and archives to research and exhibit marginal, taboo and controversial subjects; the initiative came from cultural authorities rather than from within the museums themselves. It received financial support from the Norwegian Archive, Library and Museum Authority (ABM).

== Reception ==
The exhibition opened despite condemnation from some religious commentators, one of whom said the organisers should "burn in hell". Despite the initial objections, it was well received by museum visitors, including families.

== See also ==
- Sexual orientation and biology
