= Marc Breedlove =

American neuroscientist, psychologist

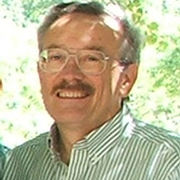
- Born: 1954 (age 71–72); Springfield, Missouri, U.S.
- Education: Yale University (BA); UCLA (PhD)
- Known for: Research on biological influences on sexual orientation
- Scientific career
- Fields: Behavioral neuroscience; Neuroendocrinology
- Workplaces: University of California, Berkeley; Michigan State University
- Website: marcbreedlove.com

Stephen Marc Breedlove (born 1954) is the Barnett Rosenberg professor of neuroscience at Michigan State University in East Lansing, Michigan. He was born and raised in the Ozarks of southwestern Missouri. After graduating from Central High School (Springfield, Missouri) in 1972, he earned a bachelor's degree in psychology from Yale University in 1976, and a PhD in psychology from UCLA in 1982. He was a professor of psychology at the University of California, Berkeley from 1982 to 2003, moving to Michigan State in 2001. He works in the fields of behavioral neuroscience and neuroendocrinology. He is a member of the Society for Neuroscience and the Society for Behavioral Neuroendocrinology, and a fellow of the Association for Psychological Science (APS) and the Biological Sciences section of the American Association for the Advancement of Science (AAAS).

== Research ==
In numerous papers, Breedlove has demonstrated that steroid hormones and sexual behavior affect the developing and adult spinal cord and brain. He also reported that the average digit ratio of lesbians is more masculine than that of straight women, a finding that has been replicated in his and many other labs and which indicates that lesbians, on average, are exposed to more prenatal testosterone than are straight women. This finding joins many others that biological influences, such as prenatal testosterone and fraternal birth order, act before birth to affect the later unfolding of human sexual orientation.

He is sole author of two textbooks, Principles of Psychology and Foundations of Neural Development, and has co-authored textbooks in biological psychology and behavioral neuroendocrinology.

A 2009 study co-authored by Breedlove examined whether post-traumatic stress disorder might contribute to erectile dysfunction. Male rats subjected to single prolonged stress, an experimental protocol that models PTSD, showed reduced gastrin-releasing peptide (GRP) in the lumbar spinal cord and weakened penile reflexes. Treatment with a GRP receptor agonist restored the reflexes. The authors proposed the spinal GRP system as a possible therapeutic target for psychogenic erectile dysfunction in men with PTSD.

He also researched how GRP in the lumbar spinal cord could be pharmacologically stimulated to restore male reproductive function. It was found that female rats and male rats with non-functional androgen receptors had only a vestigial GRP system in this region. Once GRP receptors were stimulated in castrated male rats, penile reflexes and ejaculation were restored. During the experiment, simple erections, dorsal flips of the penis, and cup-like flaring erections of the distal glans were measured in the rats before and after administration of a GRP receptor agonist.

Breedlove examined the sex differences in animals to gain an understanding of the sex differences in humans. As a graduate student at UCLA, he and his doctoral advisor Arthur P. Arnold discovered the spinal nucleus of the bulbocavernosus (SNB), a sexually dimorphic motor nucleus in the lumbar spinal cord of rats. It was found in rats that the males had higher cell numbers in the SNB than the female rats. These motor neurons appear in both male and female rats at birth, but die off in the female rats during early development. Testosterone was also found to be the key hormone that is responsible for the differences between males and females by preventing this perinatal cell death in males.

Breedlove researched the sexual preferences of homosexual men. Using personal ads from homosexual and heterosexual men, it was found that the two groups did not vary in mating preferences. Even though their partnerships with men cannot produce offspring, homosexual males, like heterosexual males, prefer to be with a younger partner. The authors concluded that both groups' partner preferences were independent of reproductive considerations.

== See also ==
- Biology and sexual orientation
- Prenatal hormones and sexual orientation
- Sexual orientation
