= Bruce Bagemihl =

Canadian biologist

Bruce Bagemihl (1962-) is a Canadian linguist and cognitive scientist, and author of the book Biological Exuberance: Animal Homosexuality and Natural Diversity.

== Life and career ==
He completed a BA at the University of Wisconsin–Milwaukee in 1981, and served on the faculty of the University of British Columbia, where he taught linguistics and cognitive science. He completed a PhD at UBC in linguistics in 1988, with a dissertation entitled Alternate phonologies and morphologies.

Biological Exuberance cites numerous studies on more than 450 species (see List of animals displaying homosexual behavior) showing that homosexual and bisexual behaviors are common among animals and proposes a theory of sexual behavior in which reproduction is only one of its principal biological functions. Bagemihl proposes that group cohesion and lessening of tensions, seen for example among bonobos, are other important functions of sexual behavior. He also argues that the implications for humans of homosexual behaviour across the animal kingdom are "enormous."

His book on homosexuality in animals was cited by the American Psychiatric Association and other groups in their amici curiae brief to the United States Supreme Court in Lawrence v. Texas, the case which ultimately struck down sodomy laws across the United States. The book formed the basis for the museum exhibition Against Nature?.

He has also published several essays and scientific articles on issues related to language, biology, gender, and sexuality.

== Selected publications ==
- Bruce Bagemihl. 1988. The morphology and phonology of Katajjait (Inuit throat games). Canadian Journal of Linguistics/Revue canadienne de linguistique 33(1), 1-58.
- Bruce Bagemihl. 1999. Biological Exuberance: Animal Homosexuality and Natural Diversity. St. Martin’s Press.
- Bruce Bagemihl. 2001. Animals Do Do It. Alternatives Journal 27(3), 36.
