= Biological Exuberance =

1999 nonfiction book

- Author: Bruce Bagemihl
- Illustrator: John Megahan
- Publisher: St. Martin's Press
- Publication date: January 15, 1999
- ISBN: 0-312-19239-8

Biological Exuberance: Animal Homosexuality and Natural Diversity is a 1999 nonfiction book by Canadian biologist Bruce Bagemihl with illustrations by John Megahan. The book, which describes examples of gender variance and homosexual behavior in animals, may be considered an early example of queer ecology, as it argues that queerness is as natural as heterosexuality due to its occurrence in non-human animals. The book compiles more than two centuries of relevant observations in over 400 species and was the first comprehensive book to be published on the topic.

== Contents ==
Biological Exuberance is separated into two parts. Part I, "A Polysexual, Polygendered World" discusses sexual behaviors in non-human animals as well as historical perspectives on animal homosexuality research and human attitudes towards such behaviors. Bagemihl examines and challenges the scientific assumptions that had been used to explain away or ignore the existence of homosexual behaviors in animals. Part II, "A Wondrous Bestiary" is a catalogue and discussion of scientifically observed variations of sexual behaviors in species of mammals and birds, with an attached appendix documenting such behaviors in insects, reptiles, amphibians, and fish. Few of the observations that Bagemihl references included photographs, with some of them having been documented before the invention of the camera, so scientific illustrator John Megahan was brought on to the project to provide illustrations.

== Reception and influence ==
A book review published in BioScience in 1999 calls the book "timely and original yet flawed", praising Bagemihl's writing style and contribution towards showing the richness of animal sexual behavior while finding weakness in how he attempts to raise and answer questions regarding homosexuality and evolution. A 2001 review in JAMA found Bagemihl's evidence of non-procreative heterosexual and homosexual behaviors in animals to be a convincing argument against the idea that such behaviors are "wrong" in humans, and that the book filled a void of scholarly accessible information on animal homosexuality.

Biological Exuberance was cited in an amicus curiae brief in Lawrence v. Texas, the case which struck down sodomy laws in the United States, and inspired "the first exhibition in the world dedicated to gay animals" entitled Against Nature? at the Natural History Museum of Oslo. The book also inspired Canadaland podcast A Field Guide to Gay Animals.
