= Prostitution among animals =

Prostitution among animals is the phenomenon in which non-human animals practice transactional sex. Transactional sex has been noted in various species of primates, including chimpanzees.

== Penguins ==
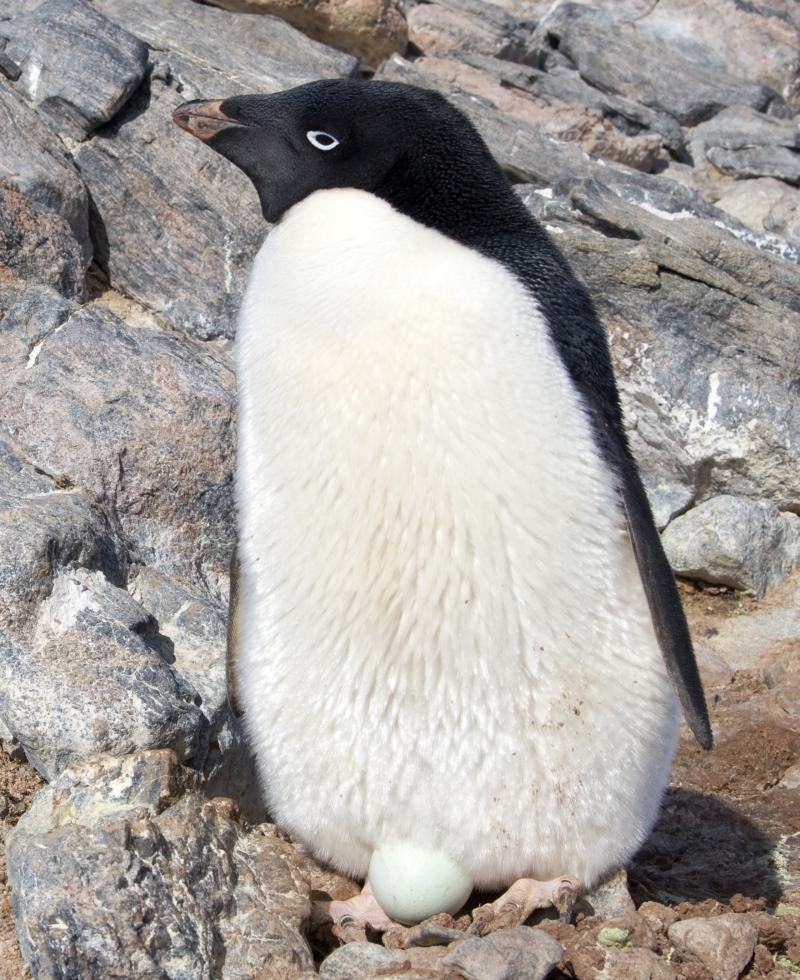
Adélie penguin

Prostitution in animals was first reported in 1998 by Fiona B. Hunter, a researcher at the University of Cambridge, and Lloyd Davis, of University of Otago, who had spent five years observing the mating behavior of Adélie penguins. The study was conducted as part of an Antarctica New Zealand program on Ross Island, approximately 800 miles (1,300 km) from the South Pole. According to the paper, titled Female Adélie Penguins Acquire Nest Material from Extrapair Males after Engaging in Extrapair Copulations, extra-pair copulation occurs at the male's nesting site, after which the female takes one or more stones that can be used to build a nest. In contrast, when extra-pair copulation occurs at the female's nesting site, the male does not take a stone. A male who has copulated with a female benefits his progeny when she takes a stone from him. Sometimes, copulation does not occur, but the female still takes a stone. Both males and females steal stones; sometimes they are successful, but at other times, they are attacked. The researchers observed that some females are not always willing to copulate in order to avoid a fight. The researchers speculated about the possible genetic fitness advantages and disadvantages of the practice, and were not sure that the female copulates mainly in order to obtain a stone.

Hunter subsequently said that female penguins probably do not engage in prostitution solely for stones. She said: "... what they are doing is having copulation for another reason and just taking the stones as well. We do not know exactly why, but they are using the males." This behavior was also suggested as a mate choice process, by which the females might find a possible future mate. This would provide a female penguin with another male penguin should their current mate die. According to Hunter's observation, the number of prostitute penguins was "only a few percent."

== Chimpanzees ==
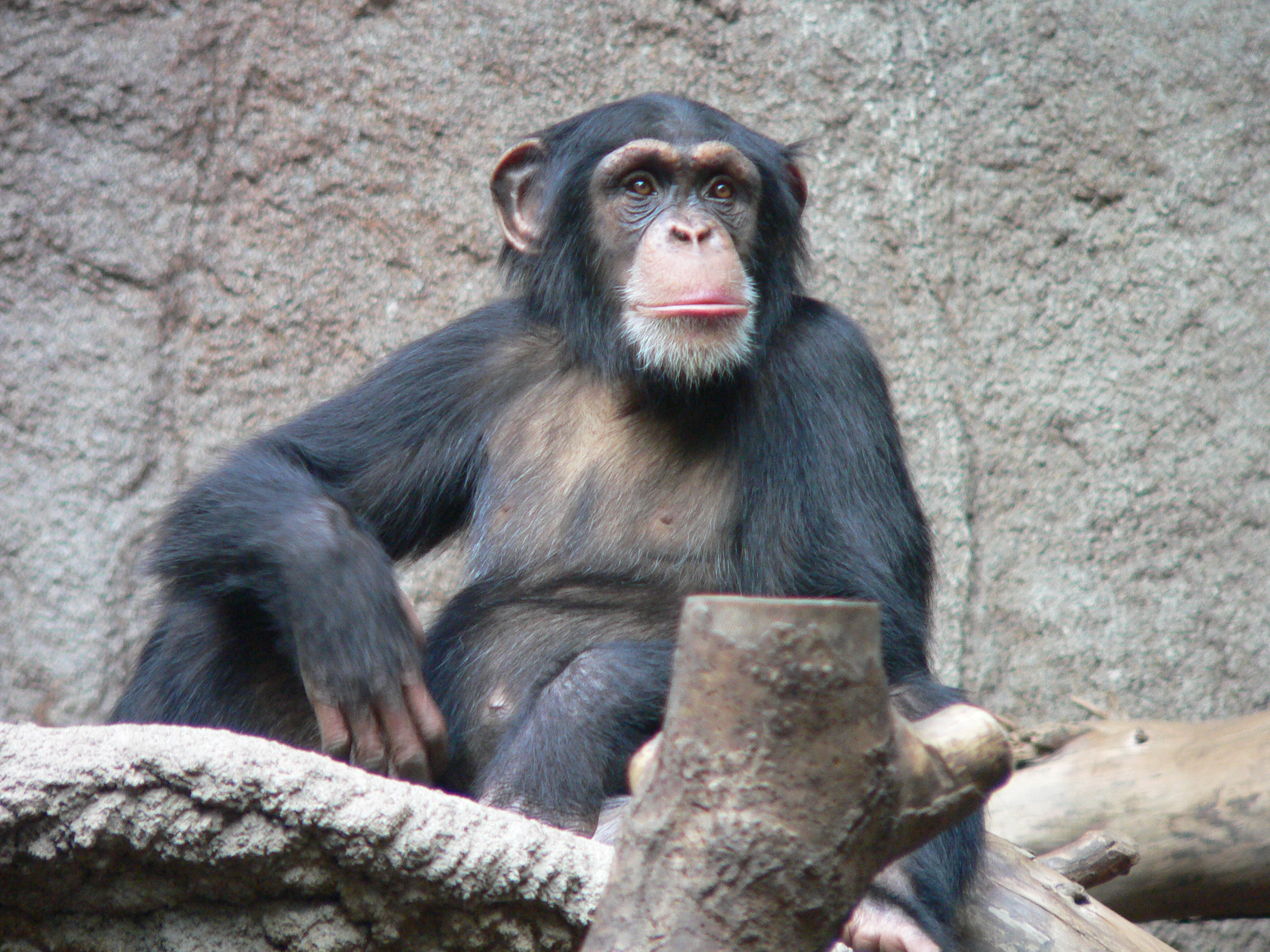
Pan troglodytes, similar to those observed in the Taï National Park

A study conducted by the Max Planck Institute for Evolutionary Anthropology in Leipzig, Germany, and published online in the Public Library of Science attempted to support the meat-for-sex behavior hypothesis, according to which the best male hunters in early human societies had the maximum number of sexual partners. Unable to study early humans, researchers studied chimpanzees. Researchers observed chimpanzees in Taï National Park and concluded that a form of prostitution exists among the chimpanzees in which females offer sex to males in exchange for meat. According to Cristina Gomes of the Institute, the study "strongly suggests that wild chimpanzees exchange meat for sex and do so on a long-term basis". The data reveals that chimps enter into communities of hunting and sharing meat with each other over long periods of time, and that females within the meat-sharing community tend to copulate with males of their own meat-sharing community. Direct exchange of meat for sex has not been observed.

== Capuchin monkeys ==
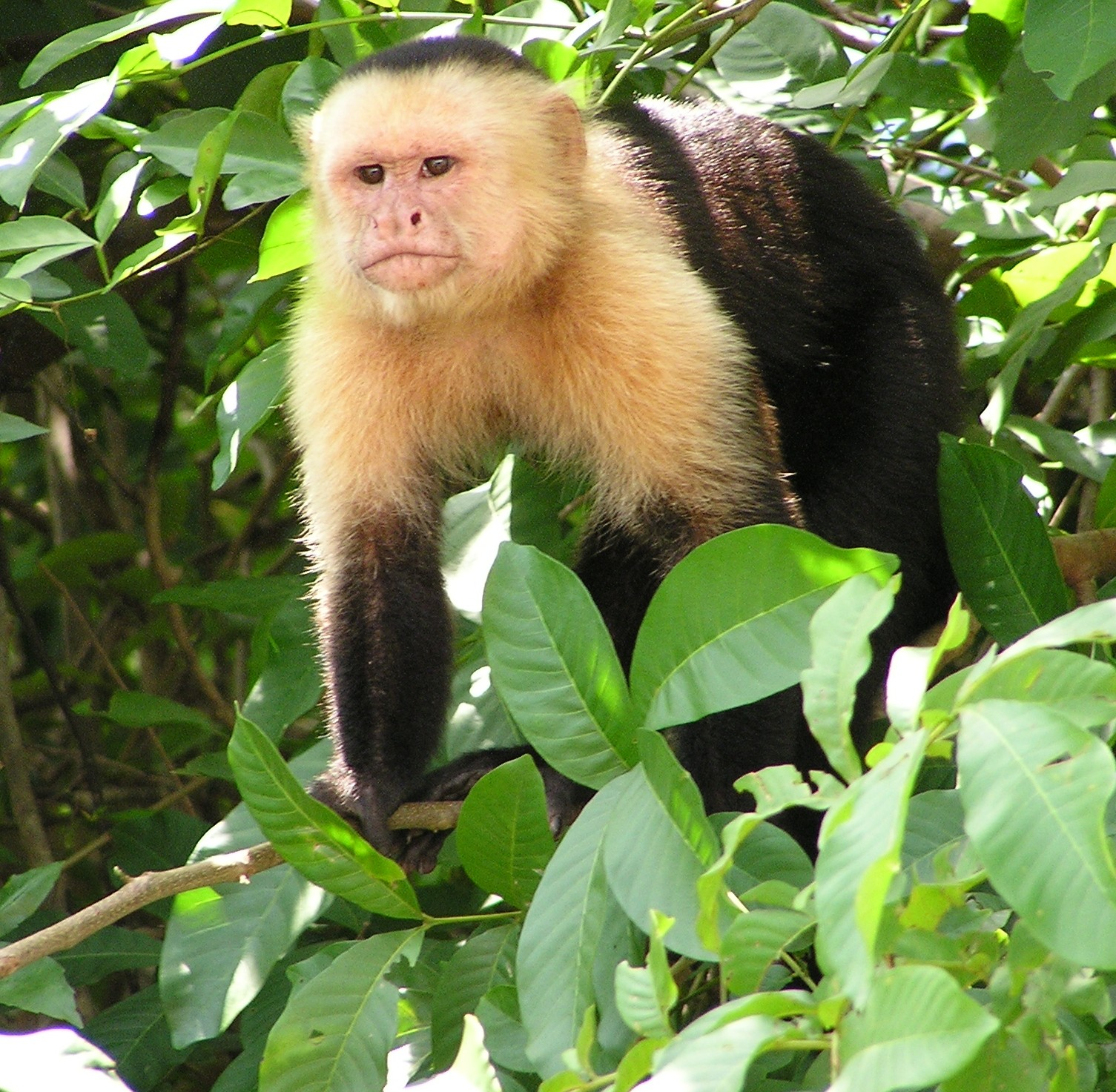
Capuchin monkey

A study at Yale–New Haven Hospital trained capuchin monkeys to use silver discs as money in order to study their economic behavior. The discs could be exchanged by the monkeys for various treats. During one isolated incident, a researcher observed what appeared to be a monkey exchanging a disc for sex. The monkey that was paid for sex immediately traded her silver disc for a grape.

== See also ==
- Animal sexual behaviour
- Bonobo sexual behaviour
