= Animal sexual behaviour =

Sexual behavior of non-human animals

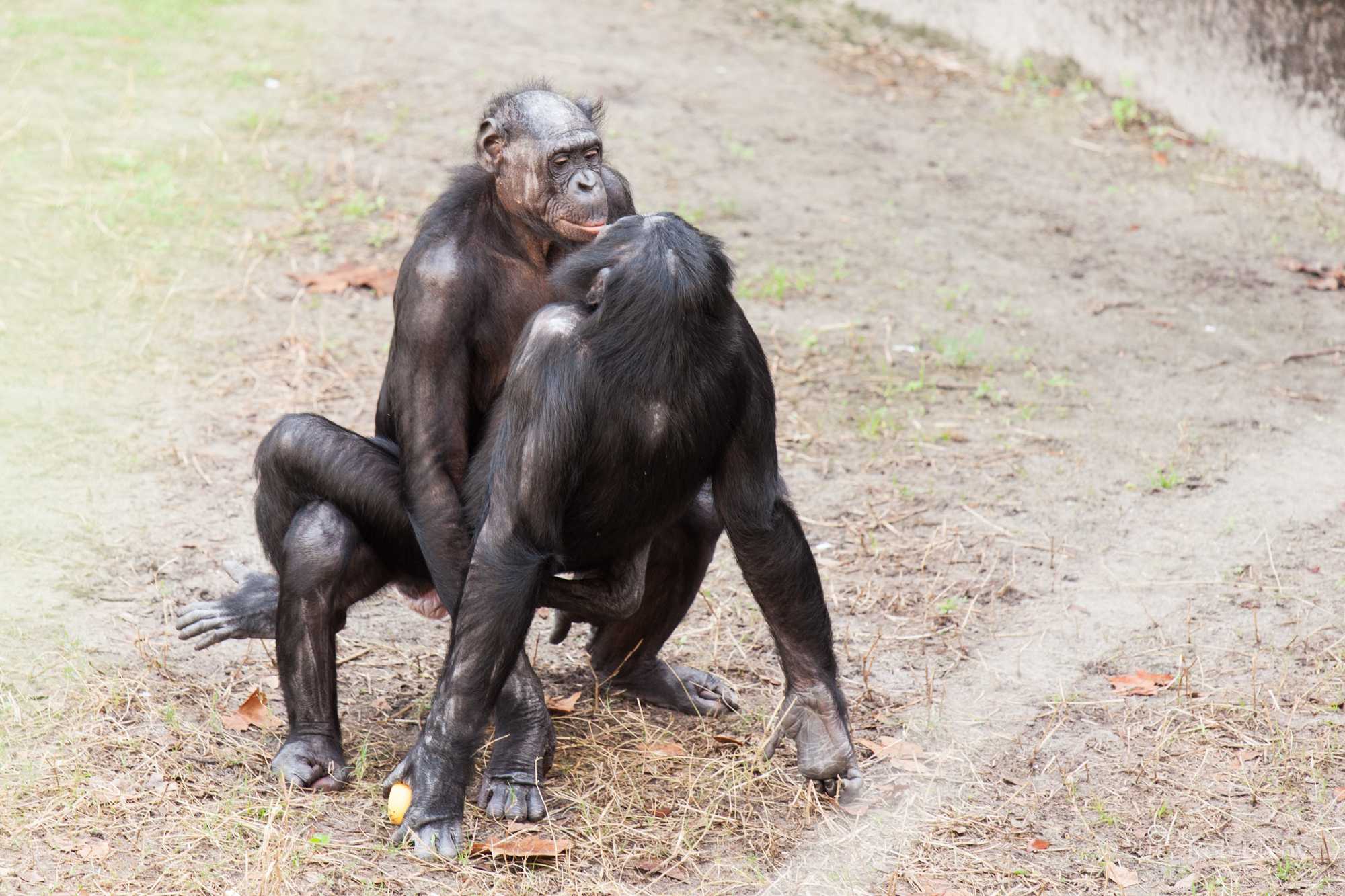
Bonobos mating in a zoo

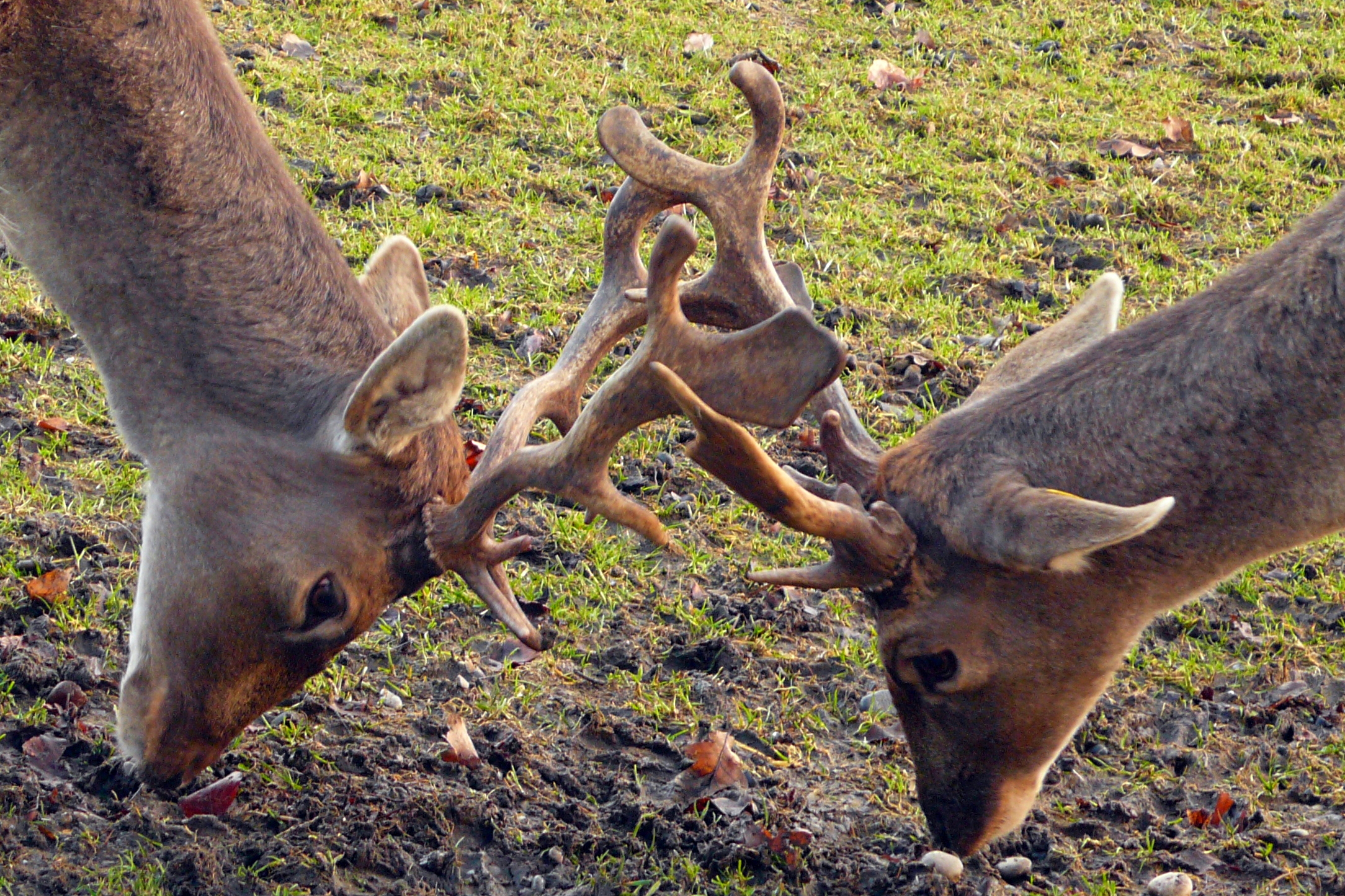
Stags fighting while competing for females—a common sexual behavior

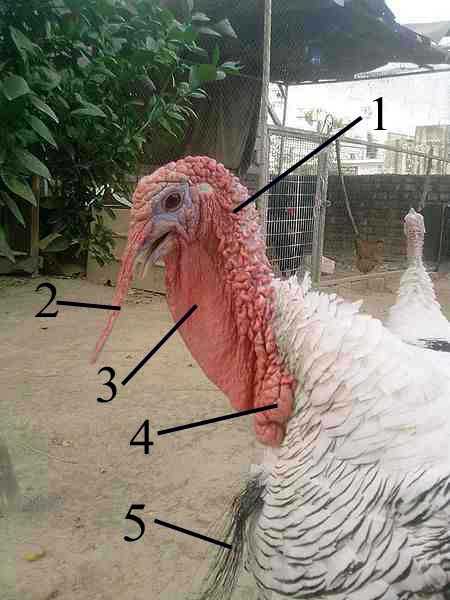
Anatomical structures on the head and throat of a domestic turkey. 1. Caruncles 2. Snood 3. Wattle (dewlap) 4. Major caruncle 5. Beard. During sexual behavior, these structures enlarge or become brightly colored.

Animal sexual behaviour takes many different forms, including within the same species. Common mating or reproductively motivated systems include monogamy, polygyny, polyandry, polygamy and promiscuity. Other sexual behaviour may be reproductively motivated (e.g. sex apparently due to duress or coercion and situational sexual behaviour) or non-reproductively motivated (e.g. homosexual sexual behaviour, bisexual sexual behaviour, cross-species sex, sexual arousal from objects or places, sex with dead animals, etc.).

When animal sexual behaviour is reproductively motivated, it is often termed mating or copulation; for most non-human mammals, mating and copulation occur at oestrus (the most fertile period in the mammalian female's reproductive cycle), which increases the chances of successful impregnation. Some animal sexual behaviour involves competition, sometimes fighting, between multiple males. Females often select males for mating only if they appear strong and able to protect themselves. The male that wins a fight may also have the chance to mate with a larger number of females and will therefore pass on his genes to their offspring.

Historically, it was believed that only humans and a small number of other species performed sexual acts other than for reproduction, and that animals' sexuality was instinctive and a simple "stimulus–response" behaviour. However, in addition to homosexual behaviours, a range of species masturbate and may use objects as tools to help them do so. Sexual behaviour may be tied more strongly to the establishment and maintenance of complex social bonds across a population which support its success in non-reproductive ways. Both reproductive and non-reproductive behaviours can be related to expressions of dominance over another animal or survival within a stressful situation (such as sex due to duress or coercion).

== Mating systems ==
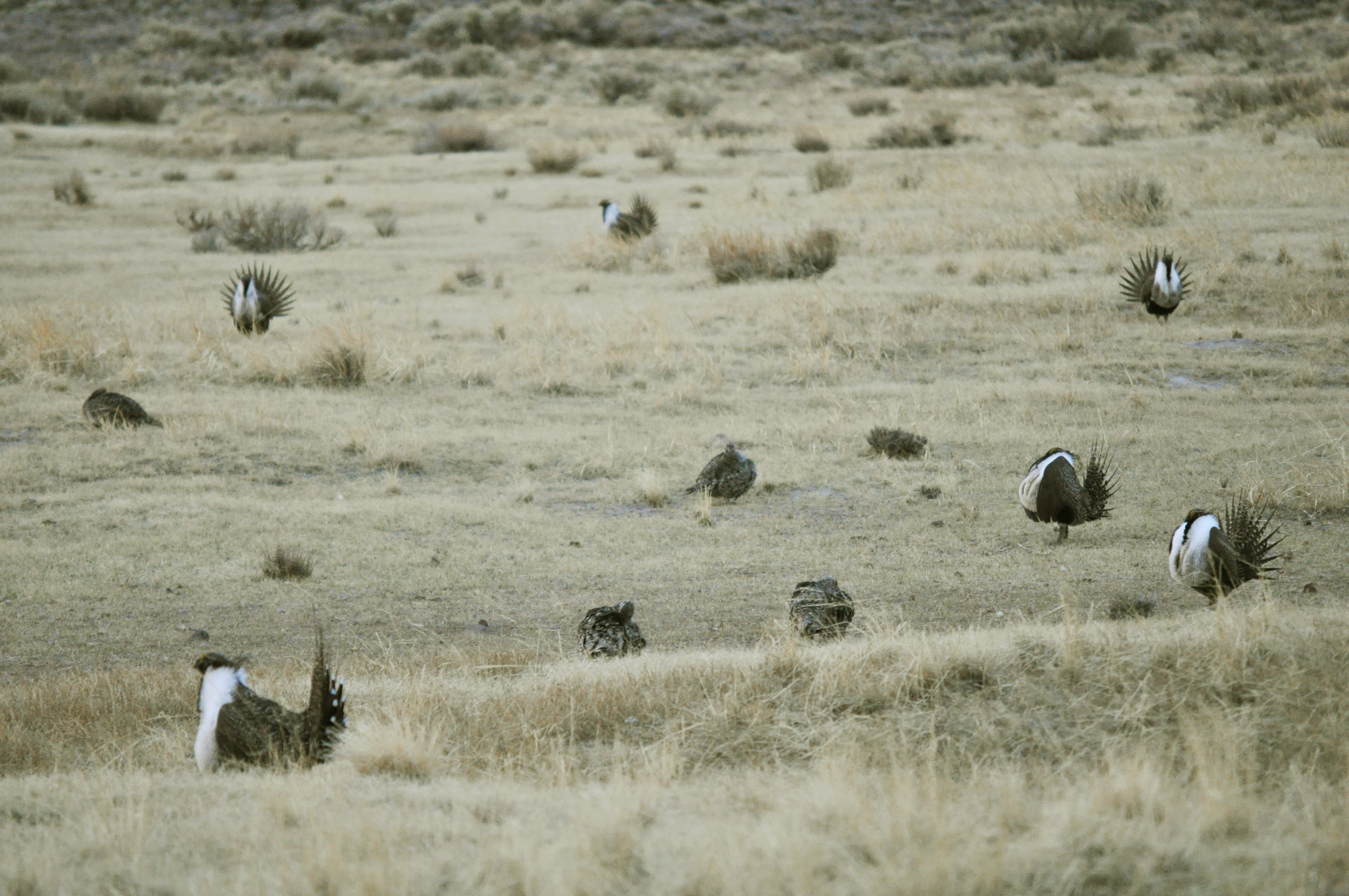
Greater sage-grouse at a lek, with multiple males displaying for the less conspicuous females

In sociobiology and behavioural ecology, the term "mating system" is used to describe the ways in which animal societies are structured in relation to sexual behaviour. The mating system specifies which males mate with which females, and under what circumstances. There are four basic systems:

The four basic mating systems
	Single female	Multiple females
Single male	Monogamy	Polygyny
Multiple males	Polyandry	Polygynandry

=== Monogamy ===
Monogamy occurs when one male and one female mate exclusively with each other. A monogamous mating system is one in which individuals form long-lasting pairs and cooperate in raising offspring. These pairs may last for a lifetime, such as in pigeons, or it may occasionally change from one mating season to another, such as in emperor penguins. In contrast with tournament species, these pair-bonding species have lower levels of male aggression, competition and little sexual dimorphism. Zoologists and biologists now have evidence that monogamous pairs of animals are not always sexually exclusive. Many animals that form pairs to mate and raise offspring regularly engage in sexual activities with extra-pair partners. This includes previous examples, such as swans. Sometimes, these extra-pair sexual activities lead to offspring. Genetic tests frequently show that some of the offspring raised by a monogamous pair come from the female mating with an extra-pair male partner. These discoveries have led biologists to adopt new ways of talking about monogamy. According to Ulrich Reichard (2003):

Social monogamy refers to a male and female's social living arrangement (e.g., shared use of a territory, behaviour indicative of a social pair, and/or proximity between a male and female) without inferring any sexual interactions or reproductive patterns. In humans, social monogamy takes the form of monogamous marriage. Sexual monogamy is defined as an exclusive sexual relationship between a female and a male based on observations of sexual interactions. Finally, the term genetic monogamy is used when DNA analyses can confirm that a female-male pair reproduce exclusively with each other. A combination of terms indicates examples where levels of relationships coincide, e.g., sociosexual and sociogenetic monogamy describe corresponding social and sexual, and social and genetic monogamous relationships, respectively.

Whatever makes a pair of animals socially monogamous does not necessarily make them sexually or genetically monogamous. Social monogamy, sexual monogamy, and genetic monogamy can occur in different combinations.

Social monogamy is relatively rare in the animal kingdom. The actual incidence of social monogamy varies greatly across different branches of the evolutionary tree. Over 90% of avian species are socially monogamous. This stands in contrast to mammals. Only 3% of mammalian species are socially monogamous, although up to 15% of primate species are. Social monogamy has also been observed in reptiles, fish, and insects.

Sexual monogamy is also rare among animals. Many socially monogamous species engage in extra-pair copulations, making them sexually non-monogamous. For example, while over 90% of birds are socially monogamous, "on average, 30% or more of the baby birds in any nest [are] sired by someone other than the resident male." Patricia Adair Gowaty has estimated that, out of 180 different species of socially monogamous songbirds, only 10% are sexually monogamous.

The incidence of genetic monogamy, determined by DNA fingerprinting, varies widely across species. For a few rare species, the incidence of genetic monogamy is 100%, with all offspring genetically related to the socially monogamous pair. But genetic monogamy is strikingly low in other species. Barash and Lipton note:

The highest known frequency of extra-pair copulations are found among the fairy-wrens, lovely tropical creatures technically known as Malurus splendens and Malurus cyaneus. More than 65% of all fairy-wren chicks are fathered by males outside the supposed breeding group.^{p. 12}

Such low levels of genetic monogamy have surprised biologists and zoologists, forcing them to rethink the role of social monogamy in evolution. They can no longer assume social monogamy determines how genes are distributed in a species. The lower the rates of genetic monogamy among socially monogamous pairs, the less of a role social monogamy plays in determining how genes are distributed among offspring.

=== Polygamy ===
The term polygamy is an umbrella term used to refer generally to non-monogamous matings. As such, polygamous relationships can be polygynous, polyandrous or polygynandrous. In a small number of species, individuals can display either polygamous or monogamous behaviour depending on environmental conditions. An example is the social wasp Apoica flavissima. In some species, polygyny and polyandry is displayed by both sexes in the population. Polygamy in both sexes has been observed in red flour beetle (Tribolium castaneum). Polygamy is also seen in many Lepidoptera species including Mythimna unipuncta (true armyworm moth).

A tournament species is one in which "mating tends to be highly polygamous and involves high levels of male-male aggression and competition." Tournament behaviour often correlates with high levels of sexual dimorphism, examples of species including chimpanzees and baboons. Most polygamous species present high levels of tournament behaviour, with a notable exception being bonobos.

==== Polygyny ====
Polygyny occurs when one male gets exclusive mating rights with multiple females. In some species, notably those with harem-like structures, only one of a few males in a group of females will mate. Technically, polygyny in sociobiology and zoology is defined as a system in which a male has a relationship with more than one female, but the females are predominantly bonded to a single male. Should the active male be driven out, killed, or otherwise removed from the group, in a number of species the new male will ensure that breeding resources are not wasted on another male's young. The new male may achieve this in many different ways, including:

- competitive infanticide: in lions, hippopotamuses, and some monkeys, the new male will kill the offspring of the previous alpha male to cause their mothers to become receptive to his sexual advances since they are no longer nursing. To prevent this, many female primates exhibit ovulation cues among all males, and show situation-dependent receptivity.
- harassment to miscarriage: amongst wild horses and baboons, the male will continually attack pregnant females until they miscarry.
- Pheromone-based spontaneous abortion
- in some rodents such as mice, a new male with a different scent will cause females who are pregnant to spontaneously fail to implant recently fertilised eggs. This does not require contact; it is mediated by scent alone. It is known as the Bruce effect.

Von Haartman specifically described the mating behaviour of the European pied flycatcher as successive polygyny. Within this system, the males leave their home territory once their primary female lays her first egg. Males then create a second territory, presumably in order to attract a secondary female to breed. Even when they succeed at acquiring a second mate, the males typically return to the first female to exclusively provide for her and her offspring.

Polygynous mating structures are estimated to occur in up to 90% of mammal species. As polygyny is the most common form of polygamy among vertebrates (including humans), it has been studied far more extensively than polyandry or polygynandry.

==== Polyandry ====
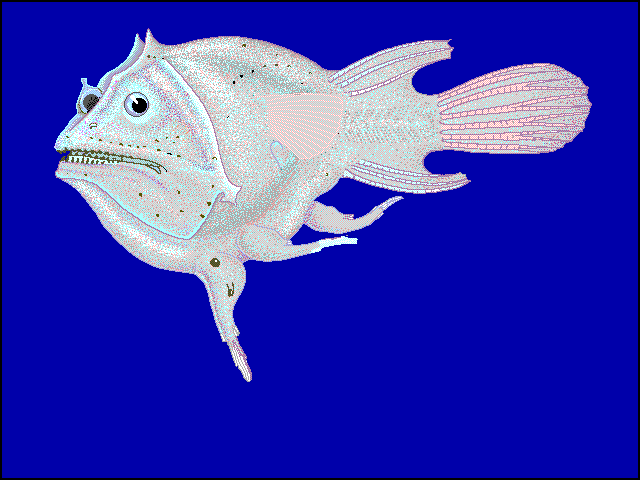
The anglerfish Haplophryne mollis is polyandrous. This female is trailing the atrophied remains of males she has encountered.

Polyandry occurs when one female gets exclusive mating rights with multiple males. In some species, such as redlip blennies, both polygyny and polyandry are observed.

The males in some deep sea anglerfishes are much smaller than the females. When they find a female they bite into her skin, releasing an enzyme that digests the skin of their mouths and her body and fusing the pair down to the blood-vessel level. The male then slowly atrophies, losing first his digestive organs, then his brain, heart, and eyes, ending as nothing more than a pair of gonads, which release sperm in response to hormones in the female's bloodstream indicating egg release. This extreme sexual dimorphism ensures that, when the female is ready to spawn, she has a mate immediately available. A single anglerfish female can "mate" with many males in this manner.

==== Polygynandry ====
Polygynandry occurs when multiple males mate indiscriminately with multiple females. The numbers of males and females need not be equal, and in vertebrate species studied so far, there are usually fewer males. Two examples of systems in primates are promiscuous mating chimpanzees and bonobos. These species live in social groups consisting of several males and several females. Each female copulates with many males, and vice versa. In bonobos, the amount of promiscuity is particularly striking because bonobos use sex to alleviate social conflict as well as to reproduce. This mutual promiscuity is the approach most commonly used by spawning animals, and is perhaps the "original fish mating system". Common examples are forage fish, such as herrings, which form huge mating shoals in shallow water. The water becomes milky with sperm and the bottom is draped with millions of fertilised eggs.

== Parental investment and reproductive success ==
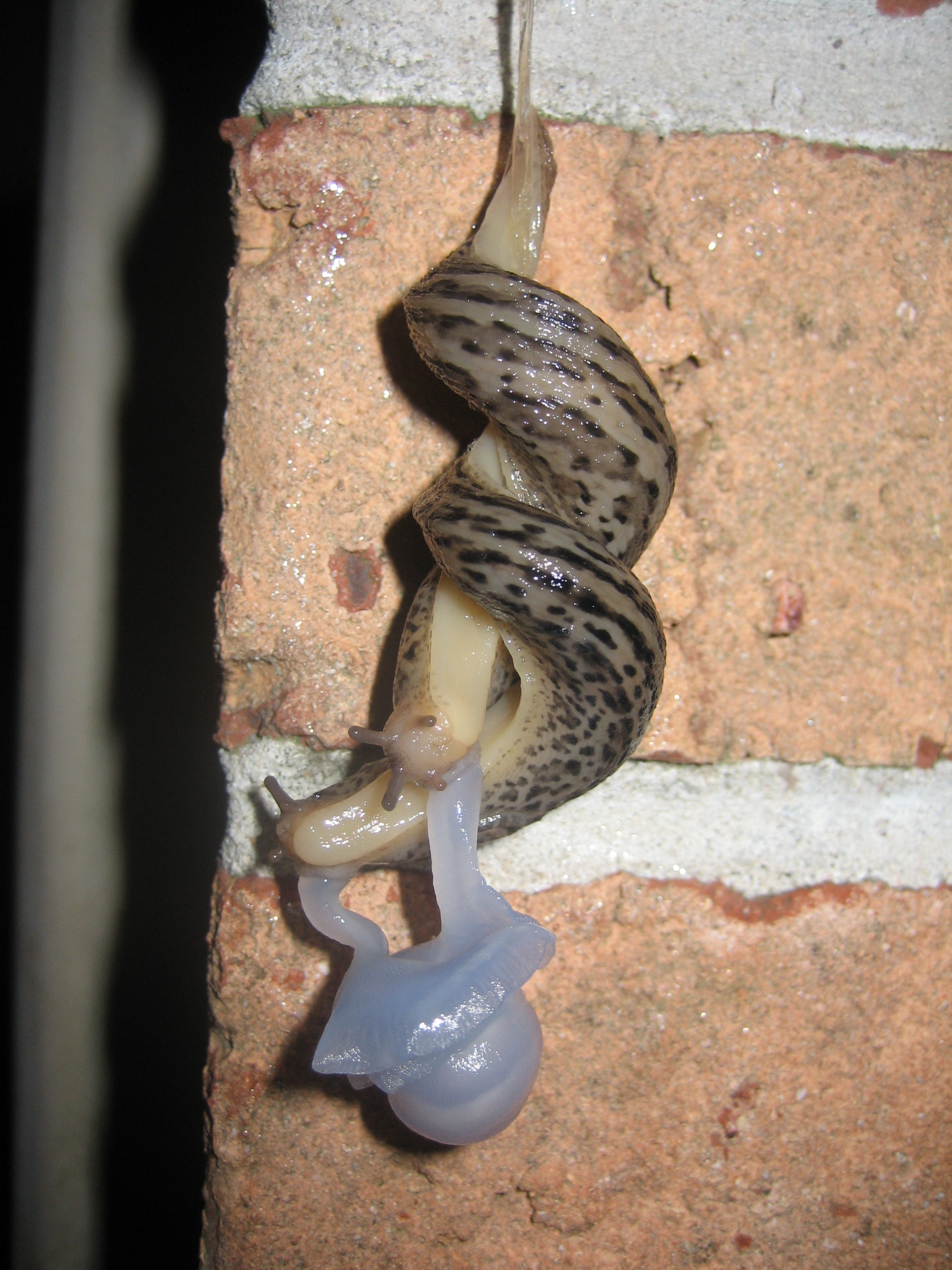
Mating grey slugs, suspended from a slime thread

Female and male sexual behaviour differ in many species. Often, males are more active in initiating mating, and bear the more conspicuous sexual ornamentation like antlers and colourful plumage. This is a result of anisogamy, where sperm are smaller and much less costly (energetically) to produce than eggs. This difference in physiological cost means that males are more limited by the number of mates they can secure, while females are limited by the quality of genes of her mates, a phenomenon known as Bateman's principle. Many females also have extra reproductive burdens in that parental care often falls mainly, or exclusively, on them. Thus, females are more limited in their potential reproductive success. In species where males take on more of the reproductive costs, such as sea horses and jacanas, the role is reversed, and the females are larger, more aggressive and more brightly coloured than the males.

In hermaphroditic animals, the costs of parental care can be evenly distributed between the sexes, e.g. earthworms. In some species of planarians, sexual behaviour takes the form of penis fencing. In this form of copulation, the individual that first penetrates the other with the penis, forces the other to be female, thus carrying the majority of the cost of reproduction. Post mating, banana slugs will some times gnaw off their partners penis as an act of sperm competition called apophallation. This is costly as they must heal, and spend more energy courting conspecifics that can act as male and female. A hypothesis suggests these slugs may be able to compensate the loss of the male function by directing energy that would have been put towards it to the female function. In the grey slug, the sharing of cost leads to a spectacular display, where the mates suspend themselves high above the ground from a slime thread, ensuring none of them can refrain from taking on the cost of egg-bearer.

== Seasonality ==
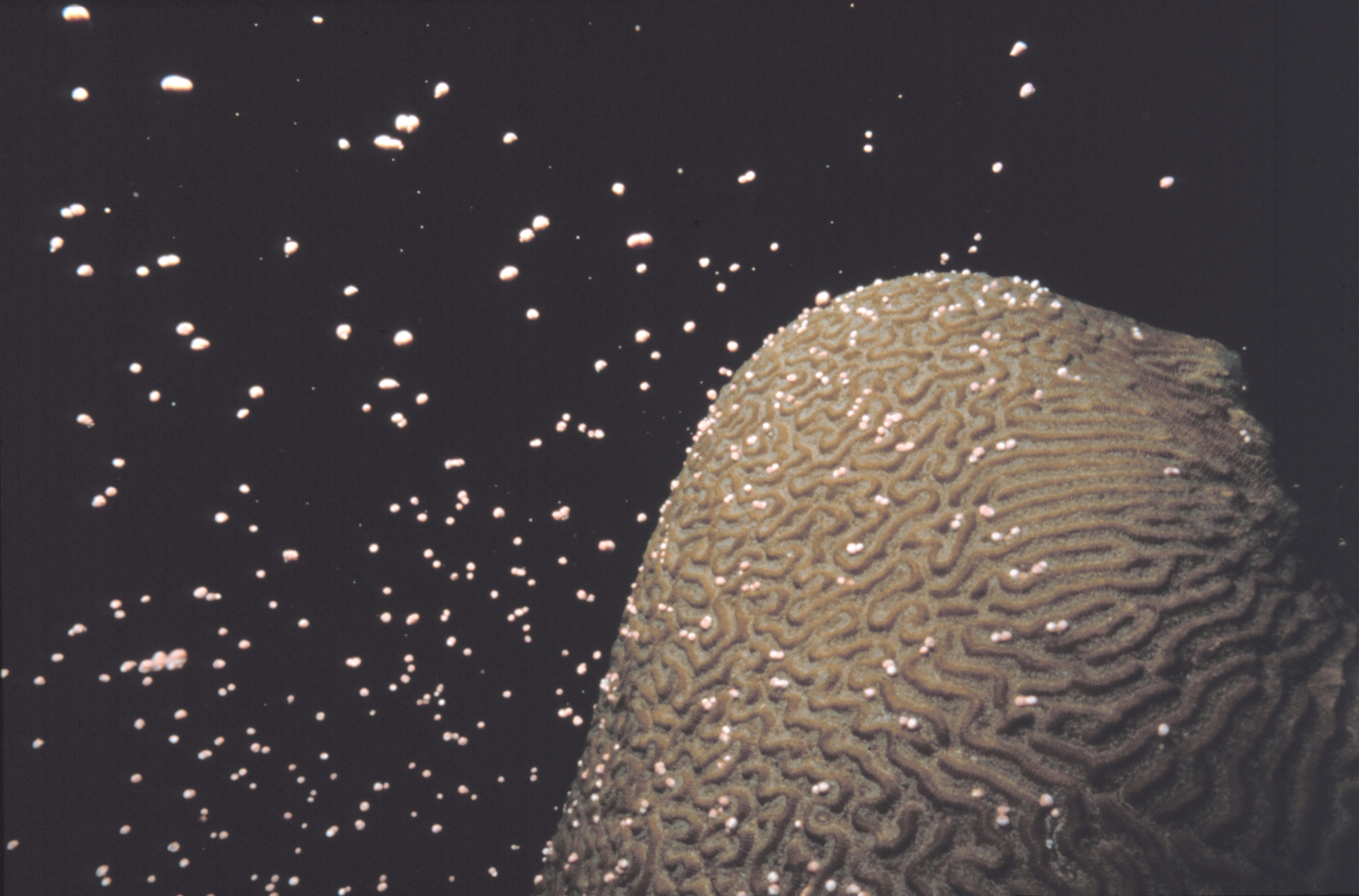
Brain corals typically spawning in connection with the full moon every August

Many animal species have specific mating (or breeding) periods e.g. (seasonal breeding) so that offspring are born or hatch at an optimal time. In marine species with limited mobility and external fertilisation like corals, sea urchins and clams, the timing of the common spawning is the only externally visible form of sexual behaviour. In areas with continuously high primary production, some species have a series of breeding seasons throughout the year. This is the case with most primates (who are primarily tropical and subtropical animals). Some animals (opportunistic breeders) breed dependent upon other conditions in their environment aside from time of year.

=== Mammals ===
Mating seasons are often associated with changes to herd or group structure, and behavioural changes, including territorialism amongst individuals. These may be annual (e.g. wolves), biannual (e.g. dogs) or more frequently (e.g. horses). During these periods, females of most mammalian species are more mentally and physically receptive to sexual advances, a period scientifically described as oestrus but commonly described as being "in season" or "in heat". Sexual behaviour may occur outside oestrus, and such acts as do occur are not necessarily harmful.

Some mammals (e.g. domestic cats, rabbits and camelids) are termed "induced ovulators". For these species, the female ovulates due to an external stimulus during, or just prior to, mating, rather than ovulating cyclically or spontaneously. Stimuli causing induced ovulation include the sexual behaviour of coitus, sperm and pheromones. Domestic cats have penile spines. Upon withdrawal of a cat's penis, the spines rake the walls of the female's vagina, which may cause ovulation.

=== Amphibians ===
For many amphibians, an annual breeding cycle applies, typically regulated by ambient temperature, precipitation, availability of surface water and food supply. This breeding season is accentuated in temperate regions, in boreal climate the breeding season is typically concentrated to a few short days in the spring. Some species, such as the Rana clamitans (green frog), spend from June to August defending their territory. In order to protect these territories, they use five vocalizations.

=== Fish ===
Like many coral reef dwellers, the clownfish spawn around the time of the full moon in the wild. In a group of clownfish, there is a strict dominance hierarchy. The largest and most aggressive female is found at the top. Only two clownfish, a male and a female, in a group reproduce through external fertilisation. Clownfish are sequential hermaphrodites, meaning that they develop into males first, and when they mature, they become females. If the female clownfish is removed from the group, such as by death, one of the largest and most dominant males will become a female. The remaining males will move up a rank in the hierarchy.

== Motivation ==
Various neurohormones stimulate sexual wanting in animals. In general, studies have suggested that dopamine is involved in sexual incentive motivation, oxytocin and melanocortins in sexual attraction, and noradrenaline in sexual arousal. Vasopressin is also involved in the sexual behaviour of some animals.

=== Neurohormones in the mating systems of voles ===
The mating system of prairie voles is monogamous; after mating, they form a lifelong bond. In contrast, montane voles have a polygamous mating system. When montane voles mate, they form no strong attachments, and separate after copulation. Studies on the brains of these two species have found that it is two neurohormones and their respective receptors that are responsible for these differences in mating strategies. Male prairie voles release vasopressin after copulation with a partner, and an attachment to their partner then develops. Female prairie voles release oxytocin after copulation with a partner, and similarly develop an attachment to their partner.

Neither male nor female montane voles release high quantities of oxytocin or vasopressin when they mate. Even when injected with these neurohormones, their mating system does not change. In contrast, if prairie voles are injected with the neurohormones, they may form a lifelong attachment, even if they have not mated. The differing response to the neurohormones between the two species is due to a difference in the number of oxytocin and vasopressin receptors. Prairie voles have a greater number of oxytocin and vasopressin receptors compared to montane voles, and are therefore more sensitive to those two neurohormones. It's believed that it's the quantity of receptors, rather than the quantity of the hormones, that determines the mating system and bond-formation of either species.

=== Oxytocin and rat sexual behaviour ===
Mother rats experience a postpartum estrus which makes them highly motivated to mate. However, they also have a strong motivation to protect their newly born pups. As a consequence, the mother rat solicits males to the nest but simultaneously becomes aggressive towards them to protect her young. If the mother rat is given injections of an oxytocin receptor antagonist, they no longer experience these maternal motivations.

Prolactin influences social bonding in rats.

=== Oxytocin and primate sexual behaviour ===
Oxytocin plays a similar role in non-human primates as it does in humans.

Grooming, sex, and cuddling frequencies correlate positively with levels of oxytocin. As the level of oxytocin increases so does sexual motivation. While oxytocin plays a major role in parent child relationships, it is also found to play a role in adult sexual relationships. Its secretion affects the nature of the relationship or if there will even be a relationship at all.

Studies have shown that oxytocin is higher in monkeys in lifelong monogamous relationships compared to monkeys which are single. Furthermore, the oxytocin levels of the couples correlate positively; when the oxytocin secretion of one increases, the other one also increases. Higher levels of oxytocin are related to monkeys expressing more behaviours such as cuddling, grooming and sex, while lower levels of oxytocin reduce motivation for these activities.

Research on oxytocin's role in the animal brain suggests that it plays less of a role in behaviours of love and affection than previously believed. "When oxytocin was first discovered in 1909, it was thought mostly to influence a mother's labour contractions and milk let-down. Then, in the 1990s, research with prairie voles found that giving them a dose of oxytocin resulted in the formation of a bond with their future mate (Azar, 40)." Oxytocin has since been treated by the media as the sole player in the "love and mating game" in mammals. This view, however, is proving to be false as, "most hormones don't influence behaviour directly. Rather, they affect thinking and emotions in variable ways (Azar, 40)." There is much more involved in sexual behaviour in the mammalian animal than oxytocin and vasopressin can explain.

=== Pleasure ===
It is often assumed that animals do not have sex for pleasure, or alternatively that humans, pigs, bonobos (and perhaps dolphins and one or two more species of primates) are the only species that do. This is sometimes stated as "animals mate only for reproduction". This view is considered a misconception by some scholars. Jonathan Balcombe argues that the prevalence of non-reproductive sexual behaviour in certain species suggests that sexual stimulation is pleasurable. He also points to the presence of the clitoris in some female mammals, and evidence for female orgasm in primates. On the other hand, it is impossible to know the subjective feelings of animals, and the notion that non-human animals experience emotions similar to humans is a contentious subject.

A 2006 Danish Animal Ethics Council report, which examined current knowledge of animal sexuality in the context of legal queries concerning sexual acts by humans, has the following comments, primarily related to domestically common animals:

Even though the evolution-related purpose of mating can be said to be reproduction, it is not actually the creating of offspring which originally causes them to mate. It is probable that they mate because they are motivated for the actual copulation, and because this is connected with a positive experience. It is therefore reasonable to assume that there is some form of pleasure or satisfaction connected with the act. This assumption is confirmed by the behaviour of males, who in the case of many species are prepared to work to get access to female animals, especially if the female animal is in oestrus, and males who for breeding purposes are used to having sperm collected become very eager, when the equipment they associate with the collection is taken out. . . . There is nothing in female mammals' anatomy or physiology that contradicts that stimulation of the sexual organs and mating is able to be a positive experience. For instance, the clitoris acts in the same way as with women, and scientific studies have shown that the success of reproduction is improved by stimulation of clitoris on (among other species) cows and mares in connection with insemination, because it improves the transportation of the sperm due to contractions of the inner genitalia. This probably also applies to female animals of other animal species, and contractions in the inner genitals are seen e.g. also during orgasm for women. It is therefore reasonable to assume that sexual intercourse may be linked with a positive experience for female animals.

== Koinophilia ==
Koinophilia is the love of the "normal" or phenotypically common (from the Greek κοινός, koinós, meaning "usual" or "common"). The term was introduced to scientific literature in 1990, and refers to the tendency of animals seeking a mate to prefer that mate not to have any unusual, peculiar or deviant features. Similarly, animals preferentially choose mates with low fluctuating asymmetry. However, animal sexual ornaments can evolve through runaway selection, which is driven by (usually female) selection for non-standard traits.

== Interpretation bias ==
The field of study of sexuality in non-human species was a long-standing taboo. In the past, researchers sometimes failed to observe, miscategorised or misdescribed sexual behaviour which did not meet their preconceptions—their bias tended to support what would now be described as conservative sexual mores. An example of overlooking behaviour relates to descriptions of giraffe mating:

When nine out of ten pairings occur between males, "[e]very male that sniffed a female was reported as sex, while anal intercourse with orgasm between males was only [categorized as] 'revolving around' dominance, competition or greetings."

In the 21st century, liberal social or sexual views are often projected upon animal subjects of research. Popular discussions of bonobos are a frequently cited example. Current research frequently expresses views such as that of the Natural History Museum at the University of Oslo, which in 2006 held an exhibition on animal sexuality:

Many researchers have described homosexuality as something altogether different from sex. They must realise that animals can have sex with who they will, when they will and without consideration to a researcher's ethical principles.

Other animal activities may be misinterpreted due to the frequency and context in which animals perform the behaviour. For example, domestic ruminants display behaviours such as mounting and head-butting. This often occurs when the animals are establishing dominance relationships and are not necessarily sexually motivated. Careful analysis must be made to interpret what animal motivations are being expressed by those behaviours.

== Types of sexual behaviour ==
=== Reproductive sexual behaviour ===
==== Copulation ====
Copulation is the union of the male and female sex organs, the sexual activity specifically organized to transmit male sperm into the body of the female.

==== Cuckoldry ====
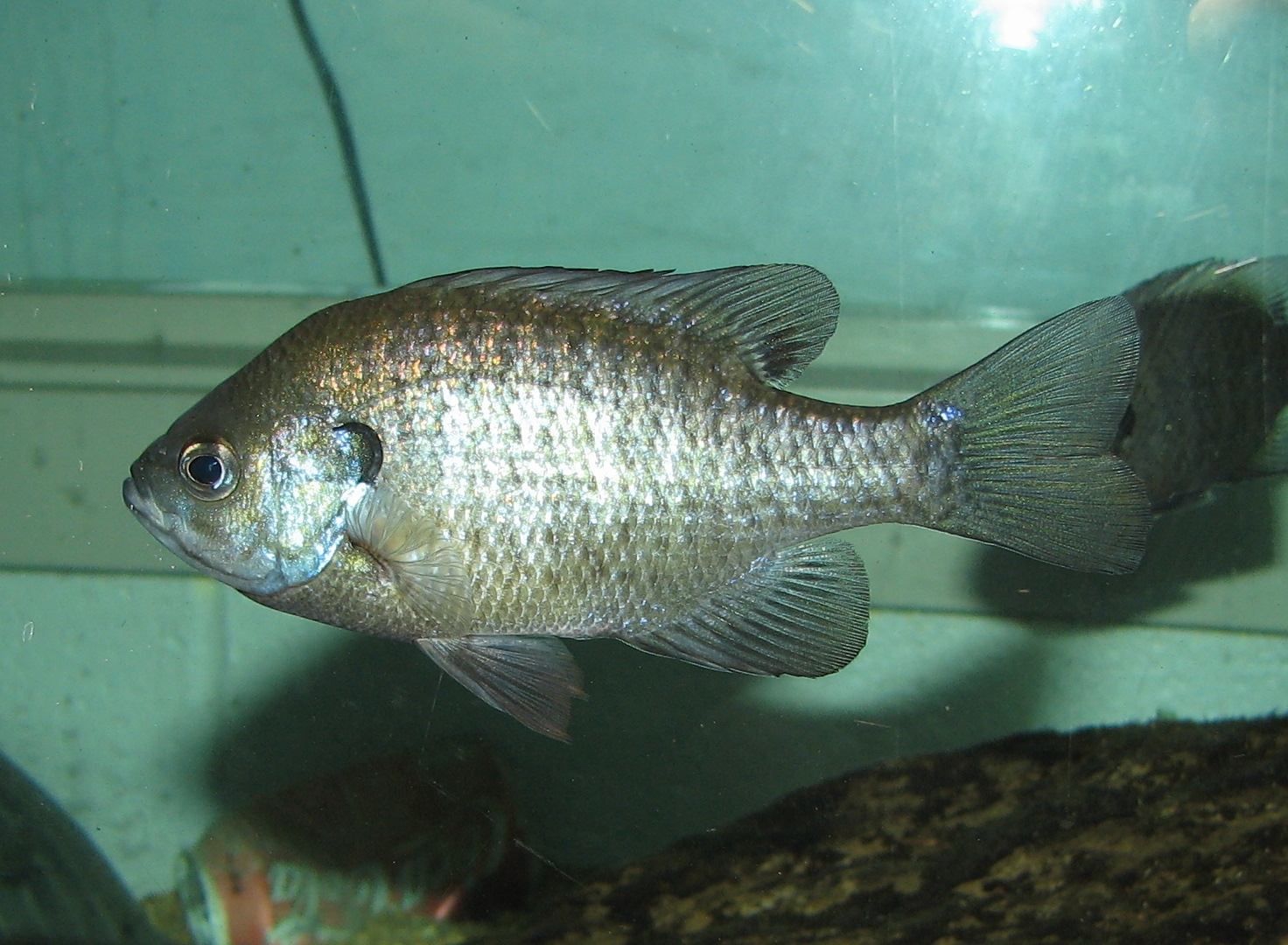
Small male bluegill sunfishes cuckold large males by adopting sneaker strategies.

Alternative male strategies which allow small males to engage in cuckoldry can develop in species such as fish where spawning is dominated by large and aggressive males. Cuckoldry is a variant of polyandry, and can occur with sneak spawners. A sneak spawner is a male that rushes in to join the spawning rush of a spawning pair. A spawning rush occurs when a fish makes a burst of speed, usually on a near vertical incline, releasing gametes at the apex, followed by a rapid return to the lake or sea floor or fish aggregation. Sneaking males do not take part in courtship. In salmon and trout, for example, jack males are common. These are small silvery males that migrate upstream along with the standard, large, hook-nosed males and that spawn by sneaking into redds to release sperm simultaneously with a mated pair. This behaviour is an evolutionarily stable strategy for reproduction, because it is favoured by natural selection just like the "standard" strategy of large males.

==== Hermaphroditism ====
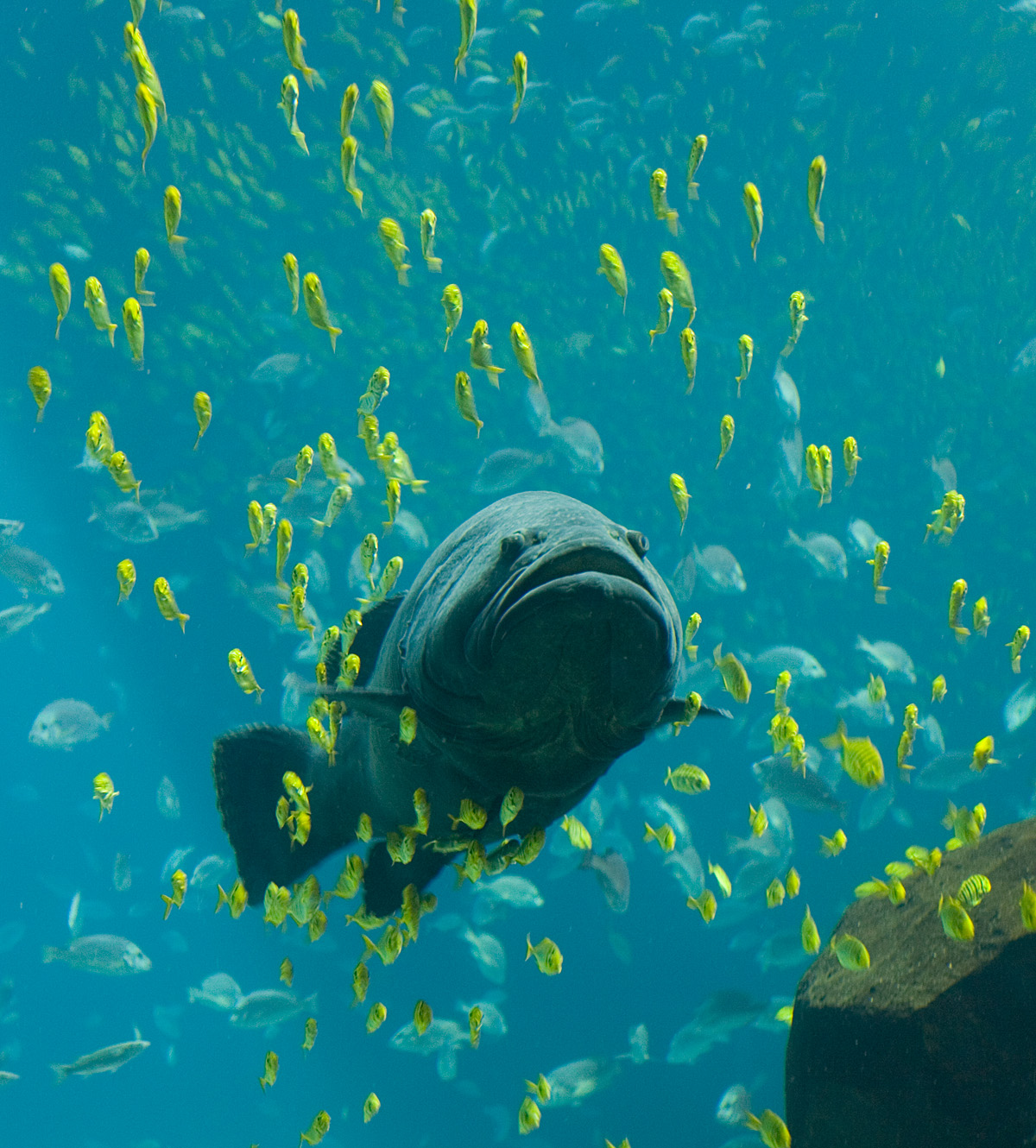
Female groupers change their sex to male if no male is available.

Hermaphroditism occurs when a given individual in a species possesses both male and female reproductive organs, or can alternate between possessing first one, and then the other. Hermaphroditism is common in invertebrates but rare in vertebrates. It can be contrasted with gonochorism, where each individual in a species is either male or female, and remains that way throughout their lives. Most fish are gonochorists, but hermaphroditism is known to occur in 14 families of teleost fishes.

Usually hermaphrodites are sequential, meaning they can switch sex, usually from female to male (protogyny). This can happen if a dominant male is removed from a group of females. The largest female in the harem can switch sex over a few days and replace the dominant male. This is found amongst coral reef fishes such as groupers, parrotfishes and wrasses. As an example, most wrasses are protogynous hermaphrodites within a haremic mating system. It is less common for a male to switch to a female (protandry). A common example of a protandrous species are clownfish—if the larger, dominant female dies, in many cases, the reproductive male gains weight and becomes the female. Hermaphroditism allows for complex mating systems. Wrasses exhibit three different mating systems: polygynous, lek-like, and promiscuous mating systems.

==== Sexual cannibalism ====
Araneus diadematus – cannibalistic mating behaviour

Sexual cannibalism is a behaviour in which a female animal kills and consumes the male before, during, or after copulation. Sexual cannibalism confers fitness advantages to both the male and female. Sexual cannibalism is common among insects, arachnids and amphipods. There is also evidence of sexual cannibalism in gastropods and copepods.

==== Sexual coercion ====
During mating, the male Leopard typically immobilizes the female

Sexual coercion behaviour during mating has been documented in a variety of species. In some herbivorous herd species, or species where males and females are very different in size, the male dominates sexually by force and size.

Some species of birds have been observed combining sexual intercourse with violence; these include ducks, and geese. Female white-fronted bee-eaters are subjected to copulation. When females emerge from their nest burrows, males sometimes force them to the ground and mate with them. Such sexual coercion are made preferentially on females who are laying and who may therefore lay eggs fertilized by the male.

It has been reported that young male elephants in South Africa sexually coerced and killed rhinoceroses. This interpretation of the elephants' behaviour was disputed by one of the original study's authors, who said there was "nothing sexual about these attacks".

In elephant seals' sexual intercourse, male elephant seals have been known to have relations with penguins, attempting to copulate with them "several times with periods of rest in between". The birds remained pinned down for the duration. For female elephant seals, physical injury happens very often. Mating leads to 1 in every 1,000 female elephant seals getting killed.

==== Parthenogenesis ====
Parthenogenesis is a form of asexual reproduction in which growth and development of embryos occur without fertilisation. Technically, parthenogenesis is not a behaviour, however, sexual behaviours may be involved.

Whip-tailed lizard females have the ability to reproduce through parthenogenesis and as such males are rare and sexual breeding non-standard. Females engage in "pseudocopulation" to stimulate ovulation, with their behaviour following their hormonal cycles; during low levels of oestrogen, these (female) lizards engage in "masculine" sexual roles. Those animals with currently high oestrogen levels assume "feminine" sexual roles. Lizards that perform the courtship ritual have greater fecundity than those kept in isolation due to an increase in hormones triggered by the sexual behaviours. So, even though asexual whiptail lizards populations lack males, sexual stimuli still increase reproductive success. From an evolutionary standpoint these females are passing their full genetic code to all of their offspring rather than the 50% of genes that would be passed in sexual reproduction.

It is rare to find true parthenogenesis in fishes, where females produce female offspring with no input from males. All-female species include the Texas silverside, Menidia clarkhubbsi and a complex of Mexican mollies.

Parthenogenesis has been recorded in 70 vertebrate species including hammerhead sharks, blacktip sharks, amphibians and lizards.

==== Unisexuality ====
Unisexuality occurs when a species is all-male or all-female. Unisexuality occurs in some fish species and can take complex forms. Squalius alburnoides, a minnow found in several river basins in Portugal and Spain, appears to be an all-male species. The existence of this species illustrates the potential complexity of mating systems in fish. The species originated as a hybrid between two species and is diploid but not hermaphroditic. It can have triploid and tetraploid forms, including all-female forms that reproduce mainly through hybridogenesis.

==== Others ====
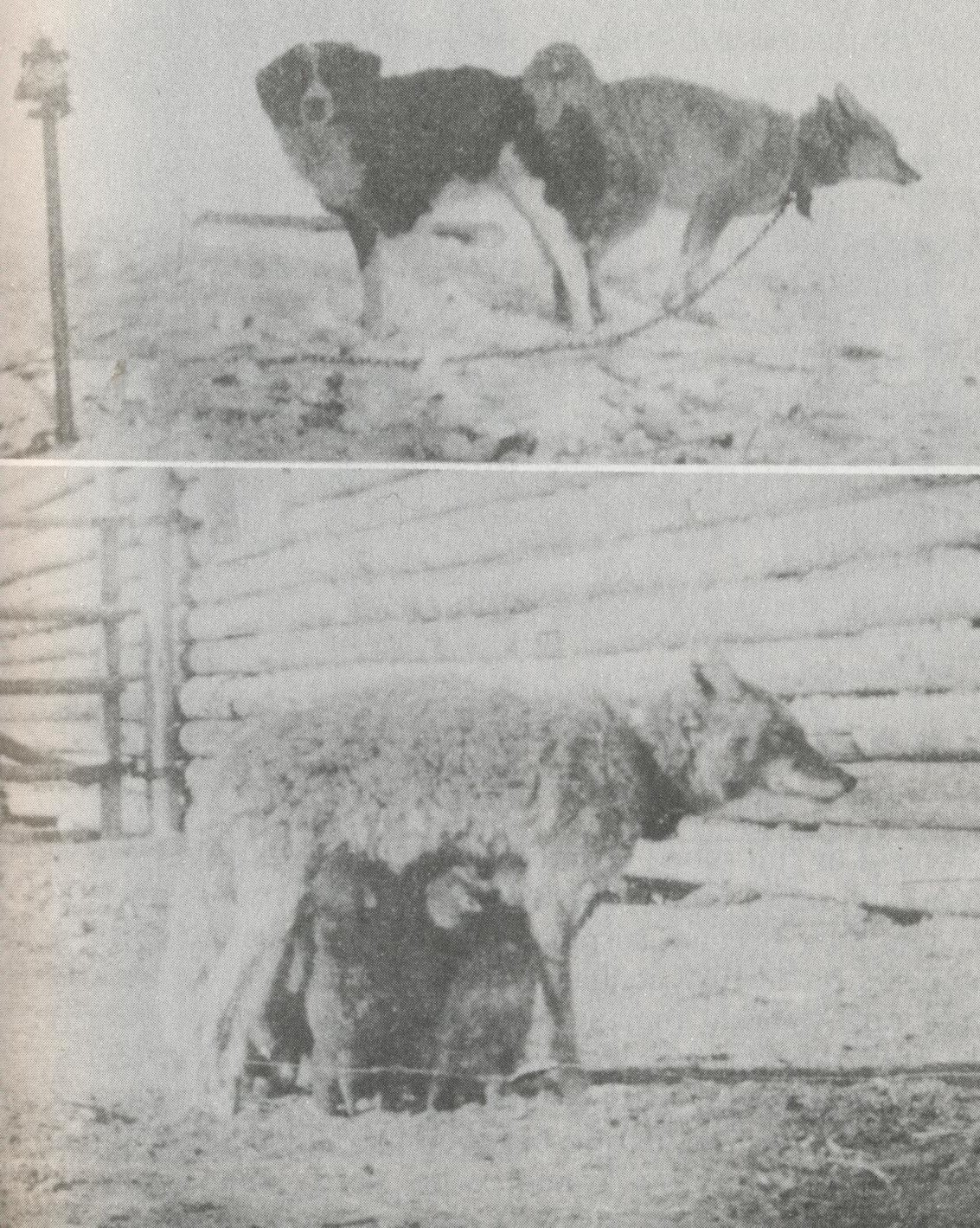
A dog mates with a coyote to produce a dog-coyote hybrid.

- Interbreeding: Hybrid offspring can result from the mating of two organisms of distinct but closely related parent species, although the resulting offspring is not always fertile. According to Alfred Kinsey, genetic studies on wild animal populations have shown a "large number" of inter-species hybrids.
- Prostitution: There are reports that animals occasionally engage in prostitution. A small number of pair-bonded females within a group of penguins took nesting material (stones) after copulating with a non-partner male. The researcher stated "I was watching opportunistically, so I can't give an exact figure of how common it really is." It has been reported that "bartering of meat for sex ... forms part of the social fabric of a troop of wild chimps living in the Tai National Park in the Côte d'Ivoire."
- Pavlovian conditioning: The sexualisation of objects or locations is recognised in the animal breeding world. For example, male animals may become sexually aroused upon visiting a location where they have been allowed to have sex before, or upon seeing a stimulus previously associated with sexual activity such as an artificial vagina. Sexual preferences for certain cues can be artificially induced in rats by pairing scents or objects with their early sexual experiences. The primary motivation of this behaviour is Pavlovian conditioning, and the association is due to a conditioned response (or association) formed with a distinctive "reward".
- Viewing images: A study using four adult male rhesus macaques (Macaca mulatta) showed that male rhesus macaques will give up a highly valued item, juice, to see images of the faces or perineum of high-status females. Encouraging captive pandas to mate is problematic. Showing young male pandas "panda pornography" is credited with a recent population boom among pandas in captivity in China. One researcher attributed the success to the sounds on the recordings.
- Copulatory wounding and traumatic insemination: Injury to a partner's genital tract during mating occurs in at least 40 taxa, ranging from fruit flies to humans. However, it often goes unnoticed due to its cryptic nature and because of internal wounds not visible outside.

=== Non-reproductive sexual behaviour ===
There is a range of behaviours that animals perform that appear to be sexually motivated but which can not result in reproduction. These include:

- Masturbation: Some species, both male and female, masturbate, both when partners are available and otherwise.
- Oral sex: Several species engage in both autofellatio and oral sex. This has been documented in brown bears, Tibetan macaques, wolves, goats, primates, bats, cape ground squirrels and sheep. In the greater short-nosed fruit bat, copulation by males is dorsoventral and the females lick the shaft or the base of the male's penis, but not the glans which has already penetrated the vagina. While the females do this, the penis is not withdrawn and research has shown a positive relationship between length of the time that the penis is licked and the duration of copulation. Post copulation genital grooming has also been observed.
- Homosexuality: Same-sex sexual behaviour occurs in a range of species, especially in social species, particularly in marine birds and mammals, monkeys, and the great apes. As of 1999, the scientific literature contained reports of homosexual behaviour in at least 471 wild species. Organisers of the Against Nature? exhibit stated that "homosexuality has been observed among 1,500 species, and that in 500 of those it is well documented." Besides humans, sheep are the only known mammal to exhibit exclusive homosexual behavior.

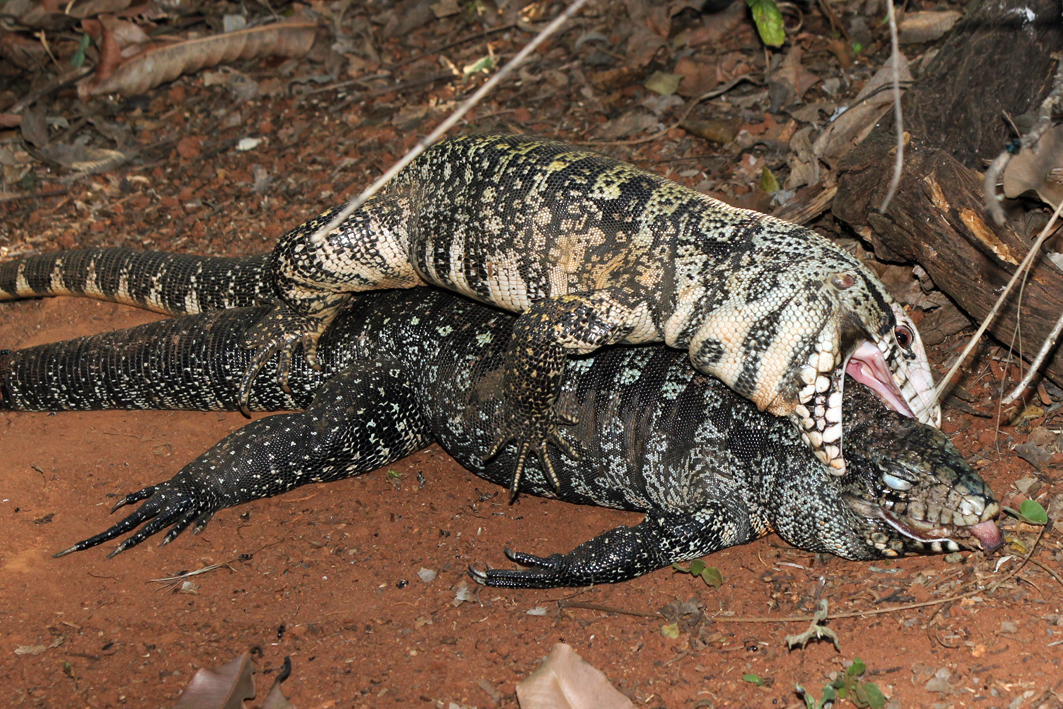
A male black and white tegu mounts a female that has been dead for two days and attempts to mate.

- Genital-genital rubbing: This is sexual activity in which one animal rubs his or her genitals against the genitals of another animal. This is stated to be the "bonobo's most typical sexual pattern, undocumented in any other primate".
- Inter-species mating: Some animals opportunistically mate with individuals of another species.
- Sex involving juveniles: Male stoats (Mustela erminea) will sometimes mate with infant females of their species. This is a natural part of their reproductive biology—they have a delayed gestation period, so these females give birth the following year when they are fully grown. Juvenile male common chimpanzees have been recorded mounting and copulating with immature chimps. Infants in bonobo societies are often involved in sexual behaviour.
- Necrophilia: This describes when an animal engages in a sexual act with a dead animal. It has been observed in mammals, birds, reptiles and frogs.
- Bisexuality: This describes when an animal shows sexual behaviour towards both males and females.
- Extended female sexuality: This is when females mate with males outside of their conceptive period.

==== Seahorse ====
Seahorses, once considered to be monogamous species with pairs mating for life, were described in a 2007 study as "promiscuous, flighty, and more than a little bit gay". Scientists at 15 aquaria studied 90 seahorses of three species. Of 3,168 sexual encounters, 37% were same-sex acts. Flirting was common (up to 25 potential partners a day of both sexes); only one species (the British spiny seahorse) included faithful representatives, and for these 5 of 17 were faithful, 12 were not. Bisexual behaviour was widespread and considered "both a great surprise and a shock", with big-bellied seahorses of both sexes not showing partner preference. 1,986 contacts were male-female, 836 were female-female and 346 were male-male.

==== Bonobo ====
Among bonobos, males and females engage in sexual behaviour with the same and the opposite sex, with females being particularly noted for engaging in sexual behaviour with each other and at up to 75% of sexual activity being non-reproductive, as being sexually active does not necessarily correlate with their ovulation cycles. Sexual activity occurs between almost all ages and sexes of bonobo societies. Primatologist Frans de Waal believes that bonobos use sexual activity to resolve conflict between individuals. Immature bonobos, contrariwise, perform genital contact when relaxed.

Macaque

Similar same-sex sexual behaviours occur in both male and female macaques. It is thought to be done for pleasure as an erect male mounts and thrusts upon or into another male. Sexual receptivity can also be indicated by red faces and shrieking. Mutual ejaculation after a combination of anal intercourse and masturbation has also been witnessed, although it may be rare. In comparison to socio-sexual behaviours such as dominance displays, homosexual mounts last longer, happen in series, and usually involve pelvic thrusting.

Females are also thought to participate for pleasure as vulvar, perineal, and anal stimulation is part of these interactions. The stimulation can come from their own tails, mounting their partner, thrusting or a combination of these.

==== Dolphin ====
Male bottlenose dolphins have been observed working in pairs to follow or restrict the movement of a female for weeks at a time, waiting for her to become sexually receptive. The same pairs have also been observed engaging in intense sexual play with each other. Janet Mann, a professor of biology and psychology at Georgetown University, argues that the common same-sex behaviour among male dolphin calves is about bond formation and benefits the species evolutionarily. Studies have shown the dolphins later in life are bisexual and the male bonds forged from homosexuality work for protection as well as locating females with which to reproduce.

In 1991, an English man was prosecuted for allegedly having sexual contact with a dolphin. The man was found not guilty after it was revealed at trial that the dolphin was known to tow bathers through the water by hooking his penis around them.

==== Hyena ====
The female spotted hyena has a unique urinary-genital system, closely resembling the penis of the male, called a pseudo-penis. Dominance relationships with strong sexual elements are routinely observed between related females. They are notable for using visible sexual arousal as a sign of submission but not dominance in males as well as females (females have a sizeable erectile clitoris). It is speculated that to facilitate this, their sympathetic and parasympathetic nervous systems may be partially reversed in respect to their reproductive organs.

== Mating behaviour ==
=== Vertebrates ===
==== Mammals ====
Mammals mate by vaginal copulation. To achieve this, the male usually mounts the female from behind. The female may exhibit lordosis in which she arches her back ventrally to facilitate entry of the penis, which is particularly present in elephants, felids, and rodents. Amongst the land mammals, other than humans, only bonobos mate in a face-to-face position, as the females' anatomy seems to reflect, although ventro-ventral copulation has also been observed in Rhabdomys. Some sea mammals copulate in a belly-to-belly position. Some camelids mate in a lying-down position. In most mammals ejaculation occurs after multiple intromissions, but in most primates, copulation consists of one brief intromission. In most ruminant species, a single pelvic thrust occurs during copulation. In most deer species, a copulatory jump also occurs.

During mating, a "copulatory tie" occurs in mammals such as fossas, canids with the exception of African wild dogs, and Japanese martens. A "copulatory lock" also occurs in some primate species, such as Galago senegalensis.

The copulatory behaviour of many mammalian species is affected by sperm competition.

Some females have concealed fertility, making it difficult for males to evaluate if a female is fertile - humans are amongst these species. This is costly as ejaculation expends much energy.

=== Invertebrates ===
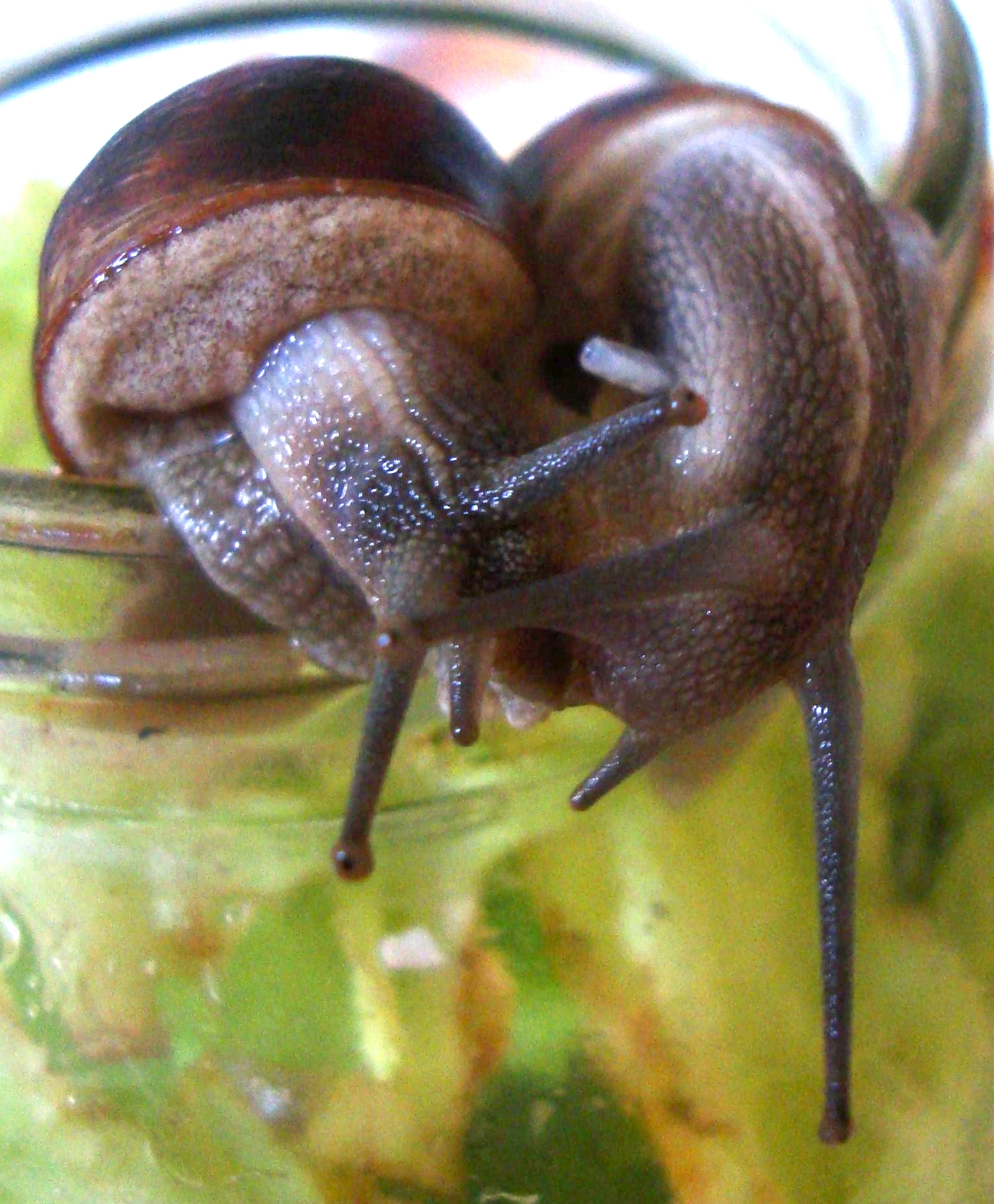
Courting garden snails. The one on the left has fired a love dart into the one on the right.

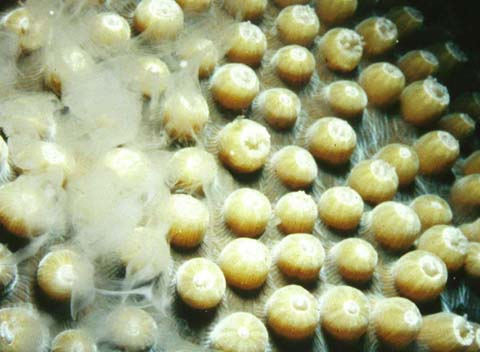
A male star coral releases sperm into the water.

Invertebrates are often hermaphrodites. Some hermaphroditic land snails begin mating with an elaborate tactile courting ritual. The two snails circle around each other for up to six hours, touching with their tentacles, and biting lips and the area of the genital pore, which shows some preliminary signs of the eversion of the penis. As the snails approach mating, hydraulic pressure builds up in the blood sinus surrounding an organ housing a sharpened dart. The dart is made of calcium carbonate or chitin, and is called a love dart. Each snail manoeuvres to get its genital pore in the best position, close to the other snail's body. Then, when the body of one snail touches the other snail's genital pore, it triggers the firing of the love dart. After the snails have fired their darts, they copulate and exchange sperm as a separate part of the mating progression. The love darts are covered with a mucus that contains a hormone-like substance that facilitates the survival of the sperm.

Penis fencing is a mating behaviour engaged in by certain species of flatworm, such as Pseudobiceros bedfordi. Species which engage in the practice are hermaphroditic, possessing both eggs and sperm-producing testes. The species "fence" using two-headed dagger-like penises which are pointed, and white in colour. One organism inseminates the other. The sperm is absorbed through pores in the skin, causing fertilisation.

Corals can be both gonochoristic (unisexual) and hermaphroditic, each of which can reproduce sexually and asexually. Reproduction also allows corals to settle new areas. Corals predominantly reproduce sexually. 25% of hermatypic corals (stony corals) form single sex (gonochoristic) colonies, while the rest are hermaphroditic. About 75% of all hermatypic corals "broadcast spawn" by releasing gametes – eggs and sperm – into the water to spread offspring. The gametes fuse during fertilisation to form a microscopic larva called a planula, typically pink and elliptical in shape. Synchronous spawning is very typical on the coral reef and often, even when multiple species are present, all corals spawn on the same night. This synchrony is essential so that male and female gametes can meet. Corals must rely on environmental cues, varying from species to species, to determine the proper time to release gametes into the water. The cues involve lunar changes, sunset time, and possibly chemical signalling. Synchronous spawning may form hybrids and is perhaps involved in coral speciation.

Butterflies spend much time searching for mates. When the male spots a mate, he will fly closer and release pheromones. He then performs a special courtship dance to attract the female. If the female appreciates the dancing she may join him. Then they join their bodies together end to end at their abdomens. Here, the male passes the sperm to the female's egg-laying tube, which will soon be fertilised by the sperm.

Many animals make plugs of mucus to seal the female's orifice after mating. Normally such plugs are secreted by the male, to block subsequent partners. In spiders the female can assist the process. Spider sex is unusual in that males transfer their sperm to the female on small limbs called pedipalps. They use these to pick their sperm up from their genitals and insert it into the female's sexual orifice, rather than copulating directly. On the 14 occasions a sexual plug was made, the female produced it without assistance from the male. On ten of these occasions the male's pedipalps then seemed to get stuck while he was transferring the sperm (which is rarely the case in other species of spider), and he had great difficulty freeing himself. In two of those ten instances, he was eaten as a result.

In the orb-weaving spider species Zygiella x-notata, individuals engage in a variety of sexual behaviors including male choosiness, mate guarding, and vibrational signaling in courtship.

== Genetic evidence of interspecies sexual activity in humans ==
Research into human evolution confirms that, in some cases, interspecies sexual activity may have been responsible for the evolution of new species (speciation). Analysis of animal genes found evidence that, after humans had diverged from other apes, interspecies mating nonetheless occurred regularly enough to change certain genes in the new gene pool. Researchers found that the X chromosomes of humans and chimps may have diverged around 1.2 million years after the other chromosomes. One possible explanation is that modern humans emerged from a hybrid of human and chimp populations. A 2012 study questioned this explanation, concluding that "there is no strong reason to involve complicated factors in explaining the autosomal data".

== Inbreeding avoidance ==
When close relatives mate, progeny may exhibit the detrimental effects of inbreeding depression. Inbreeding depression is predominantly caused by the homozygous expression of recessive deleterious alleles. Over time, inbreeding depression may lead to the evolution of inbreeding avoidance behaviour. Several examples of animal behaviour that reduce mating of close relatives and inbreeding depression are described next.

Reproductively active female naked mole-rats tend to associate with unfamiliar males (usually non-kin), whereas reproductively inactive females do not discriminate. The preference of reproductively active females for unfamiliar males is interpreted as an adaptation for avoiding inbreeding.

When mice inbreed with close relatives in their natural habitat, there is a significant detrimental effect on progeny survival. In the house mouse, the major urinary protein (MUP) gene cluster provides a highly polymorphic scent signal of genetic identity that appears to underlie kin recognition and inbreeding avoidance. Thus there are fewer matings between mice sharing MUP haplotypes than would be expected if there were random mating.

Meerkat females appear to be able to discriminate the odour of their kin from the odour of their non-kin. Kin recognition is a useful ability that facilitates both cooperation among relatives and the avoidance of inbreeding. When mating does occur between meerkat relatives, it often results in inbreeding depression. Inbreeding depression was evident for a variety of traits: pup mass at emergence from the natal burrow, hind-foot length, growth until independence and juvenile survival.

The grey-sided vole (Myodes rufocanus) exhibits male-biased dispersal as a means of avoiding incestuous matings. Among those matings that do involve inbreeding the number of weaned juveniles in litters is significantly smaller than that from non-inbred litters indicating inbreeding depression.

In natural populations of the bird Parus major (great tit), inbreeding is likely avoided by dispersal of individuals from their birthplace, which reduces the chance of mating with a close relative. Dispersing to avoid inbreeding is a common behavior amongst animals, such as felids and canids, although inbreeding can still occur, albeit rarely.

Toads display breeding site fidelity, as do many amphibians. Individuals that return to natal ponds to breed will likely encounter siblings as potential mates. Although incest is possible, Bufo americanus siblings rarely mate. These toads likely recognise and actively avoid close kins as mates. Advertisement vocalisations by males appear to serve as cues by which females recognise their kin.

== See also ==
- Pre-copulatory isolation mechanisms in animals
- Biology and sexual orientation
- Green Porno, a series of short films about animal mating, enacted by humans, airing on the Sundance Channel
- List of animals displaying homosexual behaviour
- r/K selection theory
- House mouse § Social behavior includes polygamy
- Sexual behavior of dogs
- Sexual behavior of horses
- Non-reproductive sexual behavior in animals
- Sequential hermaphroditism – Sex change as part of the normal life cycle of a species

== Bibliography ==
- Bagemihl, Bruce (1999). Biological Exuberance: Animal Homosexuality and Natural Diversity. St. Martin's Press. ISBN 978-0-312-19239-6.
- Schaller, G.B. (1972). The Serengeti Lion. University of Chicago Press. ISBN 978-0-226-73660-0.
