= Polygyny threshold model =

Evolutionary theory explaining polygyny

Polygyny threshold model graph

The polygyny threshold model is an evolutionary explanation of polygyny, the mating of one male of a species with more than one female. The model shows how females may gain a higher level of biological fitness by mating with a male who already has a mate. The female makes this choice despite other surrounding males because the choice male's genetics, territory, food supply, or other important characteristics are better than those of his competitors, even with two females on the territory.

== Graphical depiction ==
The graphical depiction of the model presented in Gordon Orians' 1969 paper is often used to explain the concept. The graph shows two curves on a graph of biological fitness versus environmental quality. Environmental quality refers to the quality of the male's territory. The left curve, labeled monogamous, is the perceived biological fitness for a female entering into a monogamous relationship with a given male. The right curve, labeled bigamous, shows the fitness of the same female entering into a relationship with a different male who already has one female mate but who has defended more resources.

The second curve has a roughly similar shape to the first curve, but shifted to the right some amount. The given shapes of the curve will change with other intrinsic factors like genetic quality and male paternal investment.

The designation "female" and "male" here are oft accurate; however, in some mating systems the operational sex ratio leans towards females, who then have motivation to engage in resource defence polyandry (provided the requirements of economic defendability are met).

The intersection of the vertical dotted line on the left with the monogamous curve indicates the biological fitness of a female who chooses a monogamous male with a lower environmental quality. The intersection of the vertical dotted line on the right with the bigamous curve indicates the biological fitness of a female who enters into a bigamous relationship with the male of a higher environmental quality. The difference between these two intersection points, labeled PT, is the polygyny threshold. It is the gain of environmental quality for the female when she chooses the bigamous relationship and thus the minimum environmental quality difference necessary to make bigamy beneficial for the female.

Also important is the vertical line drawn from the intersection of the line with the bigamy curve to the monogamy curve above. This represents the fitness gain of a female who chooses monogamy over bigamy due to, here, resource holding differences.

Orians predicted that animals exhibiting resource defence polygyny, such as the fish Neolamprologus pulcher would fit to this model when living in successive habitats, where territory quality is very variable. Using the territory quality to decide whether to pursue a monogamous or polygynous mating relationship. This is shown in the red-winged blackbird by Pribil and Searcy (2001). Female red-winged blackbirds prefer to mate with males with territories over water and also unmated males. The females were given a choice between unmated males or previously mated males with the superior territories over water. In 12 out of 14 trials (86%) females chose the already mated male with the superior territory.

== Costs of polygyny ==
According to William A. Searcy and Ken Yasukawa, the term cost of polygyny is defined as the net costs of polygyny after the summation of all of the component costs and benefits. Costs include less parental care and increased competition between females for the male's provision and food among other resources. A benefit could be group defense of the territory and resources. Searcy and Yasukawa graphically defined the distance between curve 1 (monogamous line) and curve 2 (bigamous line) of the polygyny threshold model graph (see above) to be the cost of polygyny. N. B. Davies further defined it as the cost of sharing in order to be clear that the term refers to the fitness cost to females that are breeding on the same territory.

Searcy and Yasukawa conducted studies on Pennsylvania red-winged blackbirds that showed that females would mate on territory already settled by another female, which indicated that there was no cost of polygyny. However, in a later study by Pribil and Picman conducted on Ontario populations of red-winged blackbirds the results indicated that there was indeed a cost of polygyny. The females in this study were given a choice between adjacent territories, one in which there was already a settled female (defined by many researchers as the primary female) and the other in which there was no female present. In all 16 situations, the females chose the unsettled land in which she could be monogamous. Davies, Krebs, and West, in their textbook An Introduction to Behavioural Ecology, cited another Pribil study noting the polygyny cost to the red-winged blackbird females. The effect of polygyny made them less effective mothers when they were removed and taken to a more isolated population, proven by the fact that the mothers from monogamous relationships had better adaptation to the new environment. In an earlier text, Davies explores the examples of costs, showing that the cost is not always to the second and subsequently joining females. He asserts that there are situations in which the cost is shared between the primary and secondary female. He also mentions scenarios in which the primary female receives a decrease in her fitness upon addition of the secondary female to the harem.

There are many other studies concerning the polygyny threshold model and costs to polygyny using other species. Staffan Bensch conducted a study on the great reed warbler that showed the only cost of polygyny to these females to be higher mortality of nestlings that were belonging to the primary female. Johnson, Kermott, and Lien conducted a study on the house wren (Troglodytes aedon) showing that there were inherent polygyny costs to these female populations, also. The secondary females lost more of the broods largely because of starvation, and they also experienced lesser reproductive success in other areas. One of the main factors in their decreased fitness was less male aid. Kyle Summers and David Earn studied female poison frogs, genus Dendrobates, to see if the polygyny costs drove the evolution of the parental care system from a female care to biparental or paternal care. They deduced that the costs could not be concluded to be the sole cause of this parental transition. The numerous studies concerning polygyny costs show the different factors that not only cause these costs, but are also affected by these costs.

== Polygyny threshold model in humans ==
While a variety of mating patterns are present and often sanctioned across human societies (including monogamy, polyandry and polygyny), most human relationships are monogamous. Studies in human populations have demonstrated a decline of polygyny in highly stratified societies where rival wealth is concentrated by a small class of rich elite (economic inequality).

== See also ==
- Hypergamy
