= Polygyny in animals =

Class of mating system in non-human species

Polygyny (/pəˈlɪdʒɪni/; from Neo-Greek πολυγυνία, from πολύ- (polú-) 'many' and γυνή (gunḗ) 'woman, wife') is a mating system in which one male lives and mates with multiple females but each female only mates with a few males. Systems where several females mate with several males are defined either as promiscuity or polygynandry. Lek mating is frequently regarded as a form of polygyny, because one male mates with many females, but lek-based mating systems differ in that the male has no attachment to the females with whom he mates, and that mating females lack attachment to one another.

Polygyny is typical of one-male, multi-female groups and can be found in many species including: elephant seal, spotted hyena, gorilla, red-winged prinia, house wren, hamadryas baboon, common pheasant, red deer, Bengal tiger, Xylocopa sonorina, Anthidium manicatum and elk. Often in polygynous systems, females will provide the majority of parental care.

== Mating systems ==
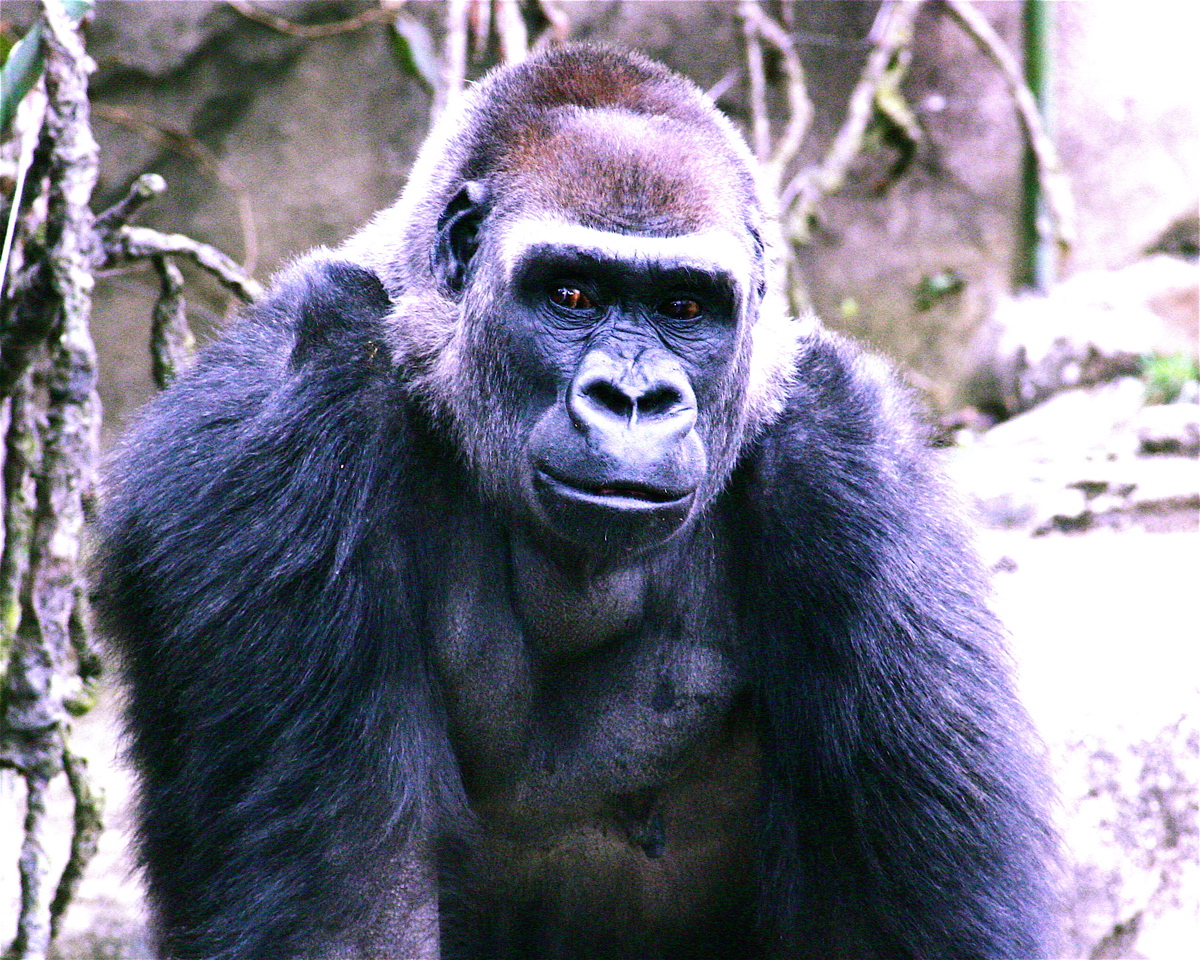
Gorilla

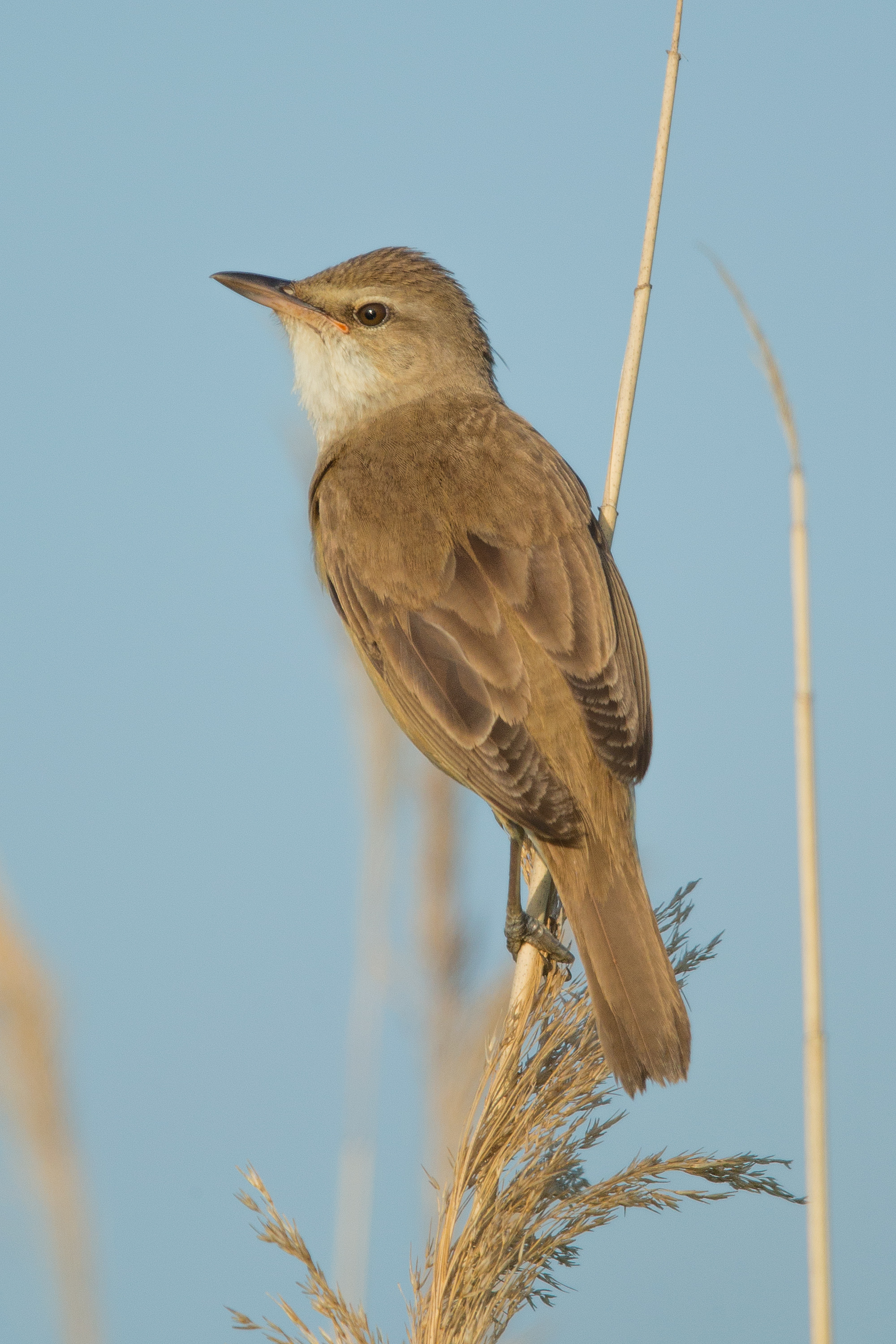
Great reed warbler

When two animals mate, they both share an interest in the success of the offspring, though often to different extremes. Unless the male and female are perfectly monogamous, meaning that they mate for life and take no other partners, even after the original mate's death, the amount of parental care will vary. Instead, it is much more common for polygynous mating to happen. Polygynous structures (excluding leks) are estimated to occur in up to 90% of mammals.

Polygyny in birds occurs infrequently when compared to mammals, as monogamy is most commonly observed. Evolutionarily speaking, polygyny in birds might have evolved because many females do not require male support to care for their offspring. Because females do not need extra help raising their nests, males can afford to invest in multiple females. Nonetheless, male parental care is often found in many polygynous territorial bird species, leading to female competition for male assistance. Most often, males will seek a second female to impregnate, once the first female has laid her eggs.

Strongly polygynous or monogamous species display increased female–female aggression. Many factors affect female aggression including predator density, habitat quality, nest spacing, and territory size. Often, females will fight for resources from the male, such as food and nest protection. The female disadvantages of mating with an already-mated male bird can be overcome with ample resources provided by the male, resulting in female choice.

=== Emlen and Oring mating systems model ===
In 1977, Stephen T. Emlen and Lewis W. Oring created a mating systems model that shows how resource distribution affects female living patterns and subsequently, mating systems. In a mating system, the limiting sex (usually females) is the one that the limited sex (usually males) tries to monopolize. The combination of resource distribution, parental care, and female breeding synchrony determines what mating strategies the limited sex will employ. Polygyny will occur when resources are localized and females form clusters, making it easier for males to control them. The various types of polygyny result because of the differential access individuals have to resources.

== Types of polygyny ==
When females continually move and are not spatially stable, males pursue a mate defense strategy. When the females are clumped, four types of polygyny occur.

	Harems	Multimale polygyny	Sequential polygyny	Scramble competition polygyny
Small or large	Small	Large	Small	Large
Stable or unstable	Stable	Stable	Unstable	Unstable
Species examples	Humans, elephant seals	Savanna baboons, Cape buffalo	Humans, Woodcocks, elephants	Thirteen-lined ground squirrels, Coquerel's dwarf lemurs, okapis

(Adapted from Dr. Susan Alberts)

When females are spatially stable in and around a resource, males pursue a resource defense strategy and polygyny occurs when the females are clumped and the offspring require little to no parental care (e.g. yellow-bellied marmots, orange-rumped honeyguides).

== Costs and benefits for males ==
=== Costs ===
In polygynous systems there is less genetic diversity due to the fact that one male sires all of the offspring. Additionally, it is difficult for males to monopolize many females at once, leading to extra-pair copulations in which a few females are able to mate with another male, while not being watched by the breeding male. (Some studies also show that EPC is less common in polygyny compared to monogamy.) These breeding males also have short tenure, and it is common for groups of males who do not have harems to attack a breeding male in order to gain reproductive access to his females.

In some cases, polygyny can lead to aggression between males. An example of species that exhibit male-male aggression under polygynous system is Allobates femoralis. Physical aggression can be induced by territorial defense and competition in courtship. Especially, during the courtship march, a competing male can intercept the female while the male who originally courted the female searches for an oviposition site. In this case, the physical aggression between males can last about 15 minutes until one of the males leave the site.

=== Benefits ===
The largest advantage for males in a polygynous mating system is the increased fitness and reproductive success of the lone male because he will father all the offspring. Being the sole male of a harem is highly advantageous for the male because he has a much higher chance of his progeny surviving, which means he is passing on his genes to more individuals.

== Costs and benefits for females ==
=== Costs ===
Due to the fact that one male sires all of the offspring there is less genetic diversity in the community, which is disadvantageous to females. Additionally, females sometimes encounter infanticide, which is when a breeding male is overthrown and a new breeding male becomes dominant and kills all of their current offspring, as he has not fathered them. Because the females no longer have offspring to nurse, they will go into estrous sooner, which allows the new breeding male to mate with the females earlier.

=== Benefits ===
Some females willingly choose polygyny in order to gain access to the "best" resources available. In these cases, the benefits from superior resource access must outweigh the opportunity cost of giving up monogamous parental care by a male. They also can get support from the same group of other females when in danger, like a female lion.

Females in polygyny may have less extra-pair copulation. In socially polygynous birds, EPC is only half as common as in socially monogamous birds. Some ethologists consider this finding to be support for the 'female choice' hypothesis of mating systems in birds. A polygynous leader male will always be the best mating choice before he is beaten by another male, so it is harder for females to find a partner better than their mate in polygyny as compared to monogamy. This might reduce the number of females at risk for EPC once their mate finds out.

== Polygyny threshold model ==
Polygyny threshold model graph

An explanation for why polygynous systems persist is explained by the polygyny threshold model. This model demonstrates the link between female reproductive success and territory quality or the quality of a breeding situation. The polygyny threshold model also shows the effects of female reproductive success when multiple females in the same territory mate with one male. In this situation, the female has the option of breeding with an unmated male in a poor-quality territory or with an already-mated male in a high-quality territory. The second breeding female will receive fewer resources from the male than the first breeding female. However, if the bigamous threshold is higher than the second female's original resource threshold, the female will enter into a polygynous mating system, since she would still benefit from acquiring more resources. The polygyny threshold model can be applied to more than two females, provided there are enough resources to support them.

=== The great reed warbler ===
The great reed warbler (Acrocephalus arundinaceus) is one of the few bird species that is polygynous and has a harem. Males provide resources to their harem, such as nest protection and varying levels of parental care. Females in the harem are able to breed at the same time, indicating that harem size and the number of male offspring are related.

The most important factor when determining male fitness is the order in which he arrives to the territory. Males who arrive earlier increase the likelihood that they will obtain good nesting sites, improving their odds for attracting more females. Additionally, a greater song repertoire is correlated with an increase in harem size and increased male fitness because females prefer to mate with males that have a more extensive song repertoire.

It is also possible that broad song repertoires are a supplementary cue for a good mate, in conjunction with male territory size and quality. A wide-ranging song repertoire develops with age, and older males are more likely to dominate better territories, giving a plausible reason as to why females prefer older males.

Although highly debated, female choice in the great reed warbler may be explained by the good genes theory. False paternity and decreased offspring survival are two factors which might contribute to a decrease in male fitness.

== Evolutionary significance ==
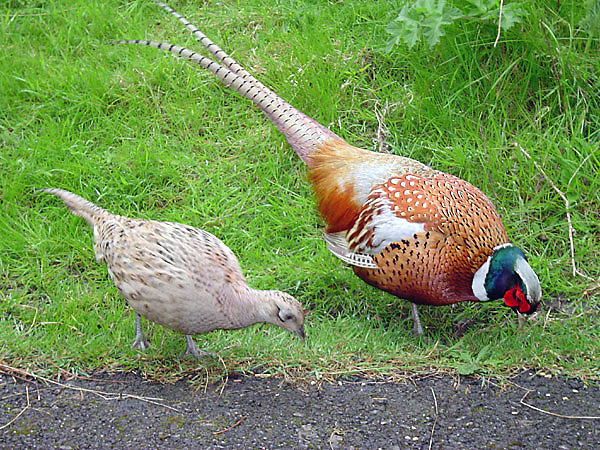
Male (right) and female (left) pheasant

From an evolutionary standpoint, the most predominant characteristic that is often found in polygynous mating systems is extreme sexual dimorphism. Sexual dimorphism, or the difference in size or appearance between males and females, gives males an advantage in fights against each other to demonstrate dominance and win over harems. Sexual dimorphism can present in larger body size and canine size.

Polygyny is beneficial in particular to the male, because he has a greater increase in fitness and reproductive success. This increase consequently reduces the genetic diversity of the community, often leading to increased inbreeding. However, polygyny is not a particularly beneficial mating system for females, because their mate choice is limited to one male.

Extra-pair copulations are a strategy used by females to avoid the sexual conflict caused by polygyny, allowing them access to better mate choice. Unlike in males, extra-pair copulations are advantageous for females because they present females with more mate choice as well as increase the genetic diversity of the community. Extra-pair copulations exemplify sexual conflict, a situation in which one behavior is advantageous for one sex, but disadvantageous for the other.

=== Evidence of female choice ===
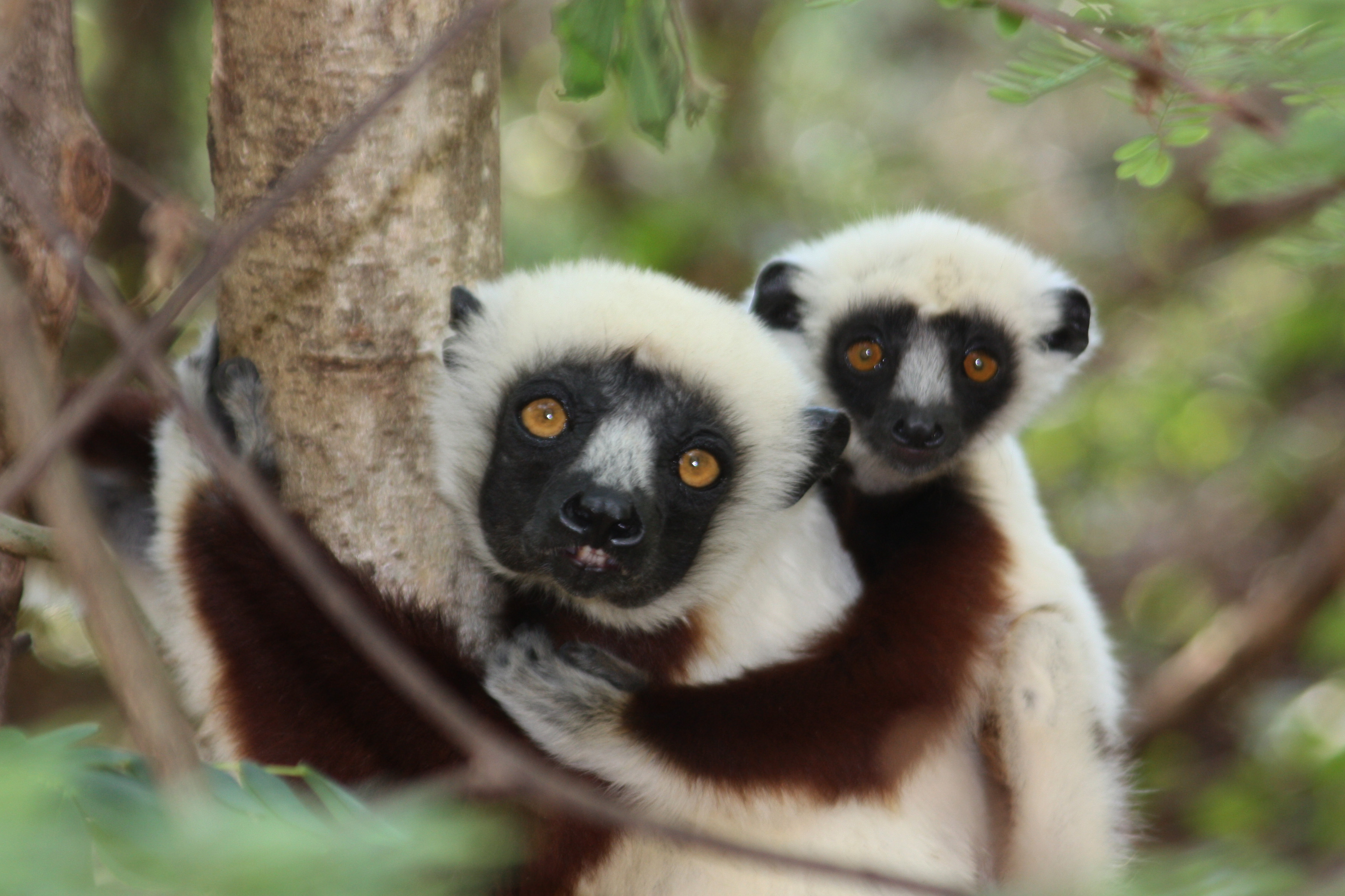
Coquerel's sifaka lemurs

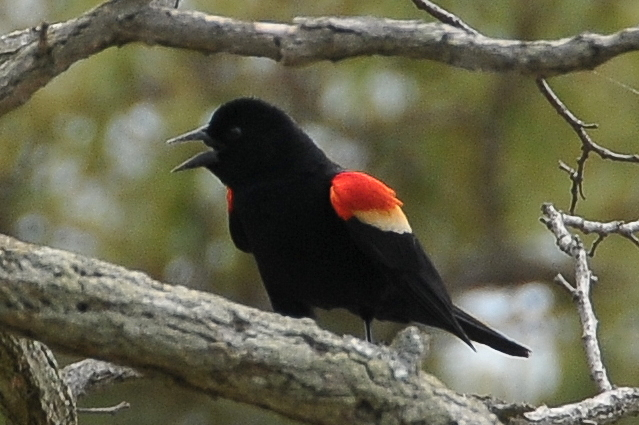
Red-winged blackbird

Female choice, the act in which a female chooses her mate based on the attractiveness of his qualities, is very common in polygynous systems. In these cases, females will choose males based on secondary sexual characteristics, which may indicate access to better and more resources.

For example, female great reed warblers (Acrocephalus arundinaceus) have a preference to mate with males with larger song repertoires, because this indicates that they are older and may have better nesting territories. Also, female grayling butterflies (Hipparchia semele) choose males based on their performance in flight competitions, where the winning male settles in the territory best for oviposition. Female Coquerel's sifaka (Propithecus coquereli) mate with the winners of battles for the harem because the male has shown that he is stronger than another, potentially offering more protection from predators. Female red-winged blackbirds (Agelaius phoeniceus) exhibit aggression toward other females upon intrusion into the harem, usually heightened around breeding season. This behavior demonstrates that the females are protecting their breeding male from intruding females, suggesting they are preventing female access to a desirable mate.

== See also ==
- Polygyny
- Animal sexual behaviour#Polygyny
