= Resource defense polygyny =

In animal behavior, resource defense polygyny is a mating strategy where a male is able to support multiple female mates by competing with other males for access to a resource. In such a system, males are territorial. Because male movement is restricted, female-female competition for a male also results. Males capable of maintaining a larger territory are said to have greater resource holding power. It is one of the three major types of polygyny, the other two being female defense polygyny and leks.

== Examples ==
A male yellow headed blackbird surveys his territory.

Resource defense polygyny is a common strategy in insects. For examples, damselflies in the family Calopterygidae typically display resource defense polygyny, in which territorial males guard riverine habitat that is sought after by females for egg deposition. Within a species there may be a territorial and nonterritorial morph.

Many bird species also display resource defense polygyny. The yellow headed blackbird is an example, where a male may have multiple females nesting in his territory.

== See also ==
- Polygyny threshold model
