= Extra-pair copulation =

Non-monogamy in monogamous species

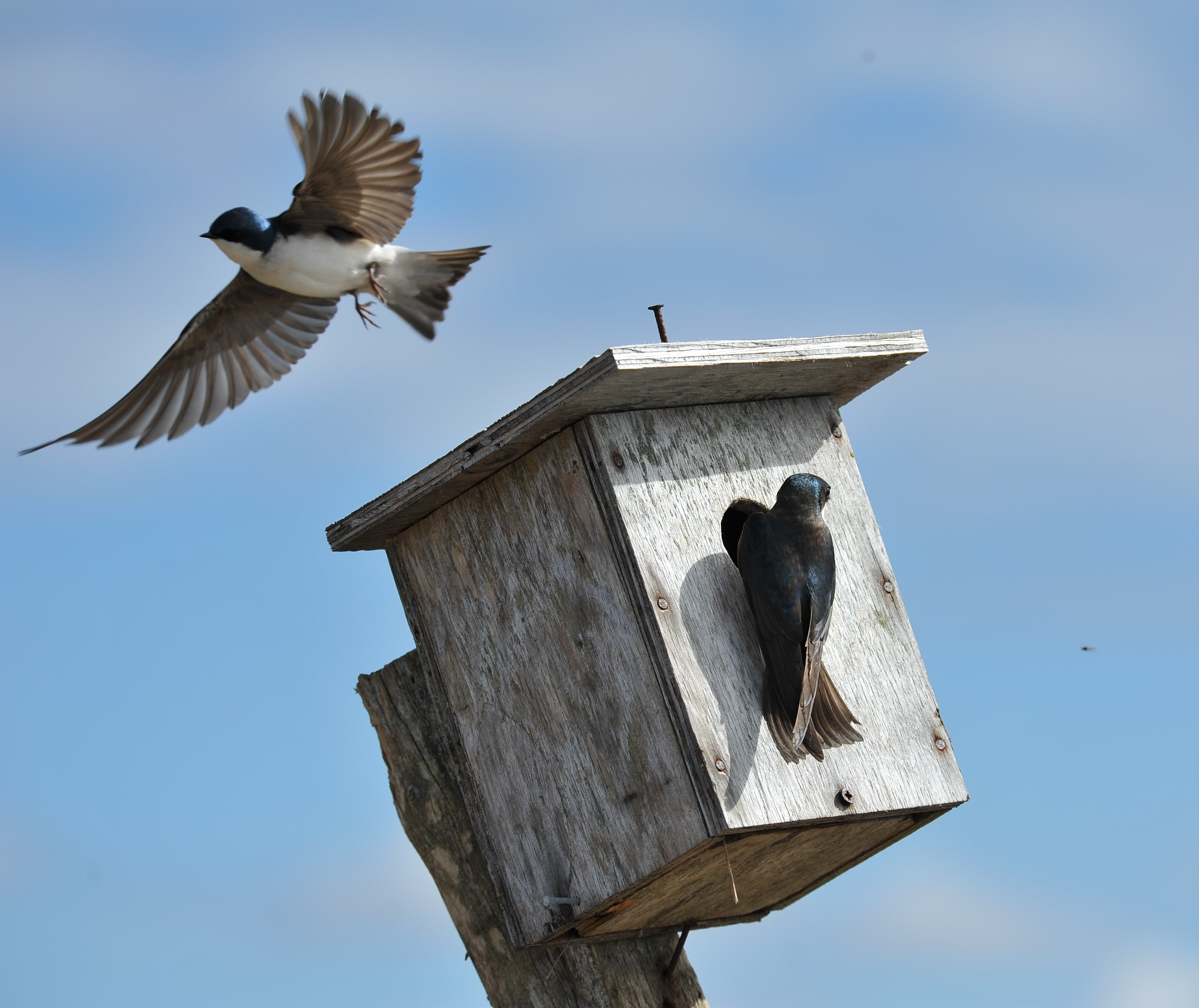
In tree swallow (Tachycineta bicolor) nests, most broods contain at least one extra-pair egg.

Extra-pair copulation (EPC) is a mating behaviour in socially monogamous species wherein one of the members of the pair breeds with an organism outside the bound pair. EPC in the animal kingdom has mostly been studied in birds and mammals.

Extra-pair copulation is not to be confused with cuckoldry (a concept of social sciences). In socially monogamic mammals (species who make a pair to share resources and raise offspring), genetic monogamy (species who mate exclusively with one partner) is extremely rare.

As well as humans, EPC has been found in many other socially monogamous species. When EPC occurs in animals which show sustained female-male social bonding, this can lead to extra-pair paternity (EPP), in which the female reproduces with an extra-pair male, and hence produces EPO (extra-pair offspring).

Due to the obvious reproductive success benefits for males, it used to be thought that males exclusively controlled EPCs. However, it is now known that females also seek EPC in some situations.

== Costs and benefits ==
For males, a number of theories are proposed to explain extra-pair copulations. One such hypothesis is that males maximize their reproductive success by copulating with as many females as possible outside of a pair bond relationship because their parental investment is lower, meaning they can copulate and leave the female with minimum risk to themselves. Females, on the other hand, have to invest a lot more in their offspring; extra-pair copulations produce a greater cost because they put the resources that their mate can offer at risk by copulating outside the relationship. Despite this, females do seek out extra pair copulations, and, because of the risk, there is more debate about the evolutionary benefits for females.

Some argue that EPC is one way in which sexual selection is operating for genetic benefits which is why the extra-pair males involved in EPC seem to be a non-random subset. There is some evidence for this in birds.

Some argue that genetic benefits for offspring is not the reason females participate in EPC. A meta-analysis of genetic benefits of EPC in 55 bird species found that extra-pair offspring were not more likely to survive than within-pair offspring. Also, extra-pair males did not show significantly better "good-genes" traits than within-pair males, except for being slightly larger overall.

Another potential explanation for the occurrence of EPC in organisms where females solicit EPC is that the alleles controlling such behaviour are intersexually pleiotropic. Under the hypothesis of intersexual antagonistic pleiotropy, the benefit males get from EPC cancels out the negative effects of EPC for females. Thus, the allele that controls EPC in both organisms would persist, even if it would be detrimental to the fitness of females. Similarly, according to the hypothesis of intrasexual antagonistic pleiotropy, the allele that controls EPC in females also controls a behaviour that is under positive selection, such as receptiveness towards within-pair copulation.

== Reproductive strategies ==
To increase reproductive success, males often seek to gain extra-pair fertilizations (EPFs) while preventing their own females from being fertilized by other males. Extra-pair copulation in species often lead to defense mechanics, specially in males, such as mate guarding and sperm competition. Timing and duration of in-pair and out-of-pair matings do not seem not influence fecundity as a strategy to avoid extra-pair copulations.

=== Mate guarding ===
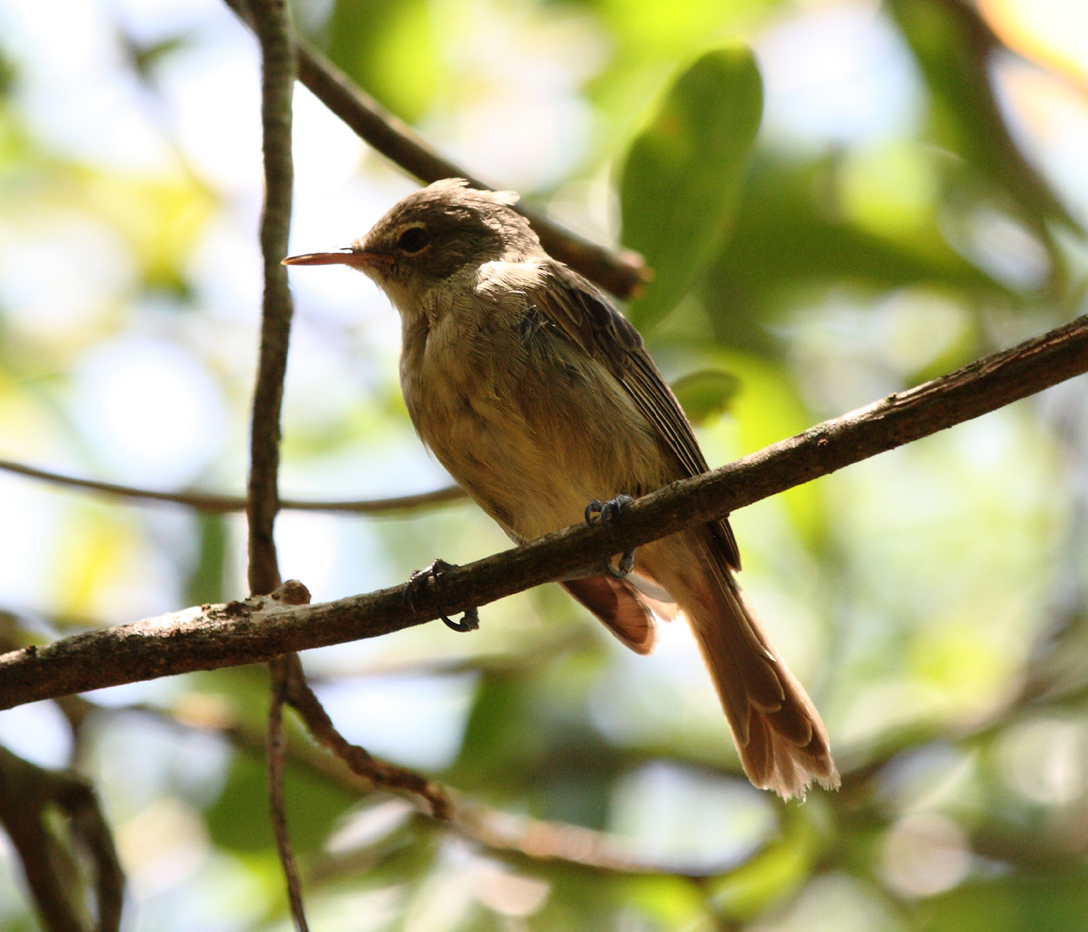
Seychelles warblers (Acrocephalus sechellensis) display effective mate guarding strategies.

Males may ensure their paternity by constantly following the female around and thwarting any extra-pair copulation attempts in the female's fertile period, a behavior known as mate guarding. Males follow the female more frequently and closely when other pairs of the same species live near. In the western bluebird, mate guarding increased the frequency of copulation by increasing the acceptance of the female.

Male seychelles warblers that guard their females more closely are less likely to have offspring from other partners in their nest when compared to mates that were induced to stop mate guarding during the pair female's fertile period. The probability of having an egg from another male increased together with the number of days during the fertile period for which mate guarding was artificially stopped.

=== Sperm competition ===
There are two main competitive ejaculatory strategies in species that are socially monogamous but not genetically monogamous: One wherein only certain males are bounded in pairs and other exclusively mate opportunistically ("sneaks and guarders"), and a second wherein all males are bounded.

In the sneaks and guarders system, such roles are constant: Guarders do not often become sneaks and vice-versa. The paired males are assumed to not know whether their bound female has mated opportunistically or not. If sneak matings are too frequent, the bound male may expend more resources on the sperm. If the bounded male of the pair detects a sneak mating, it increases their sperm dose in the female tract.

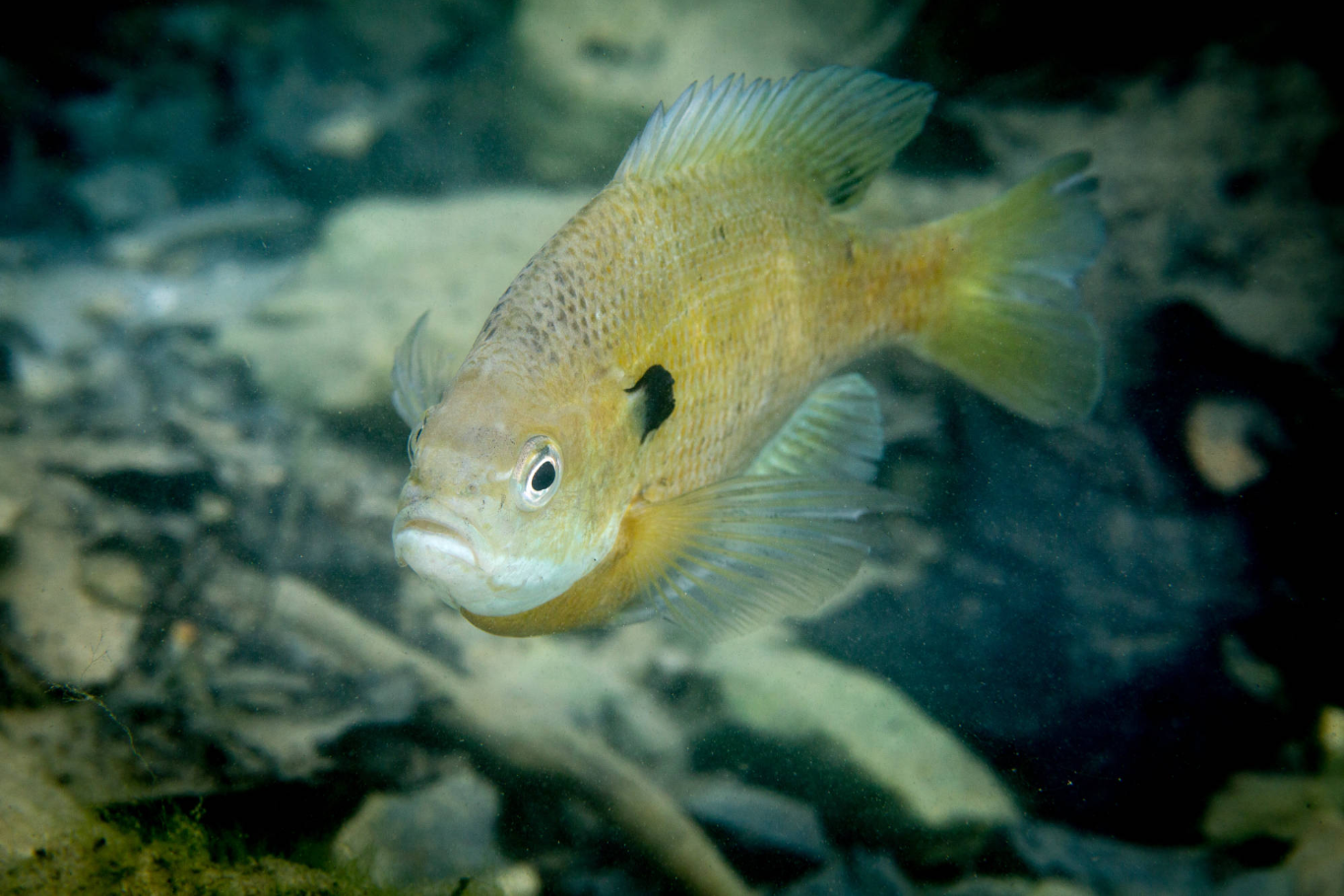
Bluegill sunfish (Lepomis macrochirus) have a sneak-guarder dynamic.

In the bluegill sunfish, guards make nests, court females and help with parental care. Sneaks mimic females and dart in and out of nests in an attempt to ejaculate between the spawning pair. Sneaks fertilize more eggs than guards.

In the system wherein all males are bounded, the roles of "guarder" and "sneak" are not fixed, as all "guarders" may become "sneaks" should the opportunity arise. In this system, when performing an EPC, a male should expend more resources in the sperm than when breeding in their bound pair in order to compete with the female's other partner and obtain a higher chance of paternity. If the EPC is detected, the bounded male should similarly greatly increase their sperm dose in the female reproductive tract in order to predominate the fertilization.

== In birds ==
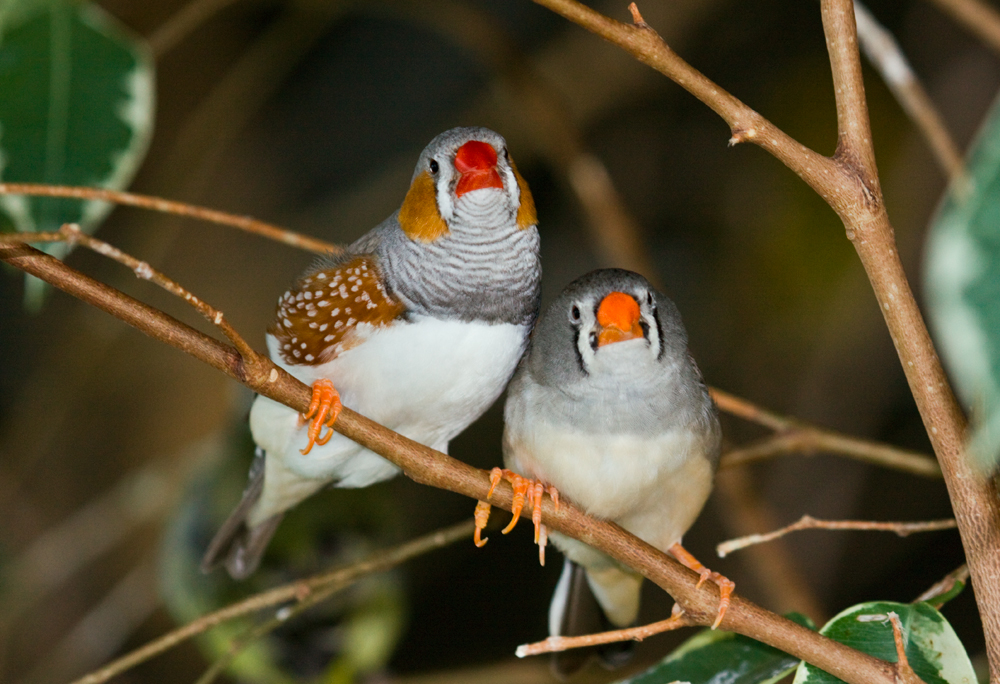
Pair of zebra finches: Bird Kingdom, Niagara Falls, Ontario, Canada

Extra-pair copulation is common in birds. For example, zebra finches, although socially monogamous, are not sexually monogamous and hence do engage in extra-pair courtship and attempts at copulation. In a laboratory study, female zebra finches copulated over several days, many times with one male and only once with another male. Results found that significantly more eggs were fertilised by the extra-pair male than expected proportionally from just one copulation versus many copulations with the other male. EPC proportion varies between different species of birds. For example, in eastern bluebirds, studies have shown that around 35% of offspring is due to EPC. Some of the highest levels of EPP are found in the New Zealand hihi or stitchbird (Notiomystis cincta), in which up to 79% of offspring are sired by EPC. EPC can have significant consequences for parental care, as shown in azure-winged magpie (Cyanopica cyanus).

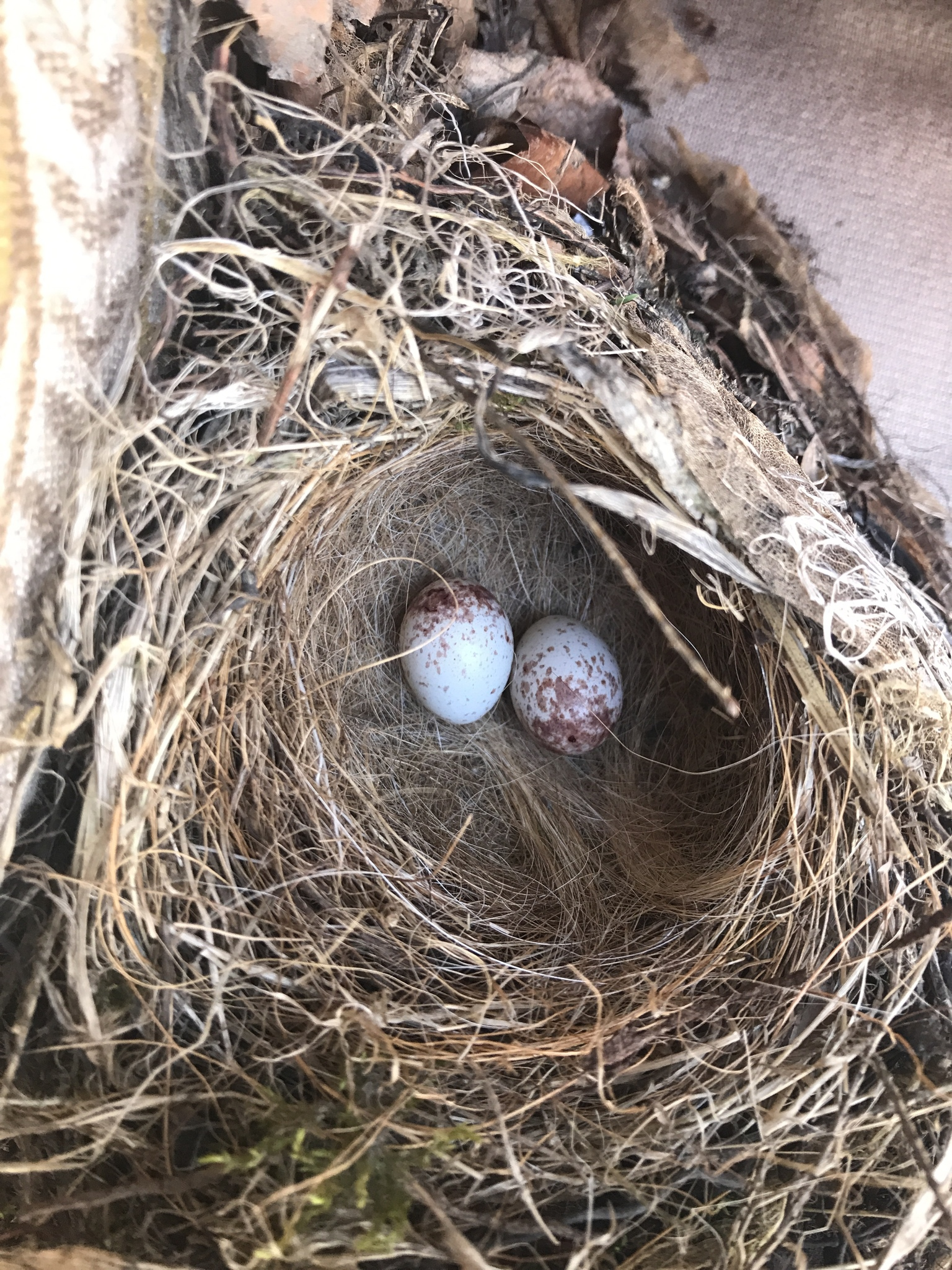
Black-capped chickadee nest.

In socially polygynous birds, EPC is only half as common as in socially monogamous birds. Some ethologists consider this finding to be support for the 'female choice' hypothesis of mating systems in birds.

In swallows, males with longer tails are involved in EPC more than those with shorter tails. Also female swallows with a shorter-tailed within-pair mates are more likely to conduct EPC than those whose mates have longer tails. A similar pattern has been found for black-capped chickadees, in which all extra-pair males had higher rank than the within-pair males.

== In mammals ==
Monogamy is rare in mammals but more frequent in primates (62% of ~177 species are classified and socially monogamic) and treeshrews. As well, EPC has been shown in monogamous mammals, such as the white-handed gibbon and the large treeshrew.

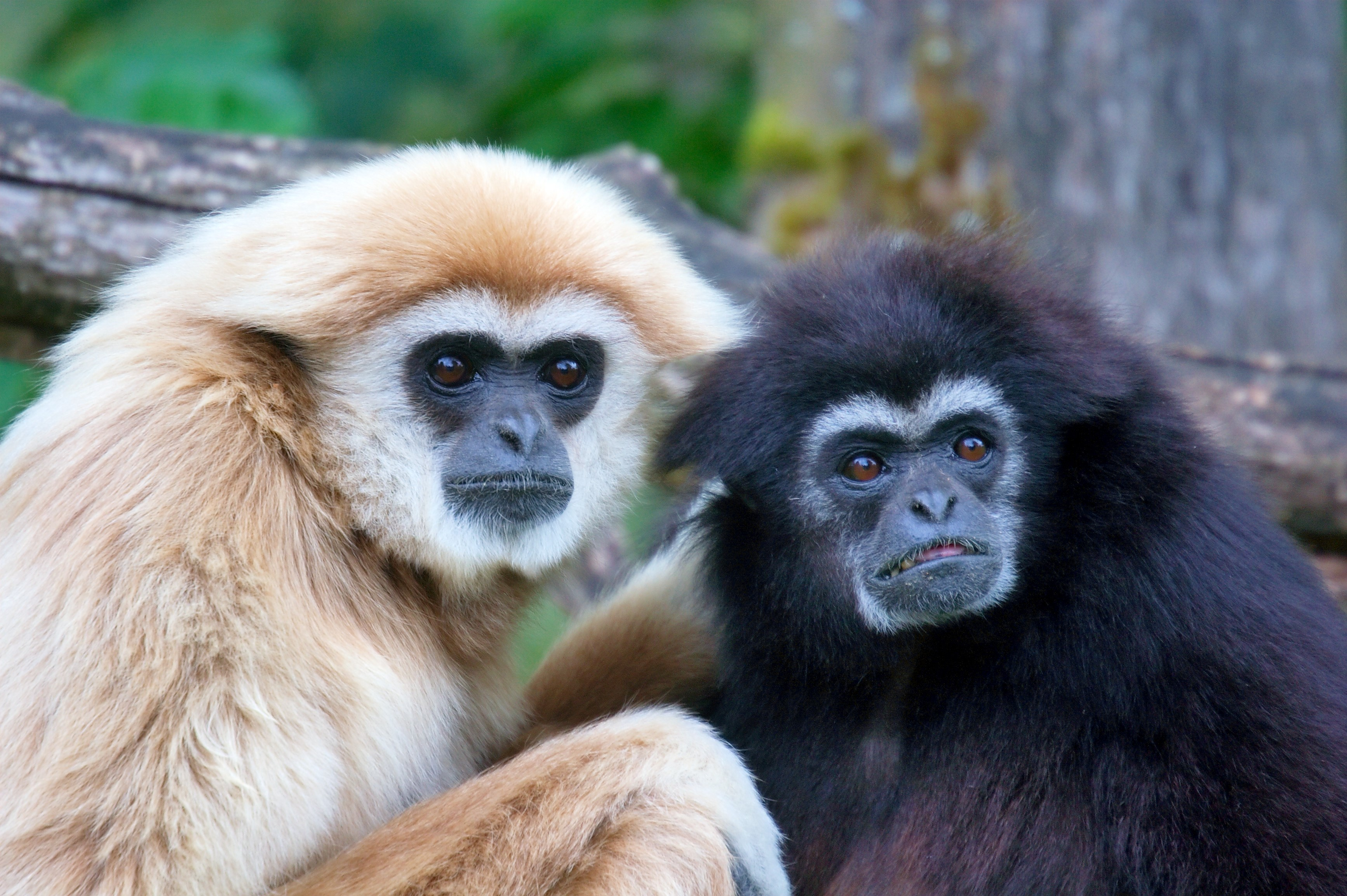
Pair of white-handed gibbons

About half of large treeshrew offspring being sired by males that were not the presumed partner of the mother, with multiple paternity being common. In this treeshrew species, the male-female pairs occupy joint territories but forage and sleep alone, making mate guarding behaviors ineffective. A study of one group found 88% in-pair copulation and 12% extra-pair copulation in the white-handed gibbon.

There is much variability in rates of EPC in mammals. One study found that this disparity in EPC is better predicted by the differing social structures of different mammals, rather than differing types of pair bonding. For example, EPC was lower in species who live in pairs compared to those who live in solitary or family structures.
