= Sexual practices between men =

Sexual activity between men

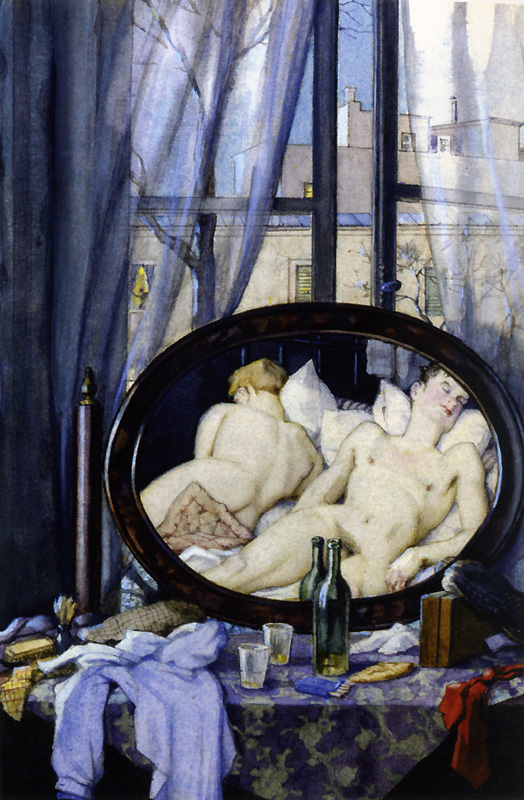
The Lovers by Konstantin Somov

Sexual practices involving men who have sex with men (MSM), regardless of their sexual orientation, can include oral sex, manual sex, anal sex, and frot. Evidence shows that sex between men is significantly underreported in surveys.

== Behaviors ==
Various sex positions may be performed during sexual activity between men. Evidence shows that sex between men is significantly underreported in surveys due to social desirability bias.

A 2011 survey of 18,000 MSM showed that oral sex was most commonly practiced, followed by mutual masturbation, with anal intercourse in third place. A 2011 survey by The Journal of Sexual Medicine found similar results for U.S. gay and bisexual men. Kissing a partner on the mouth (74.5%), oral sex (72.7%), and partnered masturbation (68.4%) were the three most common behaviors. The most common sexual act practiced was holding their partner romantically, kissing partner on mouth, solo masturbation, mutual masturbation, and frotting.

=== Oral sex ===
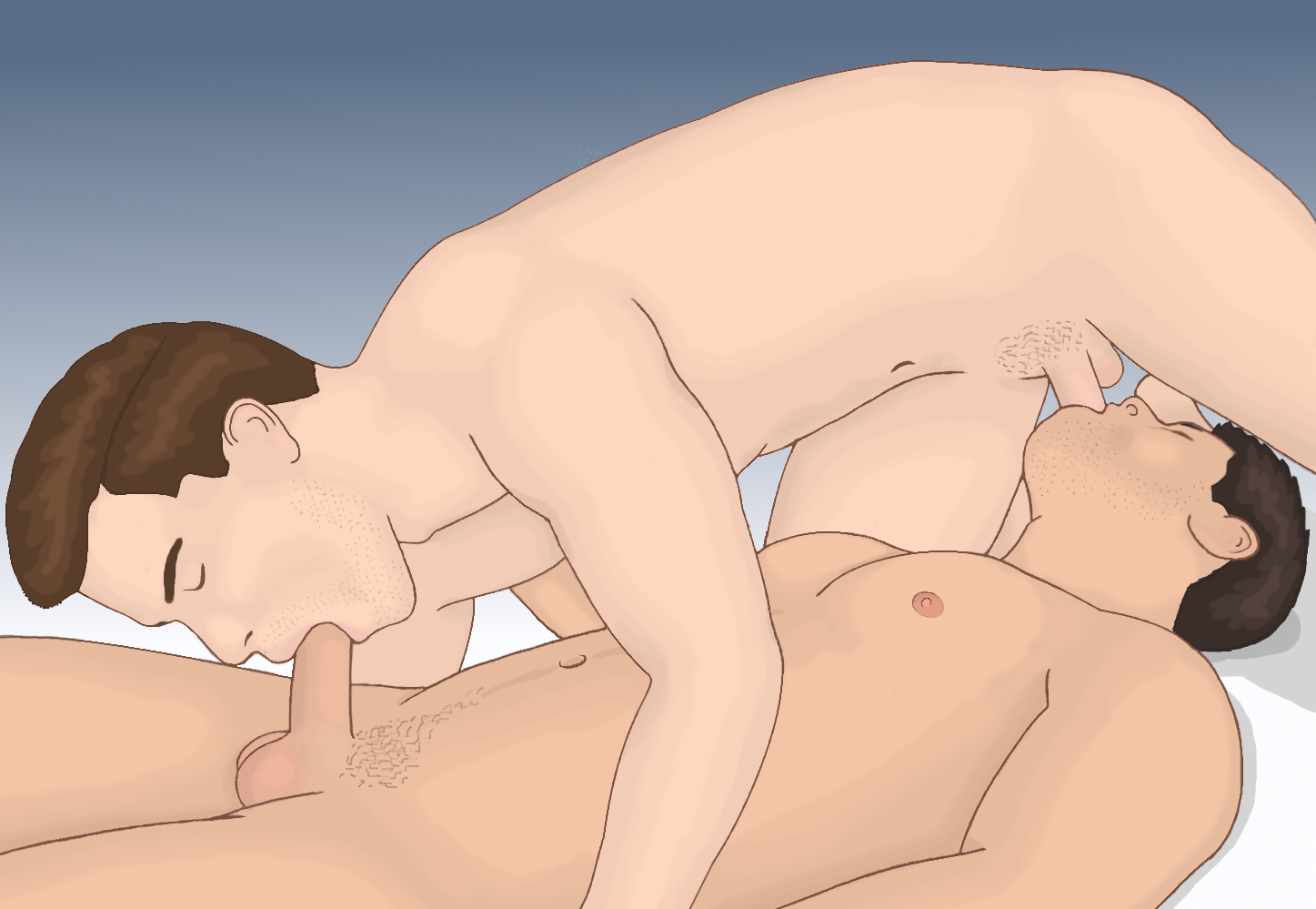
Two men performing fellatio on each other in the 69 position.

MSM may engage in oral sex, including fellatio, using the mouth to stimulate a partner's penis or scrotum.

Anilingus is a form of oral sex, using the tongue and lips to stimulate a partner's anus.

=== Manual sex ===
Manual sex is another non-penetrative sex act that can occur between men. This includes handjobs, using one's hands to stimulate a partner's penis or scrotum. In a similar way but with the lower limbs it is possible to practice footjobs between two men, using the toes or the soles of the feet.

Fingering the anus is a form of manual sex, with digital stimulation of a partner's anal area.

=== Anal sex ===
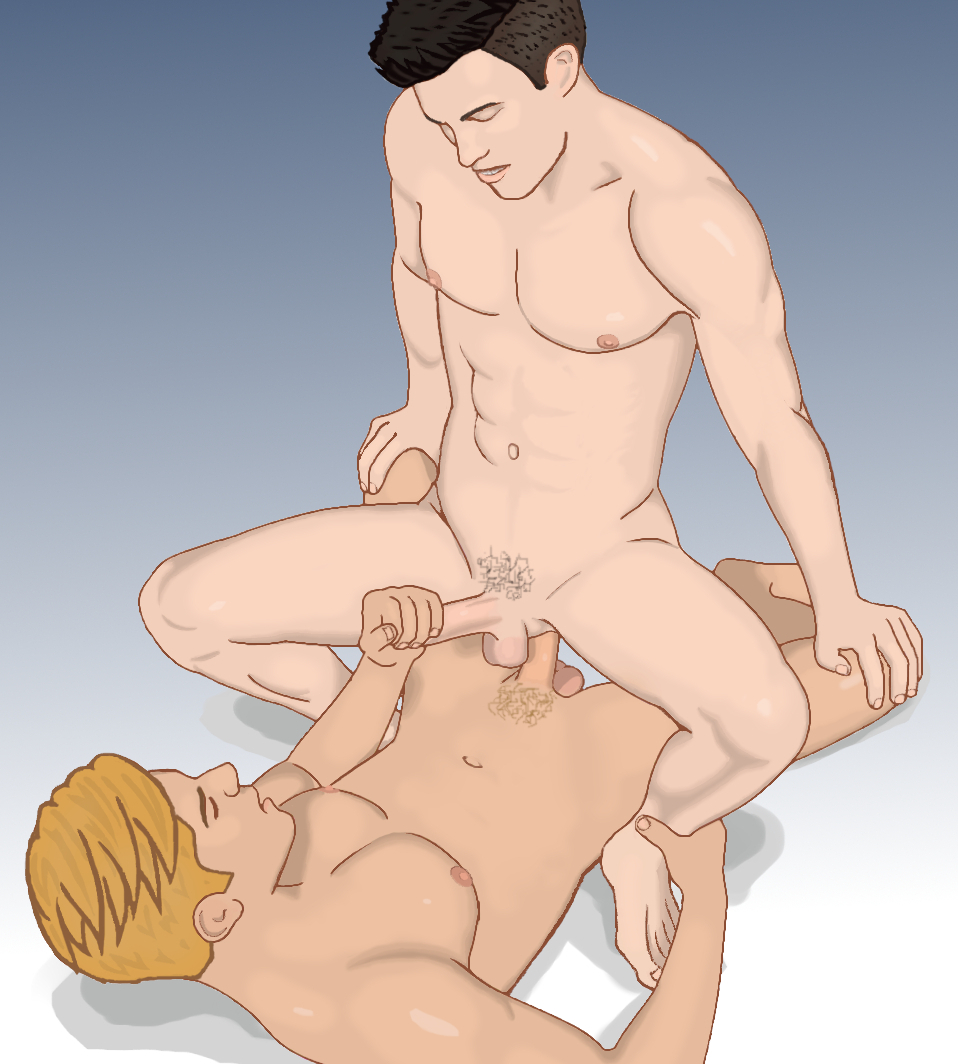
The penetrating man lying on his back is the "top" and the receiving man is the "bottom" in the cowboy position.

Historically, anal sex has been popularly associated with male homosexuality. Many MSM, however, do not engage in anal sex.

Among men who have anal sex with other men, the partner who inserts his penis may be referred to as the top, the one being penetrated may be referred to as the bottom, and those who enjoy either role may be referred to as versatile. When MSM engage in anal sex without using a condom, this is referred to as bareback sex. Pleasure, pain, or both may accompany anal sex. While the nerve endings in the anus can provide pleasurable feelings, an orgasm may be achieved through receptive anal penetration by indirect stimulation of the prostate. A study by the National Survey of Sexual Health and Behavior (NSSHB) indicated that men who self-report taking a receptive position during anal sex in their last encounter were at least as likely to have reached orgasm as men who adopted an insertive role. A study sampling single people in the U.S. indicated that orgasm rates are similar among men across sexual orientations. With regard to pain or being uncomfortable during anal sex, some research indicates that, for 24% to 61% of gay or bisexual men, painful receptive anal sex (known as anodyspareunia) is a frequent lifetime sexual difficulty.

Reports pertaining to the prevalence of anal sex among MSM have varied over time, with some percentages higher than others. A large percentage of gay and bisexual men self-report lifetime participation in anal sex. Studies among gay men have indicated that percentages are similar when comparing men who prefer to penetrate their partners to those who prefer to be the receptive partner. Some men who have sex with men, however, believe that being a receptive partner during anal sex questions their masculinity.

=== Frot ===
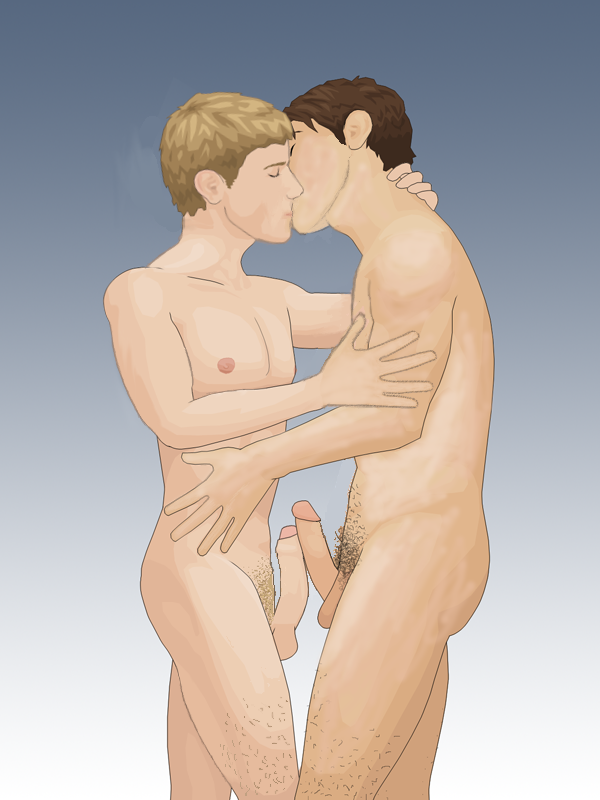
Two men engaged in frotting by rubbing their penises together

Frot is sexual activity between men based on penis-to-penis contact. Mutual and simultaneous stimulation of the genitals of both partners produces pleasurable friction against the frenulum nerve bundle, below the urinary opening (meatus) of the penis head (glans penis). Docking involves insertion of the glans penis into a partner's foreskin.

Frottage refers broadly to genital rubbing, non-penetrative sex, or outercourse. Such practices include intercrural sex, with the penis thrust between a partner's legs or thighs, also known as interfemoral sex. Using feet to stimulate a partner's penis is a footjob.

=== Sex toys ===
MSM may use sex toys. According to an online survey of 25,294 men who self-reported a homosexual or bisexual orientation, 49.8% have used vibrators. Most men who had used a vibrator in the past reported use during masturbation (86.2%). When used during partnered interactions, vibrators were incorporated into foreplay (65.9%) and intercourse (59.4%).

== Health risks ==
A variety of sexually transmitted infections (STIs) can be transmitted through sexual activity, including between men. Infections are more easily transmitted during receptive anal sex compared to other forms of sex.

== Legality ==
Some or all sexual acts between men are currently or were formerly classified as crimes in jurisdictions of some countries. In its December 2020 report, International Lesbian, Gay, Bisexual, Trans and Intersex Association (ILGA) found that certain sexual acts between men are criminalized in 67 of 193 UN member states and one non-independent jurisdiction, the Cook Islands, while two UN member states, Iraq and Egypt, criminalize it de facto but not in legislation. In Egypt, there is no law against homosexuality but gay and bisexual men are prosecuted under other laws, most famously the Cairo 52. In at least six UN member states—Brunei, Iran, Mauritania, Nigeria (only northern Nigeria), Saudi Arabia and Yemen—it is punishable by death. In 2007, five countries executed someone as a penalty for homosexual acts. In 2020, ILGA named Iran and Saudi Arabia as the only countries in which executions for same-sex activity have reportedly taken place. In other countries, such as Yemen and Iraq, extrajudicial executions are carried out by militias such as Islamic State or Al-Qaeda. Many other countries had such laws in the past, but they were repealed, especially since 1945. Such laws are inherently difficult to enforce; more often than not, they are not commonly enforced.

Criminalized Decriminalized 1791–1850 Decriminalized 1850–1945 Decriminalized 1946–1989 Decriminalized 1990–present Unknown date of legalization Always legal

== See also ==
- Gay pornography
- LGBTQ sex education
- Outline of LGBTQ topics
- Same-sex relationship
- Sexual practices between women
- Terminology of homosexuality

== Bibliography ==
- Steven Gregory Underwood(2003): Gay Men and Anal Eroticism Tops, Bottoms, and Versatiles. Harrington Park Press. 978-1-56023-375-6
- Ahmady, Kameel Et al 2020: Forbidden Tale (A comprehensive study on lesbian, gay, bisexuals (LGB) in Iran). AP Lambert Academic Publishing, Germany.
