= Conventional sex =

Conventional sex without fetish, kink or BDSM elements

Conventional sex, colloquially known as vanilla sex, is sexual behavior that is within the range of normality for a culture or subculture. What is regarded as conventional sex depends on cultural and subcultural norms. It can also describe penetrative sex which does not have any element of BDSM, kink or fetish.

== Conventional sexual acts in the Western world ==
Among heterosexual couples in the Western world, for example, conventional sex often refers to sexual intercourse in the missionary position.

The British Medical Journal regards conventional sex between homosexual couples as "sex that does not extend beyond affection, mutual masturbation, and oral and anal sex." In addition to mutual masturbation (including manual sex), penetrative sexual activity among same-sex pairings is contrasted by non-insertive acts such as intercrural sex, frot and tribadism, although tribadism has been cited as a common but rarely discussed sexual practice among lesbians.

== "Vanilla sex" ==
The term "vanilla sex" is often used to describe conventional sex which does not include explicit elements of BDSM, kink or fetishism.

In relationships where only one partner enjoys less conventional forms of sexual expression, the partner who does not enjoy such activities as much as the other is often referred to as the vanilla partner. As such, it is easy for them to be erroneously branded unadventurous in sexual matters. Through exploration with their partner, it may be possible for a more vanilla-minded person to discover new facets of their sexuality. As with any sexually active person, they may find their preferences on the commonly termed "vanilla-kink spectrum" are sufficient for their full satisfaction.

The term "vanilla" in "vanilla sex" leverages the polysemic nature of the term, meaning both literally "vanilla", the flavour of as the pod of the Vanilla genus or the orchid Vanilla planifolia, or "conventional", depending on the context.

Vanilla flavour has been the most common flavour for ice cream for over 200 years, leading to the flavor being associated with being plain, basic, or conventional. The figurative meaning was added in the 1970s, though earlier examples exist.

A notable early instance appears in a 1942 LIFE magazine article, suggesting the metaphorical use was already familiar to the public. In 1997, the OED expanded the definition to include sexual contexts, particularly "vanilla sex", referring to conventional, non-kinky activity. Several citations stem from 1970s gay and lesbian discourse, coinciding with a rise in visibility and activism, indicating cultural shifts shaped the modern usage.

== See also ==
- Plain vanilla
