= Frottage =

Frottage may refer to:

- Frottage, sexual rubbing; non-penetrative sex
  - Frot, male-on-male non-penetrative sex
  - Tribadism, female-on-female non-penetrative sex
- Frottage (art), technique

== See also ==
- Frotteurism, a paraphilia involving non-consensual sexual rubbing
