= Pussyjob =

Pussyjob is a slang word used to refer:

- Intercrural sex, when a person uses their labia majora to slide back and forth, rub, grind against their partner’s penis, to make them ejaculate without going inside the vagina, such as Sumata in Japan
- Tribadism or tribbing, commonly known by its scissoring position, is a lesbian sexual practice involving vulva-to-vulva contact or rubbing the vulva against the partner's thigh, especially for stimulation of the clitoris.
