= Ukusoma =

Zulu term for simulated intercourse (outercourse)

Ukusoma is the Zulu term for simulated intercourse (outercourse), also known as "thigh sex", in which a man is allowed to put his penis between the thighs of his partner, rather than in the vagina (or anus), with the woman's legs remaining crossed to prevent penetration. Another term for ukusoma is ukuhlobonga or ukumentsha, described in the 1861 dictionary by clergyman John Colenso. The practice has been widely reported across southern Africa by young couples.
