= Mundane =

Non-member of a particular group

In subcultural and fictional uses, a mundane is a person who does not belong to a particular group, according to the members of that group; the implication is that such persons, lacking imagination, are concerned solely with the mundane: the quotidian and ordinary. The term first came into use in science fiction fandom to refer, sometimes deprecatingly, to non-fans; this use of the term antedates 1955.

== Etymology ==
Mundane came originally from the Latin mundus, meaning ordinary and worldly as opposed to spiritual, and has been in use in English since the 15th century.

== In popular culture ==
Some Western cultural examples include:

- In Cassandra Clare's book series The Mortal Instruments and The Infernal Devices, humans who were not Shadowhunters nor Downworlders were referred to as "mundanes".
- In fantasy literature the term is sometimes used to apply to non-magical people or the non-magical society. It is used in Piers Anthony's Xanth novels and Bill Willingham's comic book series Fables (often shortened to "mundies" in the latter).
- In furry fandom, it is used to describe non-furries, or "humans".
- In historical reenactment groups such as the Society for Creative Anachronism (which originated in science fiction fandom):
  - 'Mundanes', sometimes shortened to just "'danes" (not to be confused with people of Danish descent), is also a term for normal everyday clothes, as opposed to those dressed in historical garb.
  - Similarly, one's "mundane" name is the legal name one goes by in the outside world.
  - Some participants classify all non-participants as "mundanes".
- In science fiction fandom, some fans classify all non-fans as "mundanes."
- In text-based online role-playing games, the term is commonly used to refer to the player as opposed to their character, typically shortened to "mun".
- In the science fiction television series Babylon 5, telepathic humans (especially Psi Corps members) classify all non-telepathic humans as "mundanes". The classification is employed mainly, but not solely, by telepathic characters who have telepath-supremacist ideologies (such ideologies being one of the issues dealt with by the series), and was deliberately chosen to mirror the classification in science fiction fandom.
- In the scope of the software communities of free and open-source software some proponents of the respective movements classify those that do not know enough about their views as "mundanes".
- In the vampire lifestyle circles the word "mundane" means "non-sanguinarian", although some consider it derogatory.
- Mundane science fiction is science fiction that does not make use of interstellar travel or other common tropes of the genre.

== See also ==
- Muggle
- Plain vanilla
- Populism
- Reactionary
- Reform movement
- Revival movement
- Underground culture
