= Anton Ziegler =

Austrian writer and artist (1793–1869)

Anton Ziegler (1793 – 17 February 1869) was an Austrian writer and artist.

== Biography ==
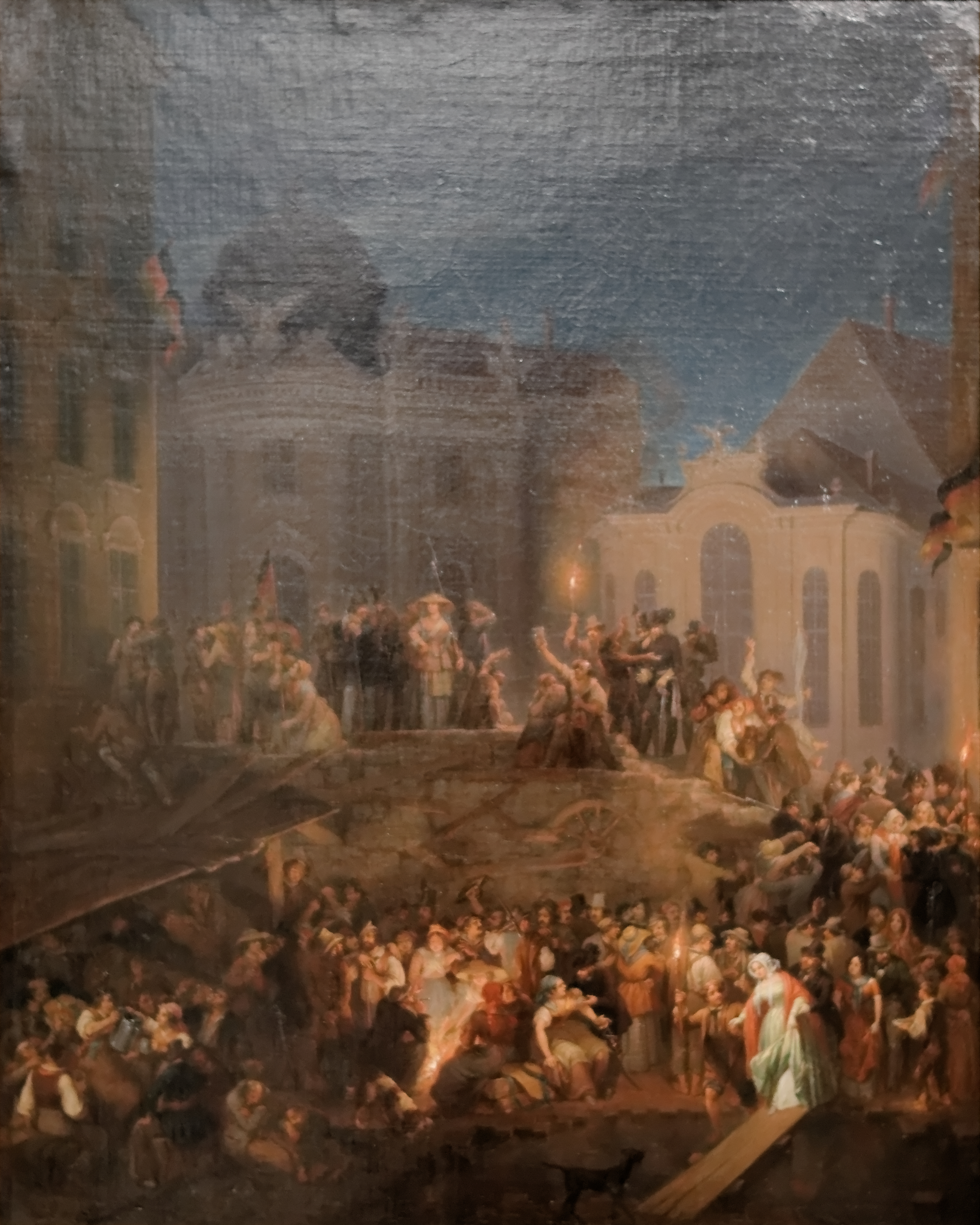
Die Barrikade auf dem Michaelerplatz - Anton Ziegler, 1848

Ziegler was born in Vienna in 1793. Nothing is known about his education and life. During the Revolutions of 1848 in the Austrian Empire, Ziegler was a member of the Vienna National Guard (German: Wiener Nationalgarde) in the Wieden district.

Ziegler began writing at an early age, and a number of works, some of which went through repeated editions, soon made his name known in wider circles. They were known for their artistic value, as Ziegler collaborated with artists such as Peter Johann Nepomuk Geiger.

In April 1848, Ziegler published the first issue of a popular journal entitled: Das große freie Oesterreich. Ein Volksblatt zur Belehrung und unparteiischen Mittheilung aller politischen Begebenheiten im In-und Auslande (English: The Great Free Austria. A People's Paper for the Instruction and Impartial Communication of All Political Events at Home and Abroad) and he himself was named as the editor-in-chief. However, it died out after the fourth issue. The Biographisches Lexikon des Kaiserthums Oesterreich states that this literary failure of Ziegler "characterizes the man quite clearly".

Ziegler went on to self-publish a litany of works. They were not available in bookshops, as they were only printed in a limited number of copies for a certain number of buyers, and Ziegler personally peddled them to get them to people.

Ziegler did not become rich with his publishing house, and he died at an old age on 17 February 1869 in Vienna.

== Poster controversy ==
In June 1848, Ziegler became infamous through a poster which he addressed to the members of the Academic Legion. In the poster, he reports the murder of his 23-year-old son Anton, a member of the Academic Legion. The poster provocatively reported that the son was on an art trip to Prague "on Whit Monday, June 12, 1848, with the German ribbon on his chest and dressed in the Viennese Academic uniform, murderously shot out of the window by a Czech and lies next to countless German brothers in his blood on the streets of Prague."

The story was patently false, as reported by Anton Beck in the Presse 1848, No. 12 in the article: "Ein Opfer der blutgierigen Czechen" (English: "A victim of the bloodthirsty Czechs"). In fact, soon after the poster appeared, Ziegler's son was seen in the streets and coffee houses of Vienna. Anton Ziegler, the father, did not take down the poster.

Ziegler did report his son as missing that October, while he was serving as an officer in the Vienna Mobile Guard (German: Wiener Mobilgarde). History is silent on whether he was found again.

== Publications ==
All of the below-mentioned works appear to have been self-published by Ziegler.

- "Bildliche Darstellung der Evangelien auf alle Sonn- und Feiertage in zwei Bänden mit 120 Bilderbeilagen"
- "Galerie aus der österreichischen Vaterlandsgeschichte in 3 Bänden, mit 147 Bilderbeilagen"
- "Vaterländische Immortellen aus dem Gebiete der österreichischen Geschichte.... in 4 Bänden mit 192 Bilderbeilagen“ Wien 1838, 4°.)
- "Memorabilien des In- und Auslandes für anziehende Weltbegebenheiten u. s. w., aus mehreren Jahrhunderten gesammelt und mit Federzeichnungen von dem k. k. Professor Peter Joh. Nep. Geiger ausgestattet in einem Bande mit 96 Bilderbeilagen"
- "Vaterländische Bilderchronik aus der Geschichte des österreichischen Kaiserstaates von seinen ältesten Bewohnern bis auf die gegenwärtige Zeit in 3 Bänden mit 270 Bilderbeilagen" (Wien 1848, 4°.)
- "Bilderchronik in einer neuen Folge mit den neuesten Zeitereignissen in den Nachbarstaaten in 4 Bänden mit 152 Bilderbeilagen"
- "Der vaterländische Pilger im In- und Auslande für anziehende geschichtliche Ereignisse, in einem Bande mit 33 Bilderbeilagen"
- "Geschichte des k. k. Militärs aus allen Waffengattungen von der frühesten Zeit bis zur Gegenwart, in einem Bande mit 60 Bilderbeilagen"
- "Stammtableau des allerdurchlauchtigsten Kaiserhauses Habsburg-Lothringen, mit ausführlicher Erklärung"
- "Wiener Häuser-Schema sammt den nächsten Umgebungen, in k. k. Polizeibezirksgrundrisse eingetheilt, mit 15 Grundrissen, nach der neuesten Häusernumerirung in zwei Abtheilungen nach den Vorstädten und Gemeinden colorirt"
- "Die Kirchen, Klöster, Capellen und Bethäuser Wiens und der nächsten Umgebung"
