= Bundling (tradition) =

Courting behavior

Bundling, or tarrying, is the traditional practice of wrapping a couple together in a bed, sometimes with a board between the two of them, usually as a part of courting behavior. The tradition is thought to have originated either in the Netherlands or in the British Isles and later became common in colonial United States, especially in Pennsylvania Dutch Country. Bundling is associated with the Amish as a form of courtship.

== Courtship practice ==
Bundling, or "bed courting", is believed to have originated in the pre-Celtic populations of the British Isles and was introduced to the American colonies by European settlers (primarily Dutch and Welsh) where it attained unprecedented popularity. Traditionally, the practice of courtship involved two young adults or adolescents, often betrothed, who spent the night in bed together under the parental roof to ensure compatibility and accountability. A bundling board or bundling sack may make an appearance, as it takes the form of a contraceptive for a bundling couple. A bundling board was a large plank that was placed in between the couple and the bundling sack was a sleeping bag that was sewn up the middle. Periods of popularity for the practice of bundling often align with eras of enhanced social position for women, as this custom afforded a high level of protection against premarital sex.

The custom of bundling, which became common in New England in the eighteenth century, was used to certify that an unwed father was held accountable for an illegitimate pregnancy. The courtship practice would ensure that there would be witnesses to certify any intimacy that took place. Within the seventeenth century, courts were more willing to accept a woman's testimony that a specific man had fathered her child. Stricter standards came about in the eighteenth century when the court officials wanted evidence in support of the woman's allegation, which could be difficult to obtain. If a couple had sex in secret and the woman became pregnant, no witness of the relation would have taken place. Marriage by a spousal contract or in a church would often follow bundling.

== In the United States ==
Two forms of bundling in colonial America are generally discussed: a sleeping arrangement between strangers, or the bed-sharing of lovers under parental supervision. The former definition refers to the practice used to accommodate the heavy traffic of travelers in the underdeveloped colonies, often with no implication of sexual activity. The latter, however, refers to the courtship practice which ensured legal accountability for an unwed father in the case of pre-marital pregnancy. The courtship ritual of bundling was primarily observed in rural communities. The measure of familial and community protection which bundling provided against the scandal of abandonment was not offered in urban settings where populations had a much higher degree of mobility and anonymity.

Despite some religious criticism, bundling rose in popularity amongst rural populations throughout the eighteenth century. The prevalence of premarital sex in colonial America is shown by the rate of legitimate births within the first nine months of marriage; the late eighteenth century observed a remarkable increase in pre-marital pregnancies, with 30-40% of infants born within the first nine months of marriage. A high correlation is observed between the pre-marital pregnancy status of mothers and daughters in the 18th century.

In Colonial United States, Jonathan Edwards and other preachers condemned bundling. American Puritanism condemned the practice of bundling as immoral, or un-Christian. The heyday of bundling in the late 18th century corresponds to a period of low engagement with puritanical ideals, when religious participation for adolescents was not strictly enforced by societal standards. With the Second Great Awakening at the turn of the 19th century, religion became a much larger part of adolescent life and puritanical morals were more heavily enforced by a larger societal group. As social opinion moved away from the practical solution of bundling to the ideological solution of abstinence and moral responsibility, the popularity of bundling waned.

It is possible that, as late as the mid-19th century, bundling was still practiced in New York state and perhaps in New England, though its popularity was waning. The court case of Graham v. Smith, 1 Edm.Sel.Cas. 267 (N.Y. 1846), for example, initially argued before Judge Edmunds in the Orange Circuit Court of New York, concerned the seduction of a 19-year-old woman; testimony in the case established that bundling was a common practice in certain rural social circles at the time. By the 20th century, bundling seems to have disappeared almost everywhere, except for the more conservative Old Order Amish affiliations, where it was still in use as of 2006, regardless of location. In the modern United States, practices of "dating" and "necking" might be tied to the previous practice of bundling. Public widespread anxiety about the vulnerability of young women led to new writing which was published in newspapers and magazines during the eighteenth century.

== In Africa ==
The Kwanyama are one of the eight Ambo Bantu tribes that live in Southwest Africa. The courtship practice of bundling is popular amongst the Kwanyama. This practice began within the Kwanyama Ambo tribe during the eighteenth century. Bundling for the Kwanyama does not imply sexual intercourse, but rather the word bundling is okunangala, which means "to sleep together." In South Africa, bundling prevented the birth of illegitimate children. Kwanyama engaged couples bundle under supervision, but illegitimate bundling occurs at night during public gatherings—meaning no witness is present.

== In Europe ==
Bundling had been reported across the Germanic tribes, the Celts, the Finns and people of the Baltic states. The German-Swiss custom of Kiltgang demonstrates the practice of boys and girls who were at puberty age spending the night in bed together. This practice began in the nineteenth century in Norway and Sweden. The participants were either entirely or partially clothed, and sexual intercourse would not occur. The youth were enabled to choose a mate without the interference of their parents.

In the seventeenth century, some Jewish societies encouraged affection before marriage. This sometimes led to courtship practices that included some sexual contact short of intercourse. This suggests similarities to bundling practices in early modern France and North America. Seventeenth-century moralist Isaiah Horowitz denounced this practice, as he was concerned with the sexual transgressions that may occur from romantic affection before the wedding. In the eighteenth century, another moralist Ezekiel Landau reported a case where "Jewish bundling" led to intercourse.

== Literature ==
The writer Washington Irving, in book 3, chapter 7 of A History of New York (1809) as well as other of his works, refers to bundling as a Yankee practice.

This amazing increase may, indeed, be partly ascribed to a singular custom prevalent among them, commonly known by the name of bundling—a superstitious rite observed by the young people of both sexes, with which they usually terminated their festivities, and which was kept up with religious strictness by the more bigoted part of the community.

Historian Edward Shorter wrote in The Making of the Modern Family that the widespread increase of illegitimate births through courtship practices comprised a "sexual revolution" that was issued by the rise of industrial capitalism within the eighteenth century.

Jakob Huizinga, a Mennonite reverend who remained on the island of Texel (northwestern part of The Netherlands) from 1844 to 1881 wrote about unlawful premarital sexuality in his diary. Huizinga referred to the "Texel custom" or "night courting" practice that consisted of potential suitors entering an unmarried woman's bedroom at night. Night courting, bundling, or festerln was organized in areas bordering the North Sea as well as the Alps and Baltic region.

== See also ==
- Non-penetrative sex

== Sources ==
- Shachtman, Tom. Rumspringa: To Be or Not to Be Amish. New York: North Point Press (Farrar, Straus and Giroux), 2006.
- Ekrich, Roger A. At Day's Close: Night in Times Past. Chapter 7, 2005.
- Walsh, William S.: Handy Book of Curious Information. J. B. Lippincott Company, 1913
- Little Known Facts about Bundling in the New World by Ammon Monroe Aurand Jr (1895–1956)
