= Vanilla software =

Software not customized from their original form

Vanilla software refers to applications and systems used in their unmodified, original state, as distributed by their vendors. This term is often applied in fields such as enterprise resource planning (ERP), e-government systems, and software development, where simplicity and adherence to vendor standards are more important than expanded functionality. By opting for vanilla software, organizations benefit from lower costs and straightforward maintenance, though the trade-off may include reduced flexibility and customization options.

In these contexts, it emphasizes simplicity, standardization, and ease of maintenance.

== Origin ==
The term vanilla is derived from the plain, unadorned flavor of vanilla ice cream, a connotation that dates back to its popularity as a universal base in desserts. Within computing, the term emerged as early as the 1980s, popularized in systems and user interfaces to describe default or base states. For example, IBM's BookMaster system referred to its simplest configuration as "vanilla" and its more complex counterpart as "mocha" to signify additional features.

Eric S. Raymond's Jargon File, an influential glossary of hacker slang, defines "vanilla" in this context by associating it with "ordinary" or "standard" states, as distinct from the default setting. The use of the term expanded in the 1990s, encompassing Unix systems, where a "vanilla kernel" signified an unmodified kernel directly from the original source. Video-game culture also embraced the terminology, describing unmodified games without add-ons or user-created mods as "vanilla versions".

== Applications ==
=== Enterprise resource planning ===
Vanilla ERP systems are frequently deployed to standardize business processes across organizations, minimizing risks associated with customization. While vanilla implementations align closely with vendor-provided best practices, they may limit flexibility, posing a so-called common system paradox.

=== E-government systems ===
Vanilla software is integral to e-government initiatives, supporting data interoperability across agencies. However, while such systems facilitate standardization, studies have highlighted challenges in tailoring these solutions to meet unique institutional needs.

=== Software development practices ===
In programming, vanilla describes frameworks and tools used without extensions or alterations, which can simplify coding processes and enhance maintainability.

== Examples ==
- A PC with clear version of Microsoft Windows installed, without bundled software
- Android One plan

== Advantages and disadvantages ==
Using software without modification as released by its developers is commonplace and is often the default for users lacking the technical skills required to change the software. An advantage of vanilla software, if it is well-maintained by its developers, is that it is virtually guaranteed to receive regular updates, which can be critical security patches. As a result, forking off a new version may disconnect it from further updates, or make the integration of those updates more difficult.

Business and enterprise settings often require the use of vanilla software as-is due to copyright and licensing agreements, which may forbid modification and tampering, such as Microsoft Windows or Access. A disadvantage, this situation creates a captive audience for some software. As a result, an individual or organization becomes reliant on the third-party's maintenance of the software and its related services, which can result in suboptimal performance, cause privacy issues, and become prone to planned obsolescence..

== See also ==
- Commercial off-the-shelf
- Out of the box (feature)
- Plain vanilla
- Turnkey
- Video game modding
