= Handjob =

Manual stimulation of a penis by a sex partner

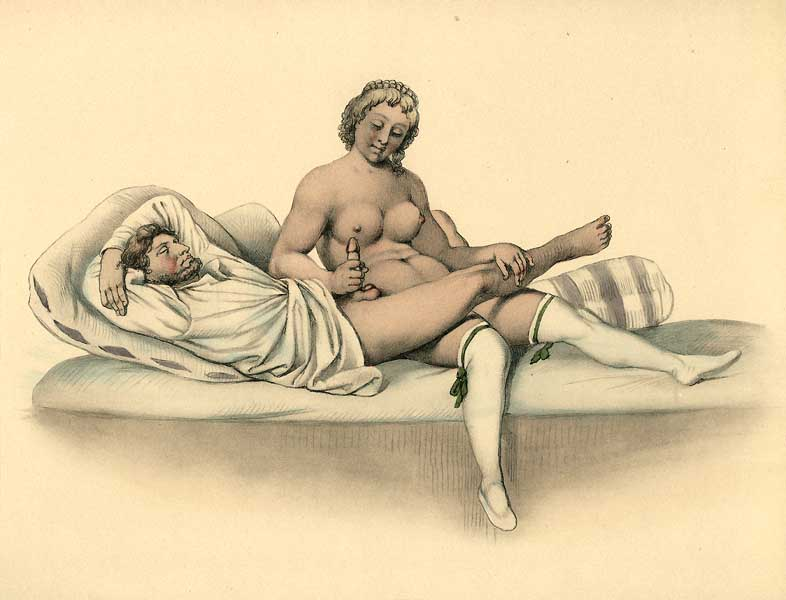
Johann Nepomuk Geiger, erotic watercolor, 1840. A woman giving a man a handjob

A handjob (also spelled hand job) is a manual sex act involving a person stimulating the penis or scrotum of another by using the hand. This is done to induce an erection for sexual pleasure, sexual arousal and may result in orgasm and ejaculation.

A handjob can be performed as either foreplay or as non-penetrative sex. It is analogous to fingering (manual stimulation of the vulva or vagina).

Someone may give a handjob so as not to engage in penetrative sexual activity. Besides avoiding the risks associated with sexual penetration, such as sexually transmitted infections (STIs) or pregnancy from unprotected penile-vaginal sex, some people engage in non-penetrative sex to preserve virginity.

== Practice ==
=== General ===
The main aspect of a handjob is manual stimulation of the penis by stroking with the hand, rubbing with the fingers, or some combination. One common technique is to move the hand (or both hands) up and down on the shaft, glans, and frenulum. The movements and speed of the action may vary. Personal lubricants are often used.

Others may also use their hands and fingers to stimulate the scrotum by rubbing, stroking, pulling, or even manipulating the testicles.

== Prevalence in massage parlors ==
In some massage parlors, a masseuse, whether as part of the massage itself or directly after it, may perform a handjob on their customer. This is sometimes known by the euphemism "happy ending".

An investigation by Time Out New York in January 2011 found many New York City massage parlors advertising "sensual massage" and providing handjobs. The parlors charged from $60 to $160, with an extra tip for the sex workers (usually $40) for a massage and manual "happy ending". Most of the massage parlors reviewed were "rub and tug joints" where handjobs were the only sexual services provided, and there was a strict policy of the male clients not touching the workers.

== See also ==
- Fellatio
- Footjob
- Hand fetishism
- Jerking off/wanking – manual stimulation of one's own penis as a form of masturbation
- Mutual masturbation - the sex act of two or more people either simultaneously masturbating or performing mutual sex on each other
