= Plain vanilla =

Expression and metaphor

Plain vanilla is an adjective describing the simplest version of something without any optional extras, basic or ordinary, in analogy with the common ice cream flavour vanilla, which became widely and cheaply available with the development of artificial vanillin flavour. (There is also plain ice cream without vanilla or any other flavouring, but vanilla has come to be considered basic.)

Certain financial instruments, such as put or call options, are often termed plain vanilla options, as opposed to exotic options.

== See also ==
- Vanilla software, computer software which is not customized.
- Vanilla sex, sexual behavior which a culture regards as standard or conventional.
