= Peter Johann Nepomuk Geiger =

Austrian artist (1805–1880)

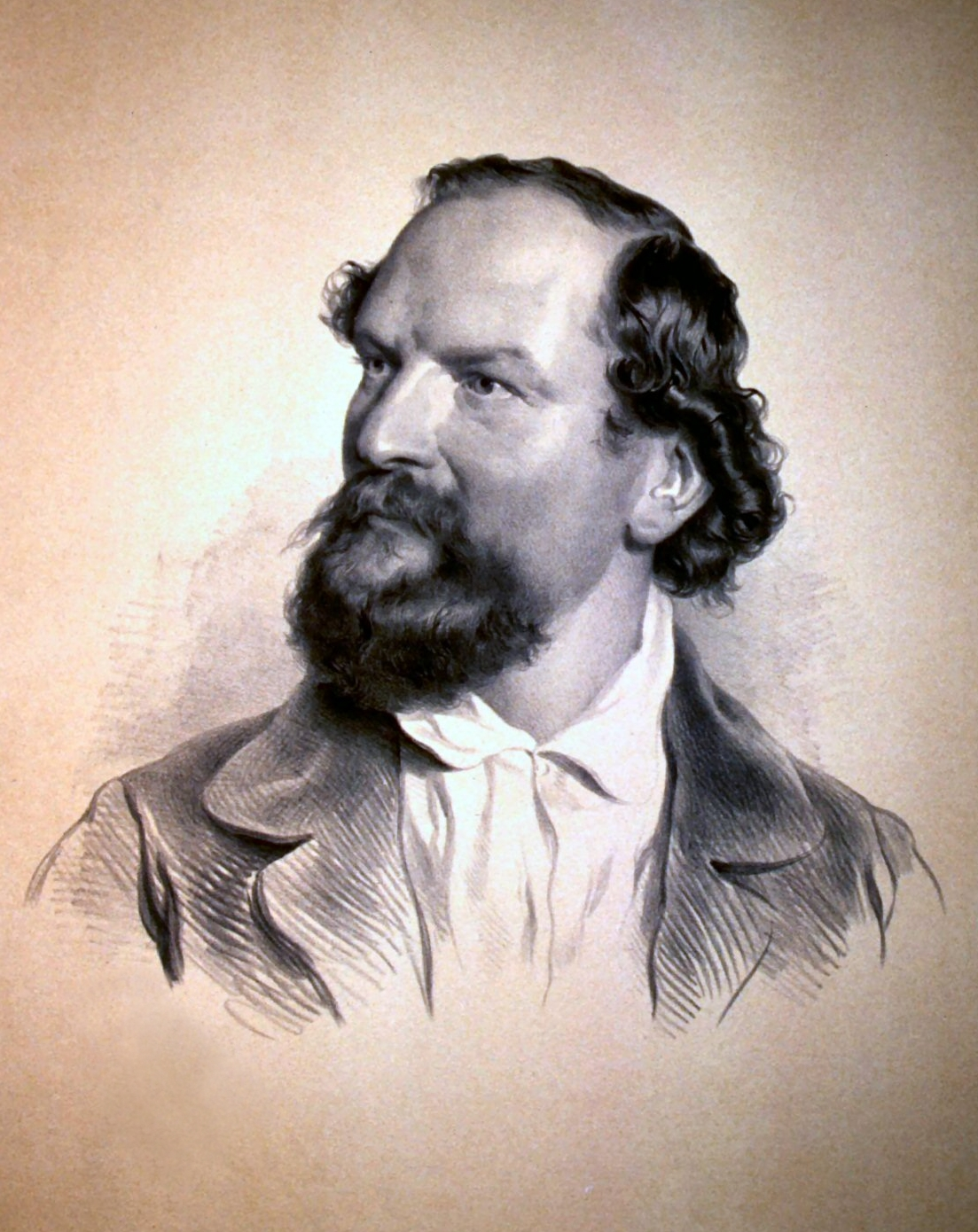
- 1852 lithograph
- Born: 11 January 1805; Vienna, Austrian Empire
- Died: 29 October 1880 (aged 75); Vienna, Austria-Hungary

Peter Johann Nepomuk Geiger (11 January 1805 – 29 October 1880) was a Viennese artist.

== Life ==
Born in Vienna, Geiger wanted originally to follow the family tradition and become a sculptor, but drawing and painting were his natural element. He illustrated Anton Ziegler's Vaterländischen Immortellen (transl. Immortals of the Native Land) of 1839–40. Until 1848, he carried out numerous illustrations of historical works and poetry, but also made oil paintings for the Austrian Royal Family.

Returning from a journey to the Orient with Prince Ferdinand Maximilian Joseph in 1850, he entered a particularly creative period. In 1853, he became Professor of the Viennese Academy of Art. For the Royal Family, he made many works including illustrations of Goethe, Friedrich Schiller, and William Shakespeare. He also illustrated oriental life.

His erotic drawings are particularly remembered.

== Selected works ==
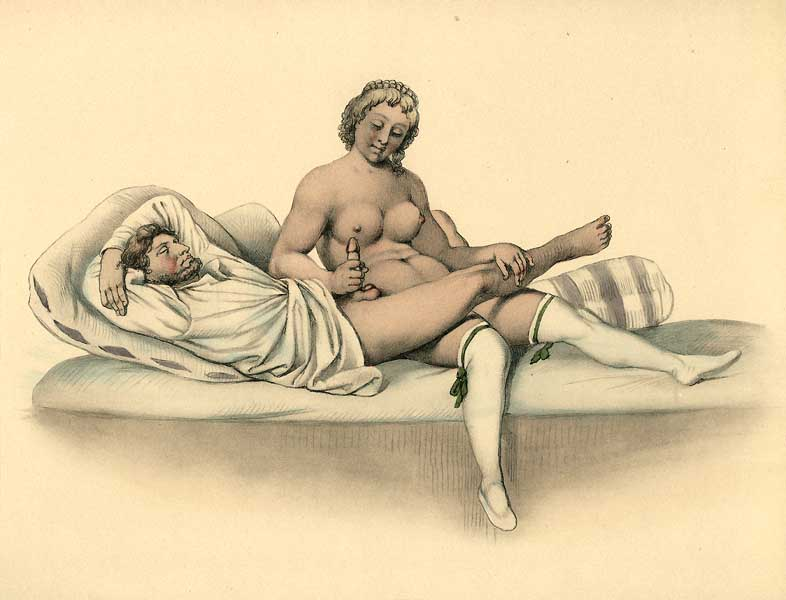
1840 erotic watercolor

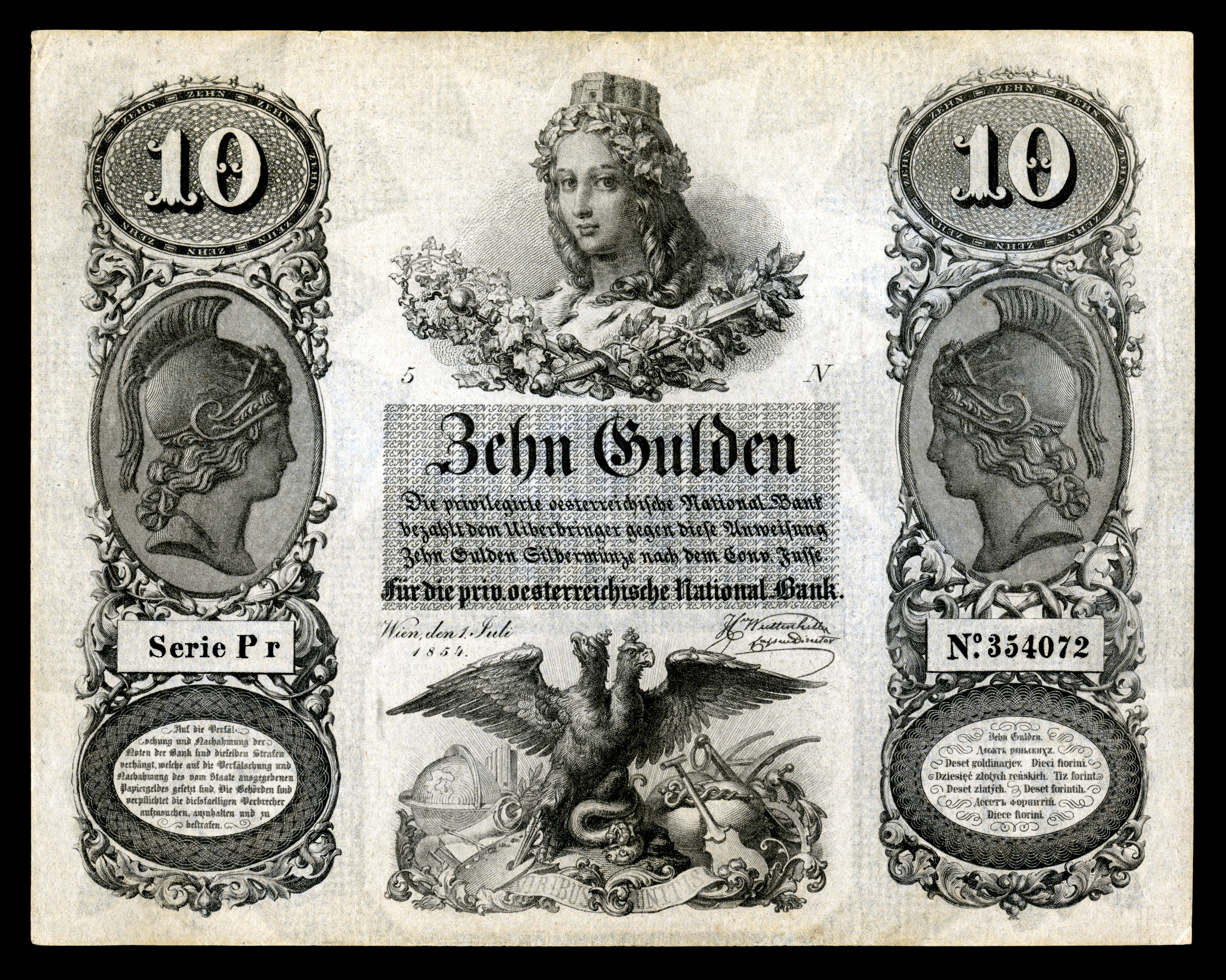
Austrian 10 Gulden note (1854) designed by Geiger.

- 1839: Ziegler, Anton. Vaterländischen Immortellen aus dem Gebiete der österreichischen Geschichte. 4 vols. Wien, 1840, 1839.
- 1843: Magyar-és Erdélyország története rajzolatokban: Geschichte Ungarn's und Siebenbürgen's in Abbildungen ...; Geiger Péter N. János akadémiai képirótól; tervezte és magyar 's német nyelven magyarázta Wenzel Gusztáv. 10 vols. Wien, 1843
- Joseph von Bülow's Memorabilien aus der Europäischen Geschichte für anziehende Weltbegebenheiten, ausgezeichnete Grossthaten, Würdigung der Verdienste von berühmten Männern etc. Aus mehreren Jahrhunderte gesammelt. Mit insgesamt 96 getönten Federlithographien von Johann Nepomuk Geiger auf Tafeln. 2 vols. New York, 1860
- 1861: Historische Handzeichnungen; mit erklärendem Texte von Gustav Adolph Schimmer; mit neunzig Tafeln. Wien: Aus der kaiserlich-königlichen Hof- und Staatsdruckerei, 1861
- Die Schlacht bei Lützen (The battle of Lutzen)
- Kampf der Tiroler unter Andreas Hofer (The struggle of the Tyrolese under Andreas Hofer)

== See also ==
- List of Austrian artists and architects

== Sources ==
- Wiesboeck, Karl L. (1868) Peter J. N. Geiger's Werke; oder, Verzeichniss saemmtlicher Radirungen, lithographischen Feder- und Kreidezeichnungen .... Leipzig: Weigel
- Geiger Peter Johann Nepomuk in Constant von Wurzbach. Vol. 5. Wien: Biographisches Lexikon des Kaiserthums Oesterreich (Online version). 1859.
