= Frot =

Penis-to-penis sexual contact

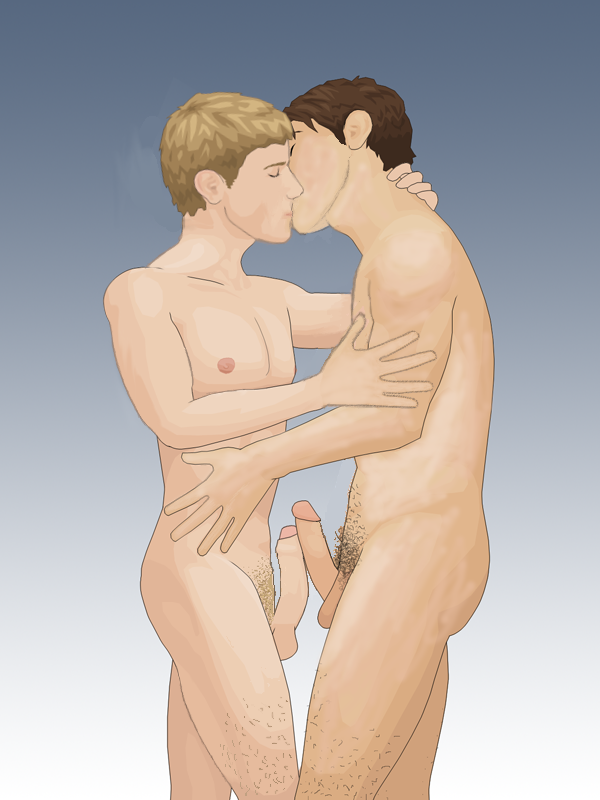
Two men rubbing their penises together

Frot or frotting (slang for frottage; from French frotter 'to rub') is a sexual practice that usually involves direct penis-to-penis contact. The term was popularized by gay male activists who disparaged or disliked the practice of anal sex, but has since spread in usage to others who may not share those attitudes. It can also be used as a type of foreplay.

Because it is not penetrative, frotting has the safe sex benefit of reducing the risk of transmitting HIV/AIDS; however, it still carries the risk of skin-to-skin sexually transmitted infections, such as HPV and pubic lice (crabs), both of which can be transmitted even when lesions are not visible.

It is analogous to tribadism, which is vulva-to-vulva contact.

== Concept and etymology ==
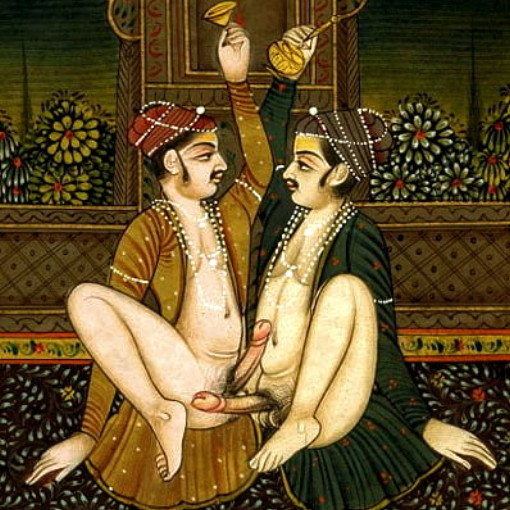
Mughal art depicting two frotting men

The modern definition of frotting emerged in a context of a debate about the status of anal sex within the gay male community; some in the anti-anal, pro-frotting camp insist that anal sex ought to be avoided altogether. One view argued that the popularity of anal sex would decline, presumably with a corresponding drop in HIV rates, if gay men could somehow be persuaded to stop thinking of anal sex as a "vanilla" practice, but rather as something "kinky" and not-quite-respectable—as was the case in the 1950s and 1960s, when gay men who preferred to do only mutual masturbation and fellatio sometimes used the disparaging slang term brownie queen for aficionados of anal sex.

Gay activist Bill Weintraub began to heavily promote and recommend the genital-specific meaning of "penis-to-penis rubbing" as frotting on Internet forums sometime in the late 1990s, and said he coined the term. "I don't use the word 'frottage,' because it is an ersatz French word which can indicate any sort of erotic rubbing," he stated. "Frot, by contrast, is always phallus-to-phallus sex." Weintraub believes that is what actual sex is; genital-genital contact.

Alternative terms for frotting include frictation, which can refer to the wider meaning of frottage but also penis-penis sex specifically, as well as sword-fighting, Oxford style, Princeton rub, and Ivy League rub.

== Sexual practices ==
=== General ===
Frotting can be enjoyable because it mutually and simultaneously stimulates the genitals of both partners as it tends to produce pleasurable friction against the frenulum nerve bundle on the underside of each partner's penile shaft, just below the urinary opening (meatus) of the penis head (glans penis).

=== Safer sex ===
Since frotting is a non-penetrative sex act, the risk of passing a sexually transmitted infection (STI) that requires direct contact between the mucous membranes and pre-ejaculate or semen is reduced. HIV is among the infections that require such direct contact, and research indicates that there is no risk of HIV transmission via frotting. However, frotting can still transmit other sexually transmitted infections, such as HPV (which can cause genital warts) and pubic lice (crabs). Vaccines are available against HPV.

=== Comparison with anal sex and debates ===
Some gay men, or men who have sex with men (MSM) in general, prefer to engage in frotting or other forms of mutual masturbation because they find it more pleasurable or more affectionate than anal sex, to preserve technical virginity, or as safe sex alternatives to anal penetration. This preference has led to some debate in the gay male and MSM community regarding what constitutes "real sex" or the most sensual expression of sexual intimacy. Some frotting advocates consider "two genitals coming together by mingling, caressing, sliding" and rubbing to be sex more than other forms of male sexual activity. Other men who have sex with men associate male masculinity with the sexual positions of "tops" and "bottoms" during anal sex.

During anal sex, the insertive partner may be referred to as the top or active partner. The one being penetrated may be referred to as the bottom or passive partner. Those with no strong preference for either are referred to as versatile. Some frotting advocates insist that such roles introduce inequality during sexual intimacy, and that frotting is "equal" because of mutual genital-genital stimulation. The lack of mutual genital stimulation and role asymmetry has led other frotting advocates to denounce anal sex as degrading to the receptive partner. This view of dominance and inequality associated with sex roles is disputed by researchers who state that it is not clear that specific sexual acts are necessarily indicative of general patterns of masculinity or dominance in a gay male relationship, and that, for both partners, anal intercourse can be associated with being masculine. Additionally, some frotting advocates, such as Bill Weintraub, are concerned with diseases that may be acquired through anal sex. In a 2005 article in The Advocate, one anal sex opponent said that no longer showing anal sex as erotic would help avoid HIV/AIDS, and opined that some gay men perceived him to be anti-gay when he was only trying to keep gay and bisexual men alive and healthy.

Gay men, and MSM in general, who prefer anal sex may view it as "[their] version of intercourse" and as "the natural apex of sex, a wonderful expression of intimacy, and a great source of pleasure." Psychologist Walt Odets said, "I think that anal sex has for gay men the same emotional significance that vaginal sex has for heterosexuals." Anal sex is generally viewed as vanilla sex among MSM, and is often thought to be expected, even by MSM who do not prefer the act. "Some people like [anal] because it seems taboo or naughty," stated author and sex therapist Jack Morin. "Some people like the flavor of dominance and submission... some don't."

MSM who defend the essential validity of anal sex have rejected claims made by radical frotting advocates. Others have at times disparaged frottage as a makeshift, second-rate form of male/male intimacy—something better left to inexperienced teenagers and "closeted" older men. Odets said, "No one would propose that we initiate a public health measure by de-eroticizing vaginal sex. It would sound like a ridiculous idea. It's no less ridiculous for gay men."

HuffPost contributor and sexologist Joe Kort proposed the term side for gay men who are not interested in anal sex and instead prefer "to kiss, hug and engage in oral sex, rimming, mutual masturbation and rubbing up and down on each other," viewing "sides" as simply another gay male sexual preference akin to being a top, bottom or versatile, and adding that "Whether a man enjoys anal sex or not is no reflection on his sexual orientation, and if he's gay, it doesn't define whether or not he's 'really' having sex."

== Prevalence ==
A 2011 survey of gay and bisexual men by the Journal of Sexual Medicine found that out of over 1,300 different combinations of sexual acts practiced, the most common, at 16% of all encounters, was "holding their partner romantically, kissing partner on mouth, solo-masturbation, masturbating partner, masturbation by partner, and genital–genital contact."

== Among other animals ==
Genital–genital rubbing has been observed between males of other animals as well. Among bonobos, frottage frequently occurs when two males hang from a tree limb and engage in penis fencing; it also occurs while two males are in the missionary position.

Genital rubbing similar to frotting between non-primate males has been observed among bull manatees, in conjunction with "kissing". When engaging in genital–genital rubbing, male bottlenose dolphins often penetrate the genital slit or, less commonly, the anus. Penis-to-penis rubbing is also common among homosexually active mammals.

== See also ==
- Intercrural sex
- Sex position
