= Non-penetrative sex =

Sexual activity that usually excludes penetration

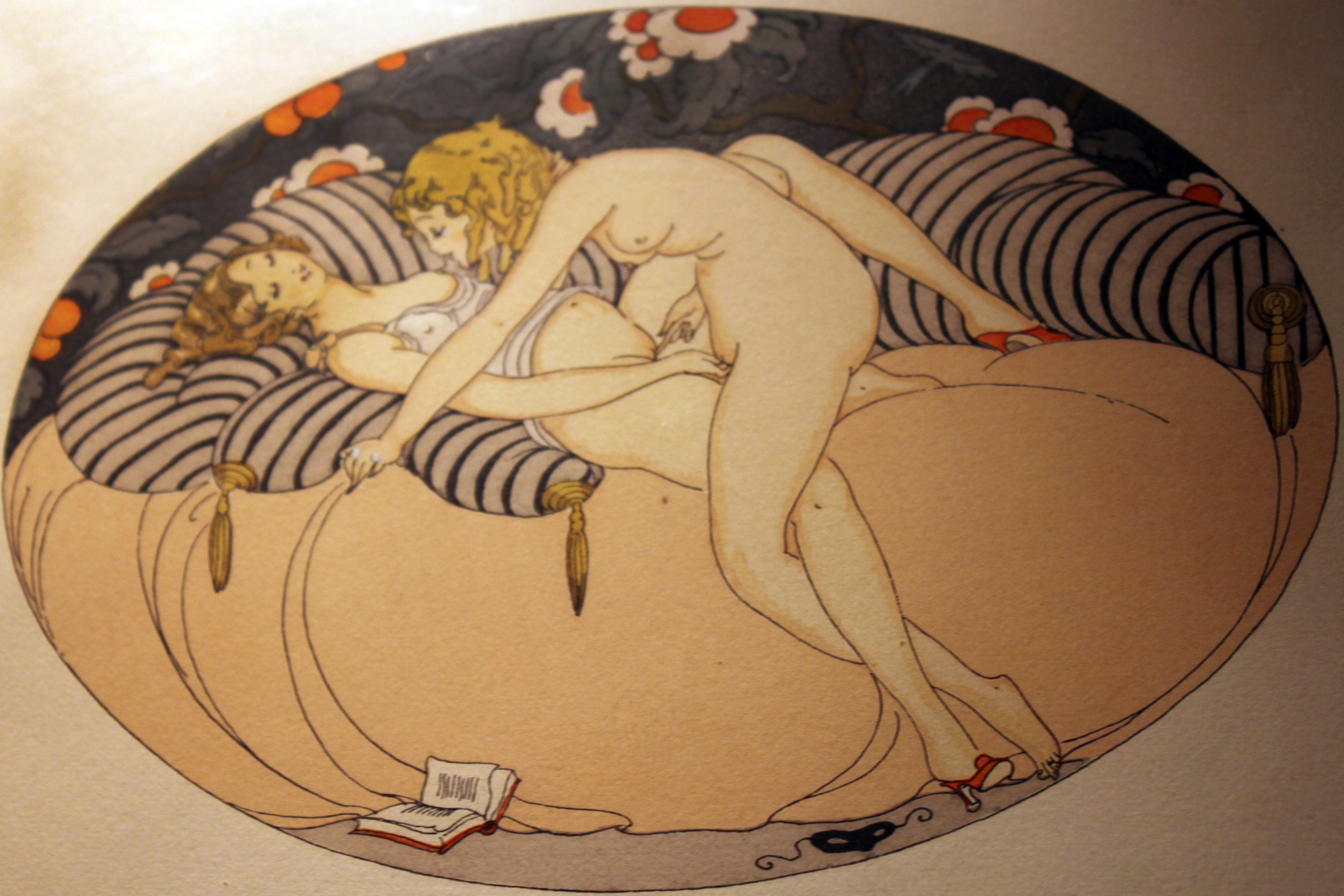
A 1925 illustration by Gerda Wegener depicting two women fingering each other in bed

Non-penetrative sex or outercourse is sexual activity that usually does not include sexual penetration, but some forms, particularly when termed outercourse, include penetrative aspects, that may result from forms of fingering or oral sex. It generally excludes the penetrative aspects of vaginal, anal, or oral sex, but includes various forms of sexual and non-sexual activity, such as frottage, manual sex, mutual masturbation, kissing, or hugging.

People engage in non-penetrative sex for a variety of reasons, including as a form of foreplay or as a primary or preferred sexual act. Heterosexual couples may engage in non-penetrative sex as an alternative to penile-vaginal penetration, to preserve virginity, or as a type of birth control. Same-sex couples may also engage in non-penetrative sex to preserve virginity, with gay males using it as an alternative to anal penetration.

Although sexually transmitted infections (STIs) such as herpes, HPV, and pubic lice can be transmitted through non-penetrative genital-genital or genital-body sexual activity, non-penetrative sex may be used as a form of safer sex because it is less likely that body fluids (the main source of STI transmission) will be exchanged during the activities, especially with regard to aspects that are exclusively non-penetrative.

== Definitions and practices ==
=== General ===
While non-penetrative sex (or outercourse) is usually defined as excluding sexual penetration, some non-penetrative sex acts can have both non-penetrative and penetrative components and may therefore still be categorized as non-penetrative sex. Oral sex, for example, which can include oral caress of the genitalia, as well as penile penetration of the mouth or oral penetration of the vagina, may be categorized as non-penetrative sex. Oral sex may also be considered outercourse solely because it is not vaginal or anal intercourse.

The words penetration and penetrative may be restricted to penile-vaginal penetration, and, in this way, the definition of outercourse additionally includes penetrative anal sex, with the term outercourse used to contrast the term sexual intercourse as vaginal sex. Definitions restricting the terms non-penetrative sex and outercourse to whether penile penetration has occurred, or to non-penetrative sexual acts that do not involve exchanges of potentially infectious body fluids, also exist.

The term heavy petting covers a broad range of foreplay activities, typically involving some genital stimulation, but not the direct act of penetrative sexual intercourse.

=== Frottage ===
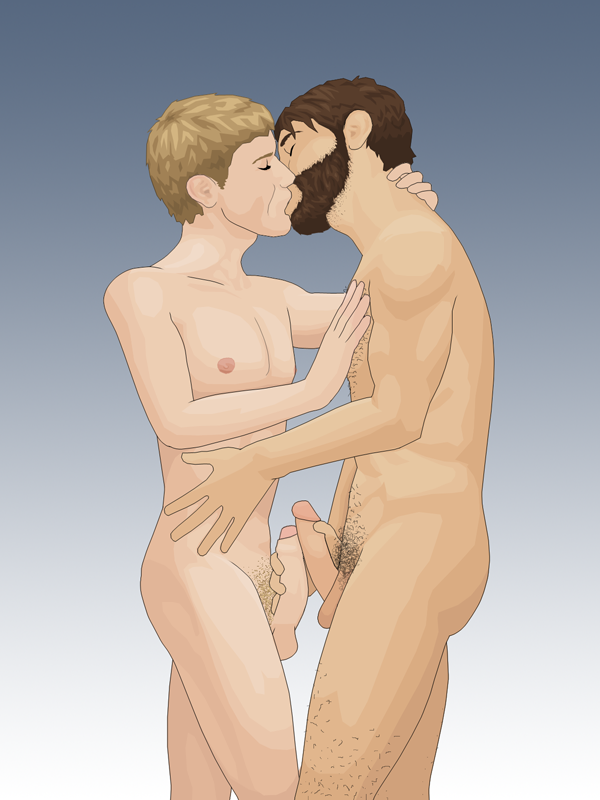
Frot: two men rubbing their penises together to create sexual sensations

Frottage is the general term for the act of rubbing any part of the body, including the buttocks, the breasts, abdomen, thighs, feet, hands, legs and sexual organs against the sexual organ of another person; this is done whether naked or clothed and is more commonly known as dry humping or dry sex. When frottage includes genital-genital rubbing, it is sometimes called genito-genital or GG rubbing.

Couples may engage in frottage as a form of foreplay or simply as a method to achieve sexual gratification without the penetrative aspects of vaginal, anal or oral sex, which may also be their personal way of preserving virginity or their way of practicing safer sex. Often, young people will engage in frottage as an earlier stage of sexual intimacy before their idea of more explicit sexual contact is defined.

Other terms associated with frottage are:

- Princeton rub, Ivy League rub, and so on are slang terms referring to male-male frot or intercrural sex or both, presumably surviving from the days when these colleges only admitted men. W. H. Auden was proud of having been the first person to use the terms Princeton rub and Princeton first-year in print.
- The term frottage derives from the French verb frotter (i.e., to rub). Three terms derive from frotter. These include frottage, the sexual act involving rubbing; frot, the sexual act that refers exclusively to male-male genital rubbing without penetration (but may also be referred to as frottage); and frotteurism, a paraphilia involving obsession with frottage or performing frottage non-consensually (e.g., pressing one's genitals against a stranger on a crowded subway); this was once called "frottage", but the usage is no longer acceptable.

=== Manual sex ===
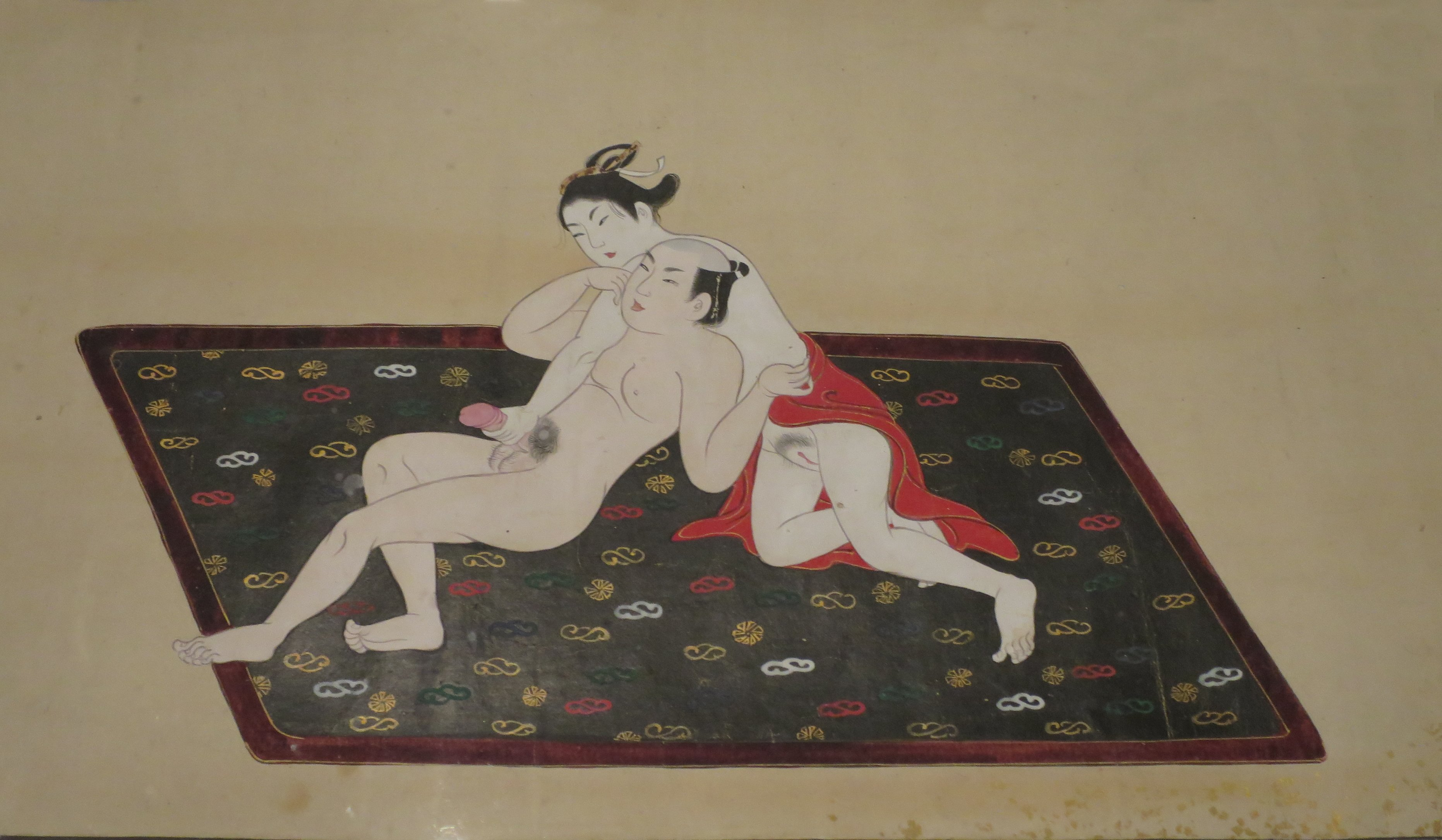
19th century Japanese illustration depicting a handjob

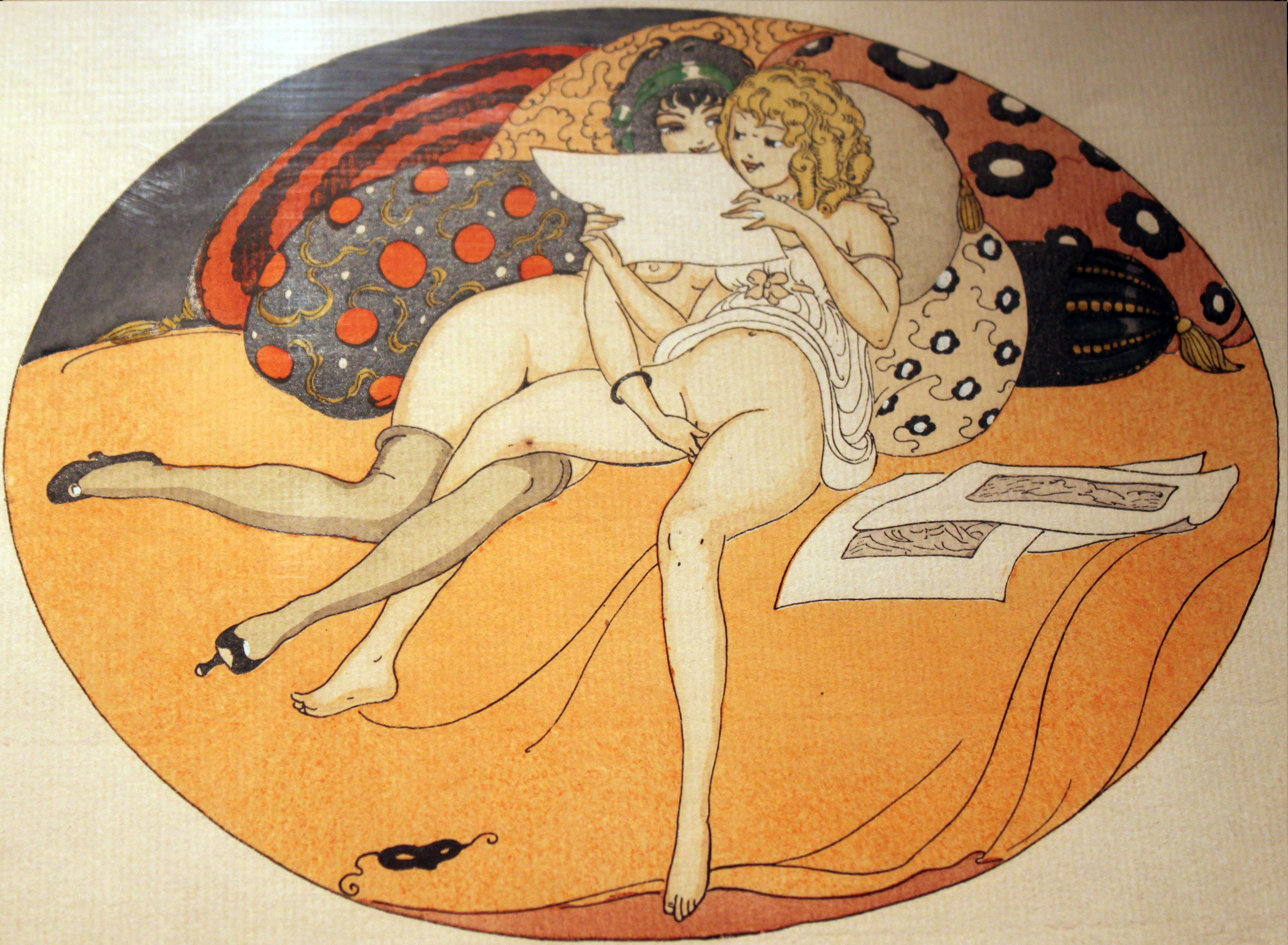
1925 illustration by Gerda Wegener depicting fingering

Manual sex (sometimes called manual intercourse) involves the use of one's hands or fingers to stimulate the genitals of another person. Types of manual sex include the handjob (the manual stimulation of the penis or scrotum) and fingering (the manual stimulation of the vagina, clitoris, or other parts of the vulva). Manually stimulating another person's anus (anal fingering) is also included.

Manual sex may be used as foreplay or as a physically intimate act in its own right. It might result in one partner achieving orgasm. If no bodily fluids are exchanged (as is common), it is considered safe sex, and greatly reduces the risk of contracting sexually transmitted infections.

=== Mutual masturbation ===
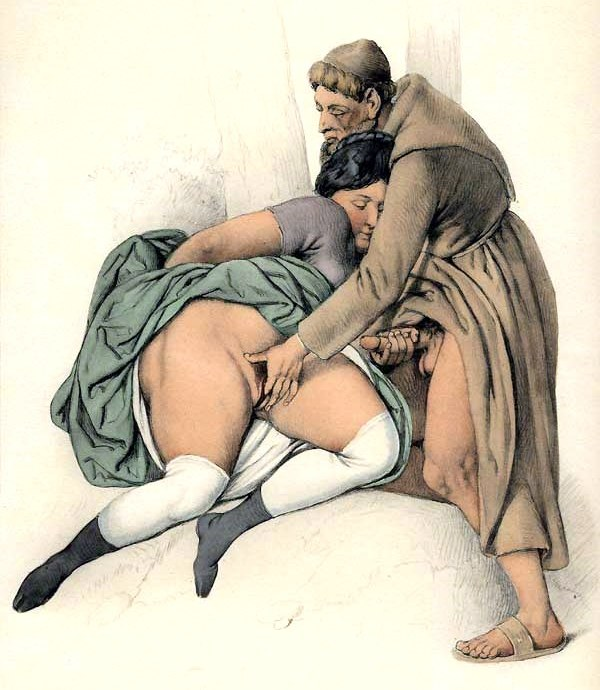
1840 Johann Nepomuk Geiger depiction of a couple engaging in mutual masturbation by touching each other's genitals

Mutual masturbation usually involves two or more people who either simultaneously masturbate or perform manual sex on each other. This may be done in situations where the participants do not feel ready, physically able, socially at liberty, or willing to engage in any penetrative sex act, or a particular penetrative sex act, but still wish to engage in a mutual sexual activity.

Mutual masturbation may be used as an alternative to penile-vaginal penetration, to preserve virginity or to prevent pregnancy.

In partnered manual genital stroking to reach orgasm or expanded orgasm, both people focus on creating and experiencing an orgasm in one person. Typically, one person lies down pantless, while their partner sits alongside. The partner who is sitting uses their hands and fingers (typically with a lubricant) to slowly stroke the penis or clitoris and other genitals of the partner. Expanded orgasm as a mutual masturbation technique reportedly creates orgasm experiences more intense and extensive than what can be described as, or included in the definition of, a regular orgasm. It includes a range of sensations that include orgasms that are full-bodied, and orgasms that last from a few minutes to many hours.

=== Exclusively non-penetrative ===
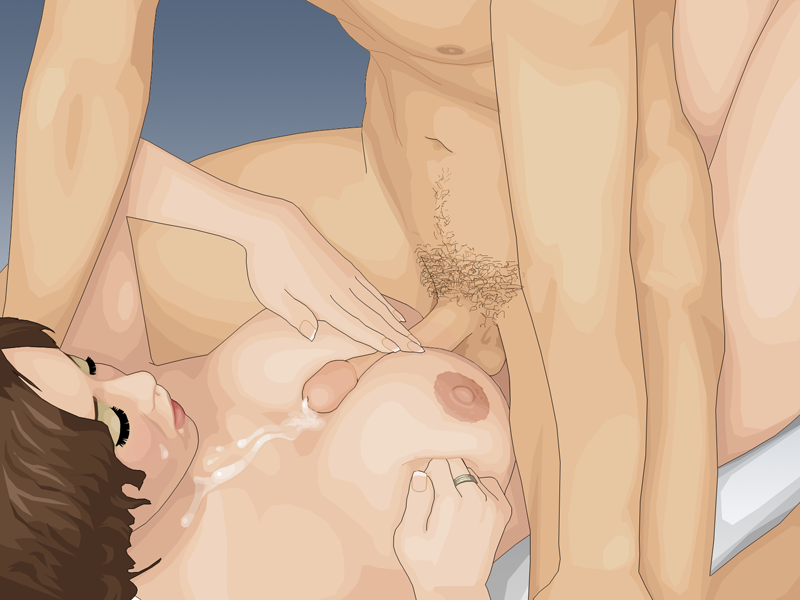
Mammary intercourse, a form of non-penetrative sex

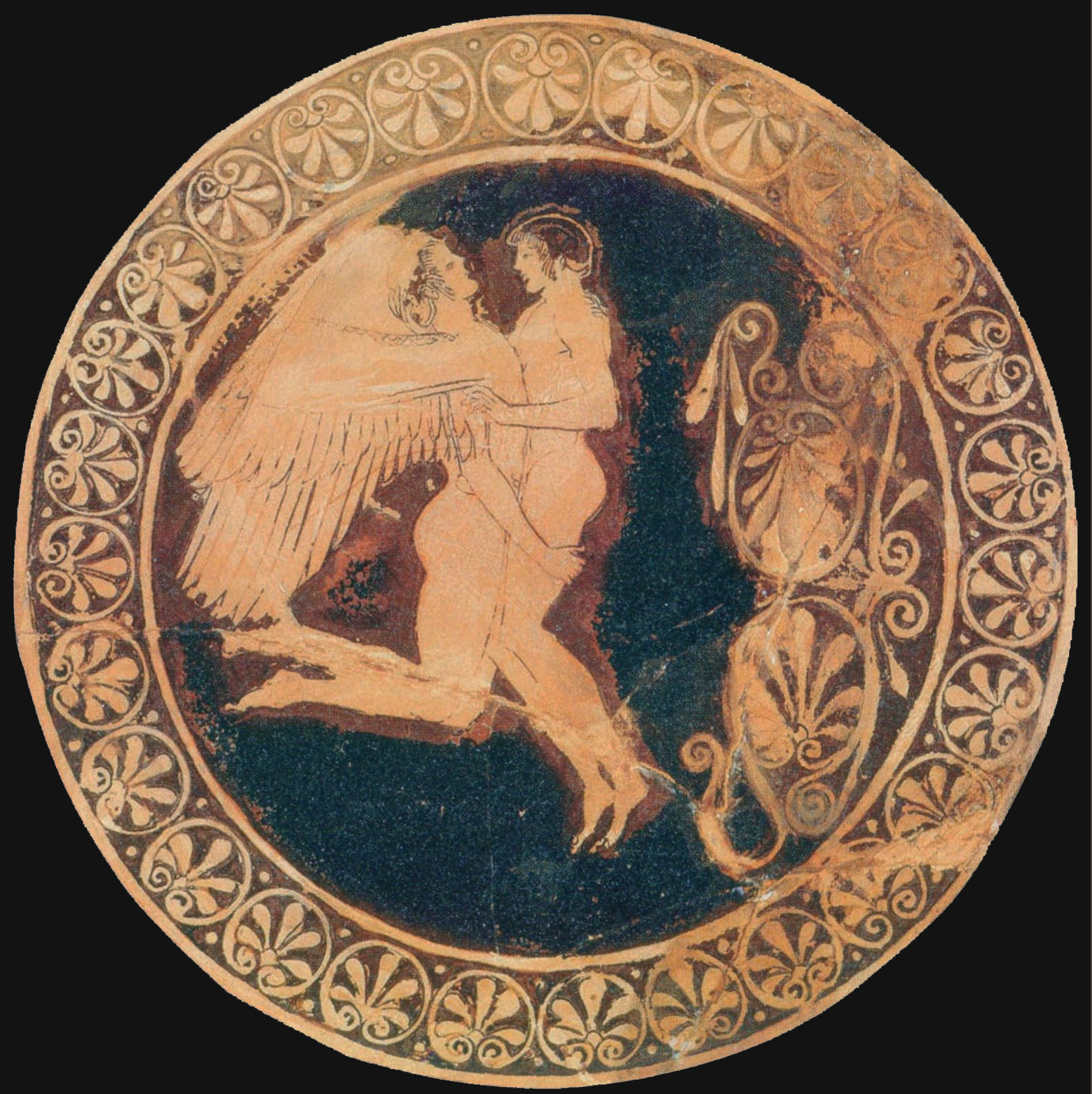
Red-figure Greek illustration of intercrural sex between a winged god (Eros or Zephyrus) and a youth (perhaps Hyacinthus)

Non-penetrative sex may sometimes be divided into acts that are exclusively non-penetrative and those that are not. Exclusively non-penetrative sexual acts include:

- Bagpiping: when the penis is inserted in the other person's armpit.
- Bundling: a courtship tradition in some Christian communities that was opposed by the religious right and has largely died out. The two young people were each in a sack tied up at the neck, and put in a bed together for the night.
- Erotic massage: rubbing of the body to create pleasure and relaxation. This can be done between two or more people of any gender and sexual orientation. It can involve the use of oils (heated or otherwise) or just the individual's hands. It is also known as sensual massage.
- Footjob: using the feet to stimulate a partner's genitals. The sexual rubbing may involve stroking to orgasm. For some individuals the practice may be an aspect of a foot fetish.
- Frot: act of genital-genital rubbing between males (especially penis-to-penis contact).
- Handjob: the manual sexual stimulation of another person's penis.
- Intercrural sex: when the penis is stimulated by placing it between another individual's thighs. Lubrication may be used to allow the penis to move more freely between the thighs.
- Intergluteal sex: stimulation of the penis using the buttocks. It differs from anal sex because no penetration of the anus occurs. The penis is stimulated by moving between the buttocks.
- Kissing: the touching of one person's lips against another person's can be regarded as a sexual act, especially deep kissing (French kissing) where one person inserts their tongue into the partner's mouth. Kissing may also be done on other parts of the body and is commonly a part of foreplay.
- Mammary intercourse: the stimulation of the penis by placing the penis between the breasts and moving the penis up and down to simulate penetration and to create pleasure.
- Nipple stimulation: when one partner caresses (either manually or orally) the nipples of their partner. Any individual can participate in this act and it can be done in pairs or groups. This can lead to orgasm for the receiving partner.
- Tribadism: a form of lesbian sex where women rub genitalia against each other (either rubbing vulvas together or rubbing one's vulva against other parts of another individual's body).

=== Non-exclusively non-penetrative ===
- Fingering: using fingers to stimulate a partner's vagina, vulva (particularly the clitoris), or anus.
- Oral sex: stimulation of the genitals using the mouth and throat; fellatio is oral stimulation of the penis, cunnilingus is oral stimulation of the vulva, and anilingus is oral stimulation of the anus.
- Vibrator stimulation: massage of genitals and erogenous zones using a vibrator.
- BDSM: various BDSM activities do not involve penetration.

== Health risks ==
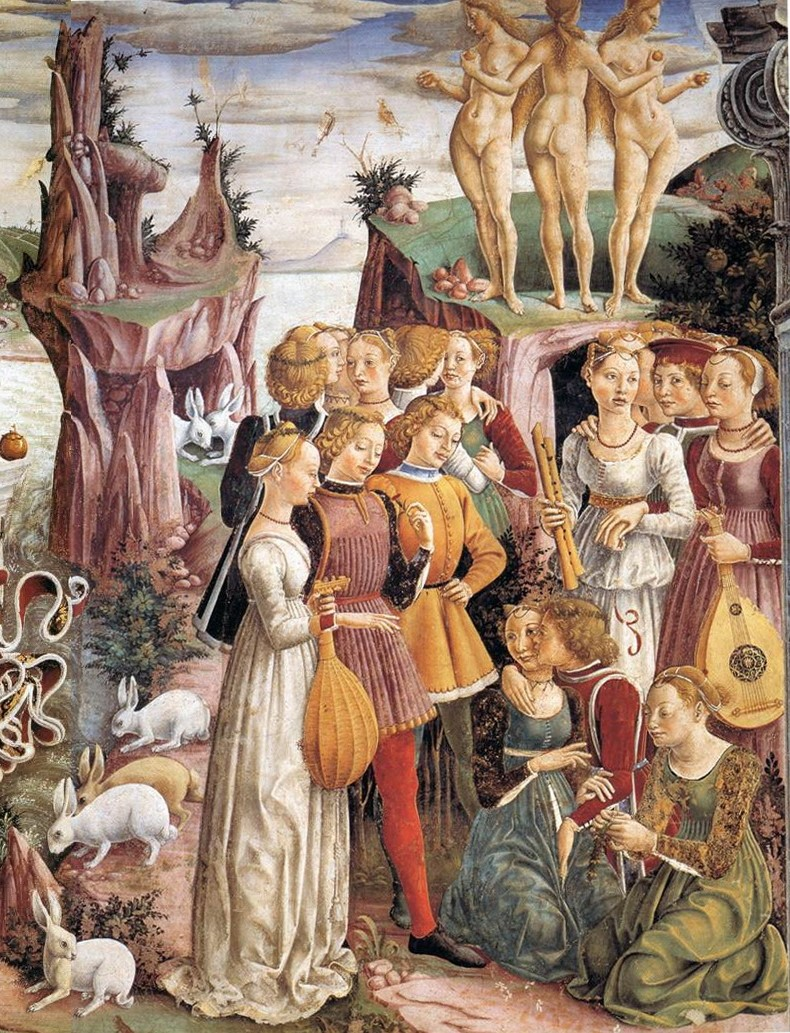
Allegory of April. Francesco del Cossa, Ercole de' Roberti and Gherardo di Andrea Fiorini. Fresco in the Schifanoia Palace, Ferrara. Around 1469

There is a sociocultural viewpoint that because non-penetrative sex usually does not involve a direct exchange of semen or vaginal fluids, and because at no point (in exclusively non-penetrative sex acts) does anything penetrate the vulva, vagina or anus, these acts are risk free. Although the risks associated with non-penetrative sex acts are significantly less than those associated with penetrative sex, there are still risks that can occur. There is a slight risk for pregnancy and sexually transmitted infections (STIs) with certain non-penetrative sex acts.

Pregnancy can still occur with anal sex or other forms of sexual activity where the penis is near the vagina (such as intercrural sex or other genital-genital rubbing) where sperm can be deposited near the entrance of the vagina and can travel along the vagina's lubricating fluids; the risk of pregnancy can also occur without the penis being near the vagina because sperm may be transported to the vaginal opening by the vagina coming in contact with fingers or other non-genital body parts that have come in contact with semen. Contrary to a common misconception, it is not possible to get pregnant from semen released in a swimming pool or any body of water without penetration. The sperm cells would be quickly killed by the chlorinated water and would not survive long enough to reach the vagina.

Like non-exclusive non-penetrative sex acts, STI transmission varies for exclusively non-penetrative sexual activities; some common STIs transmitted through exclusively non-penetrative sex acts, and how they are contracted, are the following:

- Crab lice (also known as pubic lice or crabs) can be spread through close contact with an infected person
- Chancroid is spread through skin-to-skin contact when an infected individual has sores present and these sores come into contact with another individual (generally in the genital area)
- Cytomegalovirus (CMV) is spread through coming into contact with various body secretions (saliva, genital excretions, blood etc.)
- Genital warts is similar to herpes, but caused by a different virus. It is also spread by skin-to-skin contact with the genitals.
- Herpes can be spread through kissing or anytime an infected mouth or genitals comes into contact with another individual's mouth, genitals or hand (when it occurs on the genitals, it is known as genital herpes)
- Human papillomavirus (HPV) is spread through skin-to-skin contact
- Molluscum contagiosum is spread through close contact with an infected person (sharing personal items or close skin-to-skin contact)
- Scabies is spread through close contact with an infected individual
- Syphilis can be spread through kissing or manual sex, but is much more likely to be spread through vaginal, anal or oral intercourse
- Trichomoniasis (trich) can be spread through sharing sex toys or any time genital fluid is passed from one person to another

With regard to non-exclusive non-penetrative sex acts, the risks somewhat increase because there is penetration (either of the vagina, anus or mouth) and there is the potential for bodily fluids (semen, vaginal secretions, saliva) to be exchanged. In addition to the aforementioned STIs, the following can be transmitted through non-exclusive non-penetrative sex acts:

- Chlamydia is generally spread through vaginal or anal intercourse; in rare cases, it may be spread through oral sex
- Gonorrhoea is generally spread through vaginal or anal intercourse, though it may also be spread through oral sex
- Hepatitis B can be spread through oral sex

Many individuals are concerned about the risk of HIV/AIDS. Generally, a person must either have unprotected sexual intercourse (vaginal or anal), use an infected syringe or have the virus passed from mother to child to be infected. A person cannot be infected from casual contact, such as hugging; however, there is some risk if HIV-infected blood or genital secretions (semen or vaginal secretions) enter an open wound.

The only way for complete protection from pregnancy or STI risk is to completely abstain from all sexual activities. However, there are several ways to decrease the risk, should a person decide to be sexually active.

Some barrier methods include:

- Condoms, which can provide STI protection
- Dental dams, which offer STI protection during oral sex
- Latex gloves or finger cots, which can be used during manual sex to prevent the risk of STI transmission

If a person is concerned about the minor risk of pregnancy from non-penetrative sex, there are also several hormonal contraceptive birth control methods that can be used. Dual protection (using both a barrier device and hormonal method) can be significantly effective at preventing both pregnancy and STI transmission.

== See also ==
- Edging
- Eroto-comatose lucidity
- Kunyaza
- Non-reproductive sexual behavior in animals
- Physical intimacy
- Sex magic
- Sex party
- Sex position
- Side
- 69
- Venus Butterfly
