= Intercrural sex =

Non-penetrative sex using thighs

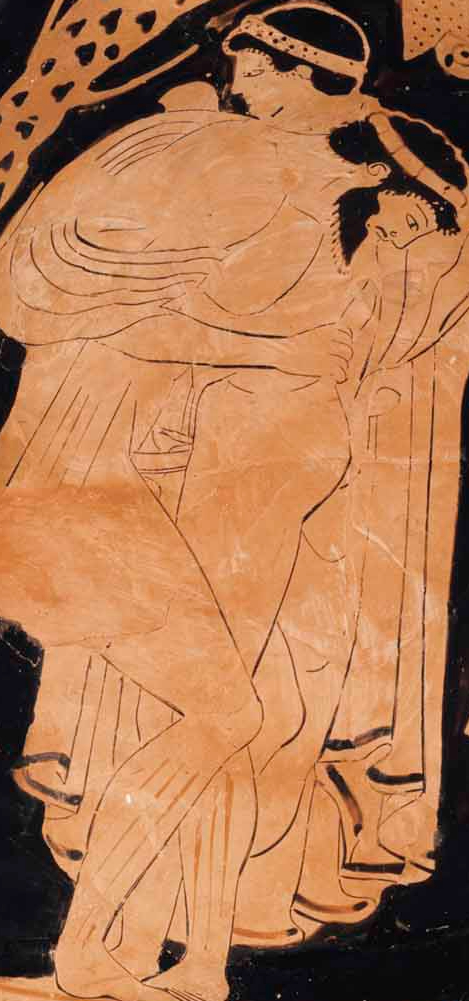
The earliest example of intercrural sex in an artwork; it, according to the author of Greek Erotica Martin F. Kilmer, depicts "the position most commonly adopted". In modern terms, it might be regarded as frotting.

Intercrural sex, also known as coitus interfemoris and interfemoral sex, or informally as thigh sex, thighing, and thighjob, is a type of non-penetrative sex in which the penis is placed between the receiving partner's thighs and friction is generated via thrusting. It was a common practice in ancient Greek society prior to the early centuries AD, and was frequently discussed by writers and portrayed in artwork such as vases. It later became subject to sodomy laws and became increasingly seen as contemptible. In the 17th century, intercrural sex was featured in several works of literature, and it took cultural prominence, being seen as a part of male-on-male sexual habits following the trial and execution of Mervyn Tuchet, 2nd Earl of Castlehaven, in 1631.

In modern times, intercrural sex is practiced in relationships of various orientations. In Paris, it was commonly performed as a part of prostitution, and in South Africa, was used to combat acquired immunodeficiency syndrome (AIDS); this practice was eventually phased out.

Knowledge of intercrural sex that was extracted from studies and its relationship to AIDS and pregnancy is low. It has been reported as a means of safe sex for human immunodeficiency virus (HIV) positive patients and has a lower risk of infection than sexual intercourse. Studies have found a fluctuating percentage of sexual assault cases have involved intercrural rape, with little to no physical evidence.

== Etymology ==
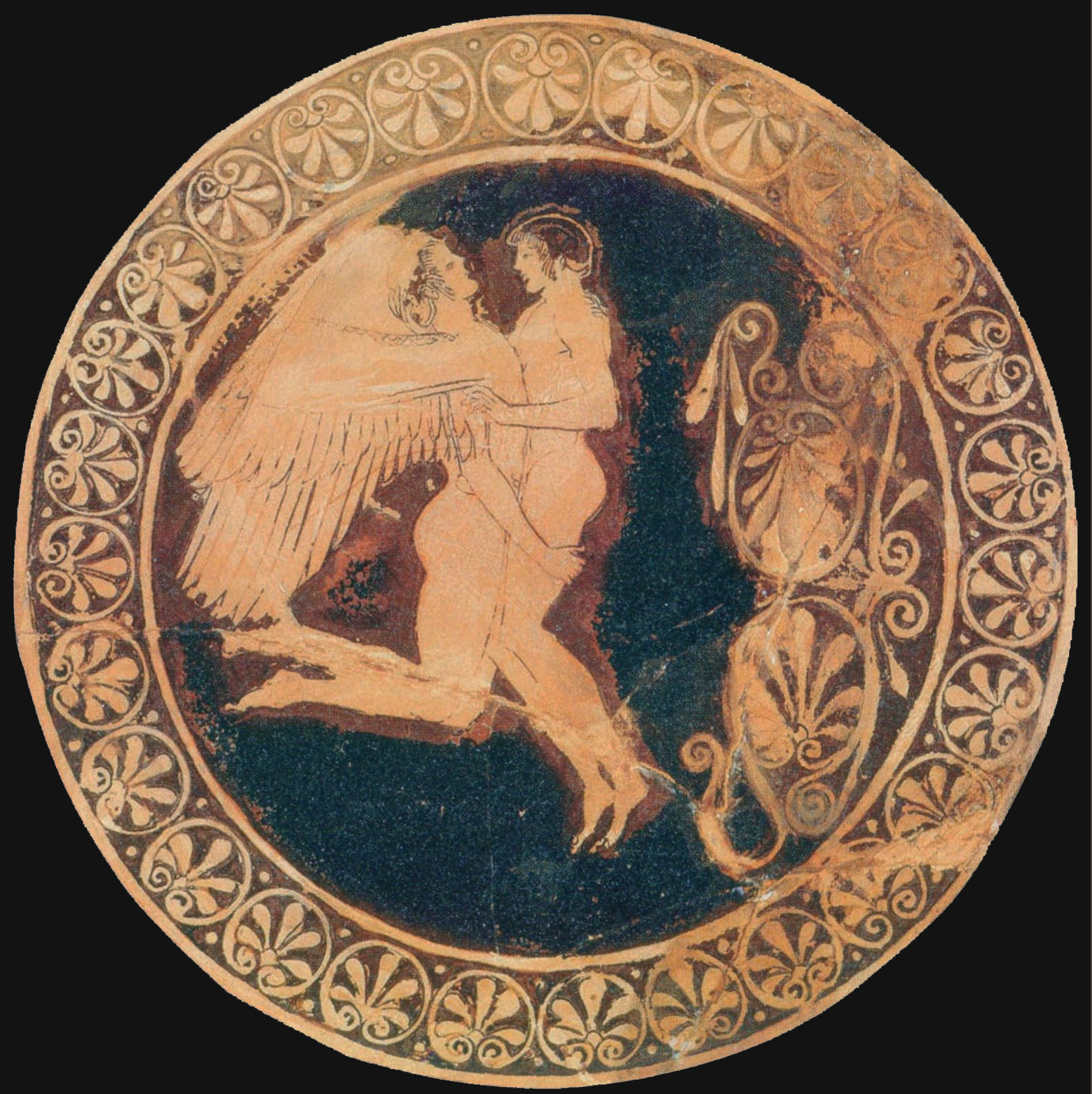
Red-figure Greek illustration of intercrural sex between a winged god (Eros or Zephyrus) and a youth (perhaps Hyacinthus)

Kenneth Dover first introduced the term "intercrural sex" in his 1978 book Greek Homosexuality. Dover used the term to refer to sexual activity between an older man and a young boy. The Ancient Greek term for this practice was διαμηρίζειν diamērizein ("to do [something] between the thighs"). Webster's Dictionary defines intercrural sex as an act in which one partner "plac[es their] penis ... between the other partner's [closed] thighs ... [and thrusts] to create friction". Synonyms include coitus interfemoris, thigh sex and interfemoral sex.

Kang Tchou of Cambridge University notes Dover's definition is similar to the idea of "heavenly love" articulated by Pausanias that "encourages a stable life-long relationship between the boy and the man and enhances the intellectual development of the younger boy".

== History and modern practice ==
=== Ancient history and the Middle Ages ===
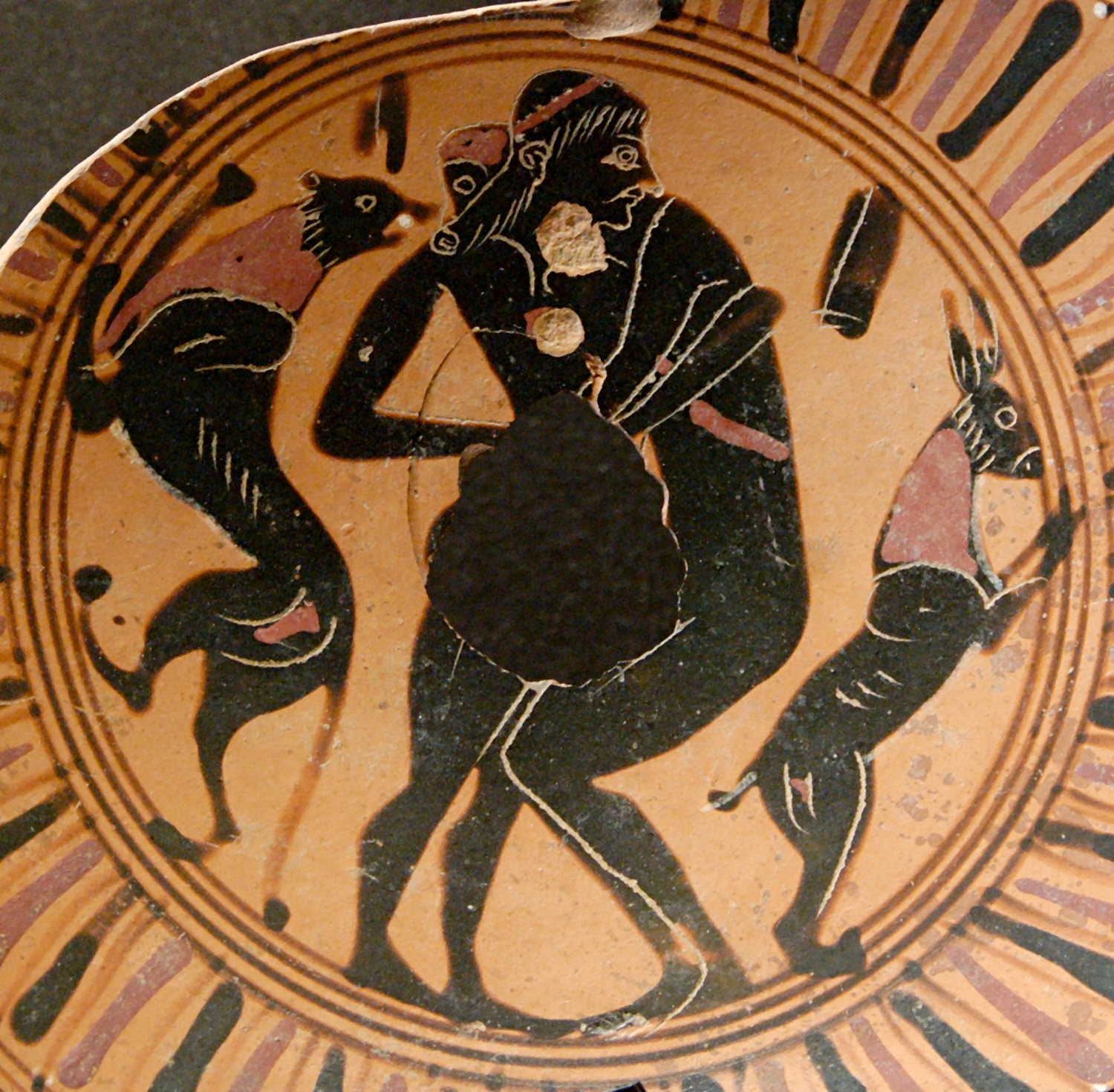
Pedarastic intercrural sex, 550–525 BCE

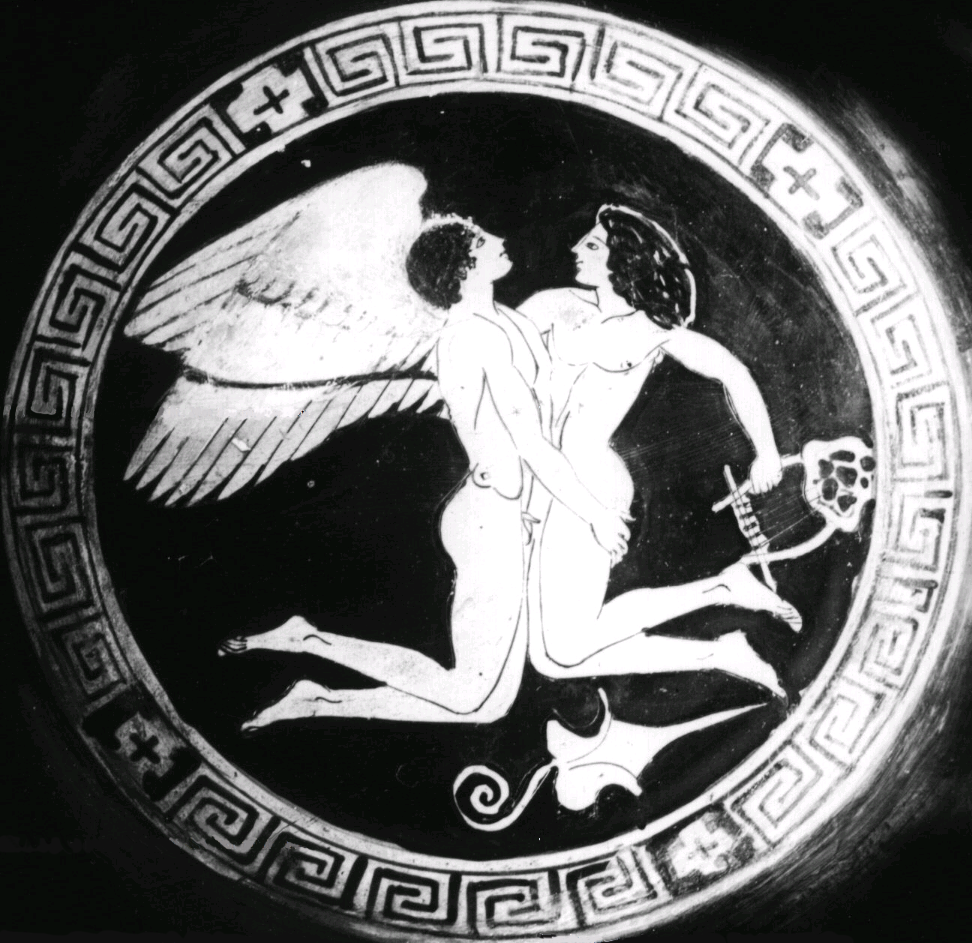
Intercrural sex between Zephyrus and Hyacinthus, 500–450 BCE

Intercrural intercourse was a common manifestation of pederasty in ancient Greece; young men were forbidden from having sex with older men in a manner beyond intercrural. It has been associated with Eromenos, although its prominence in such a relationship is undetermined and anal sex may have been more common. (Note: Dover, alongside other Classical scholars, argues that it was solely intercrural. He identified it as a "standard practice"; this assessment has been challenged due to simply equating artistic depiction with historical documentation.) Intercrural sex was not exclusively executed by homosexual men; by the early-AD era, it fell out of practice as sex with women became more encouraged in Greek society.

Intercrural sex has been depicted on artworks such as vases, where they were called "courting scenes", and was much discussed by writers. (Note: There exists no examples of male-on-female intercrural sex in either form listed.) After the 5th century BC, visual depictions of it were sparse and almost exclusively found on black-figure pottery. Zeno of Citium and Aristophanes have been said to reference the act; the latter was the first to document intercrural sex being practiced in a heterosexual capacity. Aeschylus' play Myrmidons features the implication of adult men engaging in the act. Joan Roughgarden refers to intercrural intercourse as the "gay male missionary position" of Ancient Greece.

Historical sodomy laws have included intercrural intercourse within their purview. In 15th-century Italy, it was a part of sodomy's infamous reputation; in renaissance Venice, capital punishment was considered against the partner initiating intercrural sex. Medieval penitentials often highlighted intercrural sex as sinful and gave instructions on ways to repent; early Christianity regarded intercrural intercourse as "more respectable" than anal sex. Islamic jurisprudents considered intercrural sex "reprehensible," although its lesser status led to practitioners avoiding harsh punishments.

=== Modern history ===
In early modern English, writers referred to intercrural sex as "rubbing" or "frigging". Literary works and satire depicted intercrural sex, possibly encouraging people to perform the act. Cases of sodomy, such as the trial of Mervyn Tuchet, 2nd Earl of Castlehaven in 1631 that resulted in his execution, occasionally mentioned intercrural sex. (Note: Tuchet engaged in intercrural masturbation to the point of orgasm, which led to him being sentenced for "buggery".) Tuchet's case took on significant cultural prominence and informed many people of gay male sexual habits, likely conjuring a cultural perception of intercrural sex as the main method of sex between men.

From 1660, intercrural intercourse was increasingly mentioned in literature. Richard Ellmann believed Oscar Wilde solely performed intercrural sex in the hope he could consequently declare his innocence against the allegation of "posing as a sodomite". (Note: By 1670, sodomy's legal definition was narrowed and intercrural sex was excluded from its scope.) In 1885, the UK Parliament passed a statute penalizing "gross indecency" between men under the Labouchère Amendment; intercrural sex was within the law's remit because it fell short of sodomy. (Note: The Sexual Offences Act 1967 permitted homosexual acts between two consenting adults over the age of 21 in a private residence with no one else present.)

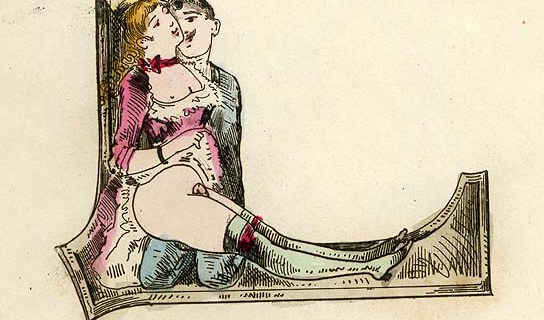
A 19th-century erotic artwork depicting intercrural sex between a man and a woman

In both the Weimar Republic and Nazi Germany, intercrural sex between men was an indictable offense, although German South West African law did not see it punishable under sodomy. Female prostitutes in 18th-century Paris commonly performed intercrural sex, which was second only to vaginal intercourse. Malawians and Mozambiquean men practiced it in mines, as did South African men in "mine marriages". Before European colonization, Azande warriors would only have intercrural sex with their young partners; it was a popular form of eroticism in pre-colonial Asia.

In Zulu intercrural sex is referred to as okusoma. It has a long history as an accepted practice for young people in southern Africa and was often practiced to prevent population growth. Traditional Zulu culture encouraged youth to engage in intercrural sex as a part of sexual socialisation—intercrural sex as practiced by young unmarried couples was also supported. A 1989 report regarding the city of Durban stated that in South Africa:

There is some evidence ... to suggest that children from conservative homes are still schooled in the practice of ukusoma, that is intercrural intercourse, but in Christian homes this was stopped long ago in favour of chastity.

== Statistics ==
=== Sexual assault ===
Hickson et al.. (1994) found intercrural sex took place in five of 219 cases of male sexual assault reviewed in England and Wales. In 2014 in Sri Lanka, 270 instances of sexual assault were medically examined; 18 occurrences of intercrural intercourse were reported. No physical injuries to the victims occurred. These assaults reportedly occurred when the victim was between the age of 4 and 19 years. A more specific earlier study of boys between the ages of 14 and 19 living in Colombo District found intercrural sex to be the second-most common form of abuse before oral sex, as reported by the victims; 20 of the 52 reported cases consisted of intercrural sex.

A 1957 analysis of 148 sexual offenders in the United States who assaulted children under the age of 14 found that 6% committed their offences by means of intercrural intercourse. Another study, two decades later, observed "intercrural ejaculation" as a "common way of sexual expression in paedophiles". In cases of child sexual abuse, there are usually no physical signs of intercrural intercourse.

=== Education ===
A 1973 study demonstrated only 3 out of every 10 boys and 4 of every 10 girls in the 14-year-old age group surveyed thought intercrural intercourse could not result in pregnancy, and therefore intercrural sex is not a recommended method of contraception. In Nigeria, 13 of 298 human immunodeficiency virus (HIV) positive respondents said the disease could be transmitted through intercrural sex while a further 30 said "no" and the remaining 255 responded with uncertainty. Intercrural sex has been reported as a safe means of sex that prevents transmission of HIV and is "lower-risk" than peno-vaginal sex. Epprecht (2019) said that as mine marriages involved intercrural sex "there was no danger of sexually transmitted infection". Mistry & Jha (2015) wrote in regards to pregnancy; "Because there is no anal or vaginal penetration, [intercrural sex] is regarded as a safe sexual practice".

In South Africa, intercrural sex has been seen as a method of preventing the transmission of acquired immunodeficiency syndrome (AIDS). From a 1997 study, 12.5% of girls who were asked how to avoid acquiring AIDS responded by suggesting intercrural sex. It was once the most common form of contraception for rural adults in South Africa. By 2012, Mary van der Riet of KwaZulu-Natal University noted; "The shift from intercrural sex to the use of the injectable contraceptive set up particular conditions for condom use in response to HIV and AIDS".

=== Demographics ===
Shere Hite's 1976 and 1981 research on female sexuality found some adult women reported being able to achieve orgasm via intercrural contact to stimulate the clitoris. Intercrural sex is popular in Sri Lanka; in a 2006 study, 4.2 percent of women reported having engaged in it while 20.7% of men said they had had homosexual intercrural sex. A 1997 report on the sexual health needs of males who have sex with males in the Calcutta suburbs found 73% of men they asked engaged in intercrural sex, though the frequency varied based on demographic factors. Only 54% of sex workers, 50% of lower-income men and 40% of Muslims reported having had intercrural sex while 82% of Hindus and 88% of middle-income men reported engaging in it.

== See also ==
- Frot
- Greek love
- History of erotic depictions
- History of human sexuality
- Homosexuality in ancient Greece
- Homosexuality in ancient Rome
- Mammary intercourse
- Pederasty
- Pederasty in ancient Greece
- Sex position
- Sexuality in ancient Rome
- Sumata
