= Hysteria (2011 film) =

2011 British rom-com film

- Theatrical poster
- Directed by: Tanya Wexler
- Written by: Jonah Lisa Dyer; Stephen Dyer; Howard Gensler
- Produced by: Tracey Becker; Judy Cairo; Sarah Curtis
- Starring: Maggie Gyllenhaal; Hugh Dancy; Felicity Jones
- Cinematography: Sean Bobbitt
- Edited by: Jon Gregory
- Music by: Gast Waltzing; Christian Henson
- Production companies: Informant Media; Beachfront Films; Forthcoming Productions; Chimera Films LLC by alternative pictures Delux Productions; Lankn Media; WDR/Arte; Arte France Cinéma
- Distributed by: Sony Pictures Classics
- Release dates: 15 September 2011 (Toronto); 17 November 2011 (Russia)
- Running time: 95 minutes
- Country: United Kingdom
- Language: English
- Box office: $15.3 million

Hysteria is a 2011 British period romantic comedy film directed by Tanya Wexler. It stars Hugh Dancy and Maggie Gyllenhaal, with Felicity Jones, Jonathan Pryce, and Rupert Everett appearing in key supporting roles. The film, set in the Victorian era, is based on the discredited theory that the medical management of hysteria led to the invention of the vibrator.

== Plot ==
Set at the end of 1880, the film depicts the invention of the vibrator. Dr. Mortimer Granville is a young physician who has difficulty with his occupation due to constant arguments over modern medicine. He gets a job assisting Dr. Dalrymple, whose practice specializes in the treatment of "hysteria", a popular diagnosis for women of that time. Medical practitioners like Dr. Dalrymple tried to manage hysteria by massaging the genital area, decently covered under a curtain, to elicit "paroxysmal convulsions", without recognizing that they were inducing orgasms. Granville meets Dr. Dalrymple's daughters, Emily, and her older sister Charlotte – a premodern feminist who runs a settlement house in a poor section of East London.

Granville seems to be good at massaging and getting a sizeable following, while at the same time, Dr. Dalrymple suggests he might eventually take over the business and marry Emily. One night after work, Charlotte comes in with her friend Fannie, who has broken her ankle. After he helps treat her, Dalrymple forbids Granville from offering any future assistance to Charlotte, hoping to dissuade her from her work in the slums. Meanwhile, the increased clientele at the practice is hard on Granville, and his hand musculature is unable to keep up with the task; an attack of cramp results in his dismissal. Fortunately, his friend, Lord Edmund St. John-Smythe, has developed an electrical feather duster, and its vibrations give Dr. Granville the idea of modifying the gadget for use as an electric massager. After successfully using it on the Dalrymple's maid Molly, he persuades Dr. Dalrymple to try the device on his patients, resulting in massive success. Mortimer and Emily then become engaged, while Charlotte struggles with supporting the welfare house.

At the engagement party, Charlotte is arrested while protecting Fannie from a police officer. Emily and Dr. Dalrymple urge Granville to testify at her trial that she is hysterical in order to prevent her from being sent to prison. During the trial, the prosecutor recommends that Charlotte be sent to a sanatorium and be forced to undergo a hysterectomy. As Mortimer speaks, he explains that the symptoms of hysteria are too common to be regarded as a mental illness and that he himself believes that Charlotte is the most generous and caring person he knows. The judge agrees with Mortimer's argument, and Charlotte is sentenced to just thirty days in prison for her assault on the policeman.

Emily decides to end her engagement with Granville after realising her only motive was to please her father. The vibrator now enters the stage as a medical device for to treat the condition, reducing treatment time while greatly increasing customer satisfaction. The royalties from its sale result in independent wealth for Granville, who has fallen in love with Charlotte. Pledging to use some of his wealth to establish a clinic at her settlement house, he proposes marriage to Charlotte and she accepts.

== Cast ==
- Hugh Dancy as Mortimer Granville
- Maggie Gyllenhaal as Charlotte Dalrymple
- Jonathan Pryce as Dr. Robert Dalrymple
- Felicity Jones as Emily Dalrymple
- Sheridan Smith as Molly
- Ashley Jensen as Fannie
- Gemma Jones as Lady St. John-Smythe
- Georgie Glen as Mrs. Parsons
- Anna Chancellor as Mrs. Bellamy
- Rupert Everett as Edmund St. John-Smythe

== Historical background ==
The film is based on historian Rachel Maines' 1999 book The Technology of Orgasm, which includes the claim that manual genital massage of women had been a common medical remedy since antiquity. In 2010, however, Maines' thesis was rebutted by Helen King, and a 2018 paper by Hallie Lieberman and Eric Schatzberg dismisses this idea as false, with no more than "circumstantial evidence that a few physicians and midwives may have practiced genital massage before the 20th century".

Hysteria was a recognized malady until the American Psychiatric Association discontinued this term in 1952. Dr. Joseph Mortimer Granville filed the first patent for an electromechanical vibrator termed Granville's Hammer in about 1883. Granville, however, did not apply his invention in the treatment of hysteria; rather, he used it to treat muscular disorders. Some believe that other physicians started to apply the vibrator for the treatment of hysteria, but this claim is under dispute, with Lieberman and Schatzberg writing that Maines "fails to cite a single source that openly describes use of the vibrator to massage the clitoral area".

== Reception ==
=== Critical response ===
On the review aggregator website Rotten Tomatoes, 59% of 132 critics' reviews are positive, with an average rating of 5.8/10. The website's consensus reads: "Hysteria has an amusing subject but its winking, vaguely sarcastic tone doesn't do the movie any favors." Metacritic, which uses a weighted average, assigned the film a score of 53 out of 100, based on 33 critics, indicating "mixed or average" reviews.

=== Box office ===
With a limited theatrical release, peaking at 218 screens, Hysteria grossed $1.8 million in the United States and Canada, and $13.5 million in other territories, for a worldwide total of $15.3 million.

== See also ==
- In the Next Room (or The Vibrator Play)
