= Joseph Mortimer Granville =

English physician and inventor

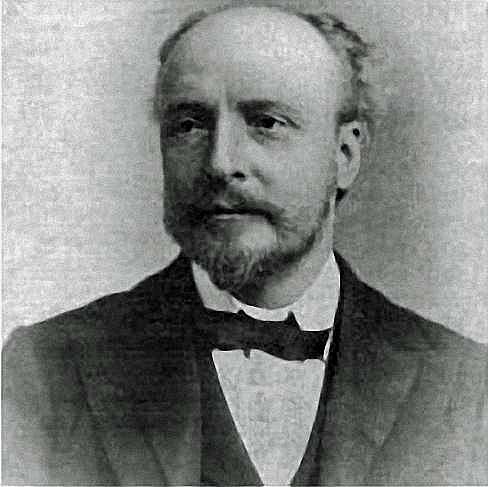
- Born: 4 May 1833; Devonport, United Kingdom of Great Britain and Ireland
- Died: 23 November 1900 (aged 67); London, UK
- Occupations: Physician, inventor

Joseph Mortimer Granville (4 May 1833, Devonport – 23 November 1900, London) was an English physician, author and inventor known for having first patented the electromechanical vibrator for relief of muscle aches, exclusively for male patients. It was famously hypothesized by Rachel Maines that the device could have also been used to treat hysteria by bringing women to orgasm. Given the lack of evidence to back this theory, however, Granville's credit as the inventor of the first electrical, vibrating sex toy is a myth.

== Biography ==
Granville qualified M.R.C.S.Eng. in 1856 and L.R.C.P.Lond. in 1861. He attained the higher medical degree M.D. in 1876 from the University of St Andrews.

In his earlier years he was much engaged in journalism, and was, we believe, a frequent contributor to the editorial columns of the Lancet. He practised at one time in Bristol, but afterwards settled in London, and gave particular attention to the treatment of gout, upon which he wrote largely.

In addition to his famous invention of an electric vibrator, he also invented a sphygmograph and a differential thermometer.

On 1 December 1858 he married Mary Ellen Ormerud in Bristol.

== Electric vibrator ==
In the late 1880s Granville invented the electric vibrator, a handheld electric operated device designed to relieve male muscle aches and pains. Originally called a percusser or more colloquially "Granville's hammer", the machine was manufactured and sold to physicians. Rachel Mains claimed that many used the equipment to create "hysterical paroxysm" in their patients with female hysteria. However, the publication of this theory has been described as representing "a failure in academic quality control" by academic researchers who, on reviewing the primary sources from Maines' book, "found no evidence in these sources that physicians ever used electromechanical vibrators to induce orgasms in female patients as a medical treatment".

Granville "argued specifically that it shouldn't be used on hysterical women". In his 1883 book, Nerve-Vibration and Excitation as Agents in the Treatment of Functional Disorder and Organic Disease, he wrote, "I have never yet percussed a female patient ... I have avoided, and shall continue to avoid the treatment of women by percussion, simply because I do not wish to be hoodwinked, and help to mislead others, by the vagaries of the hysterical state."

== In popular culture ==
Granville was portrayed by actor Hugh Dancy in the 2011 film Hysteria.

== Selected publications ==
- The Borderlands of Insanity (1877)
- Sleep and Sleeplessness (1879)
- The Secret of a Clear Head (1879)
- Common Mind-Troubles (1880)
- How to Make the Best of Life (1881)
- Nerve-Vibration and Excitation (1883)
- Gout in its Clinical Aspects (1885)
- The Secret of a Good Memory (1885)
