= Female hysteria =

Outdated diagnosis for women

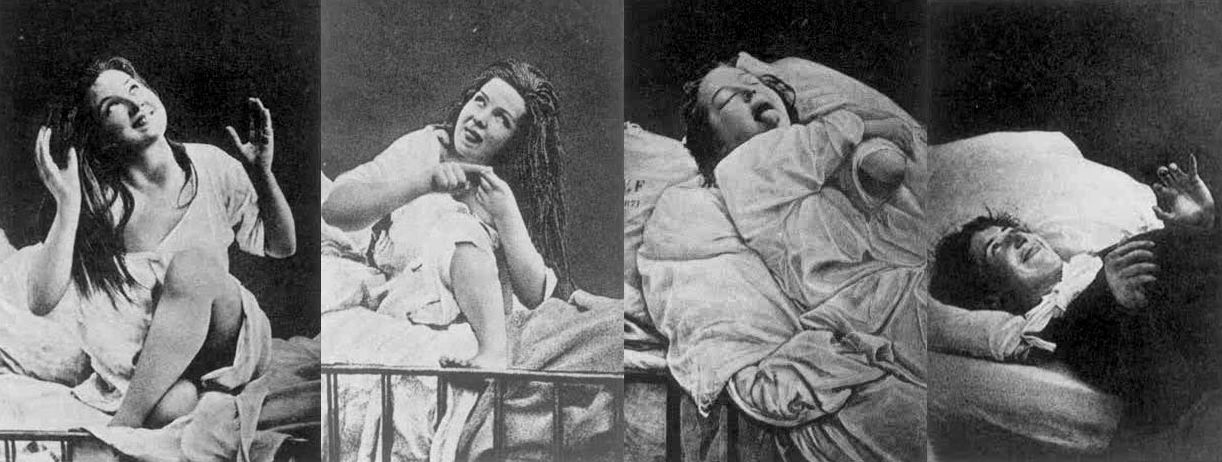
- Women with hysteria under the effects of hypnosis, 1876–1880
- Specialty: Psychiatry

Female hysteria was once a common medical diagnosis for women. It was described as exhibiting a wide array of symptoms, including anxiety, shortness of breath, fainting, nervousness, exaggerated and impulsive sexual desire, insomnia, fluid retention, heaviness in the abdomen, irritability, loss of appetite for food or sex, sexually impulsive behavior, and a "tendency to cause trouble for others". It is no longer recognized by medical authorities as a medical disorder. Its diagnosis and treatment were routine for hundreds of years in Western Europe.

In extreme cases, the woman may have been forced to enter an insane asylum or to undergo surgical hysterectomy.

In Western medicine, hysteria was considered both common and chronic among women. Though it was categorized as a disease at the time, modern day analyses suggest that hysteria's symptoms can be explained by the normal fluctuations of women's sexuality.

== Early history ==
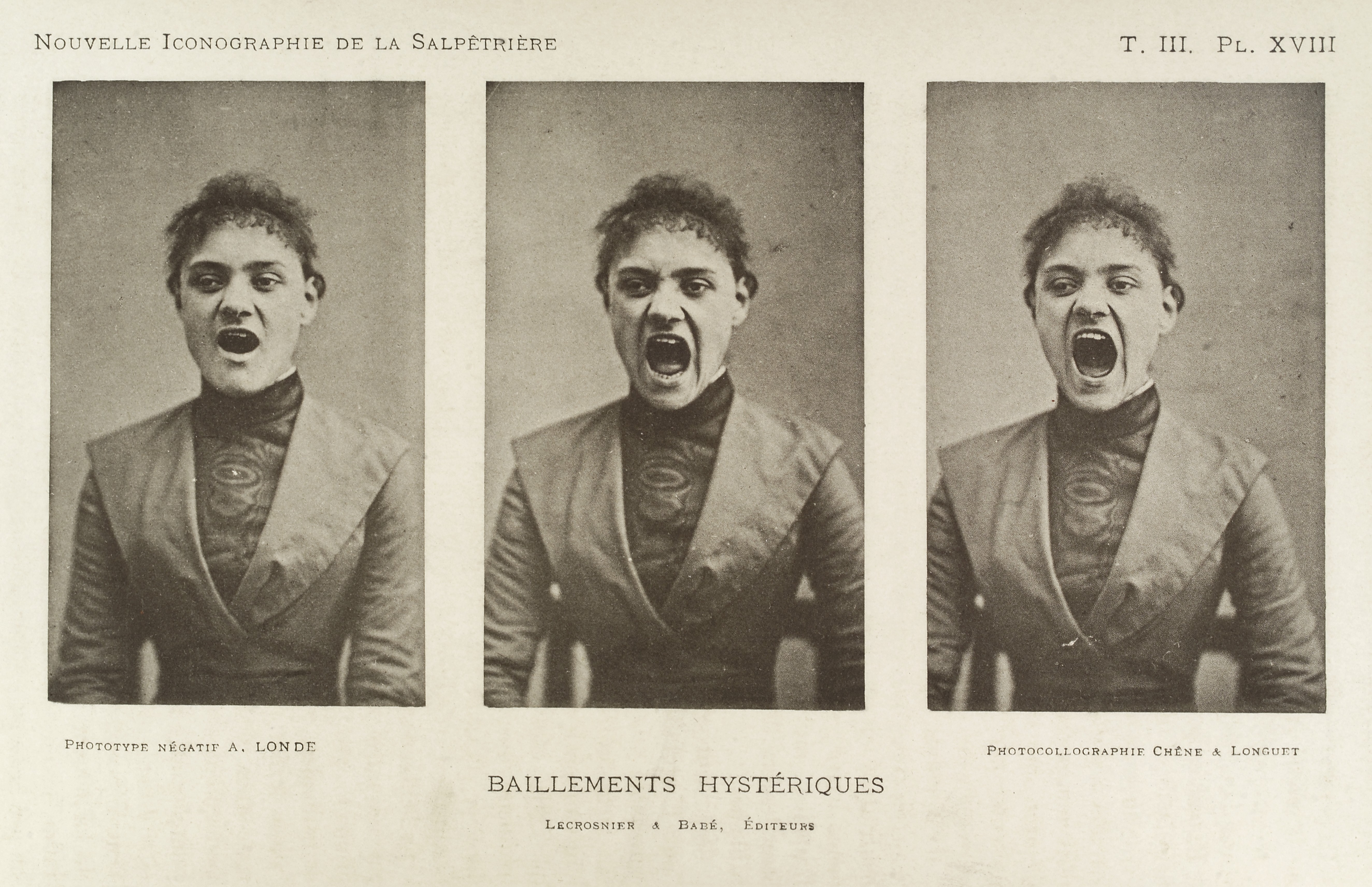
A hysterically yawning woman (institutionalized)

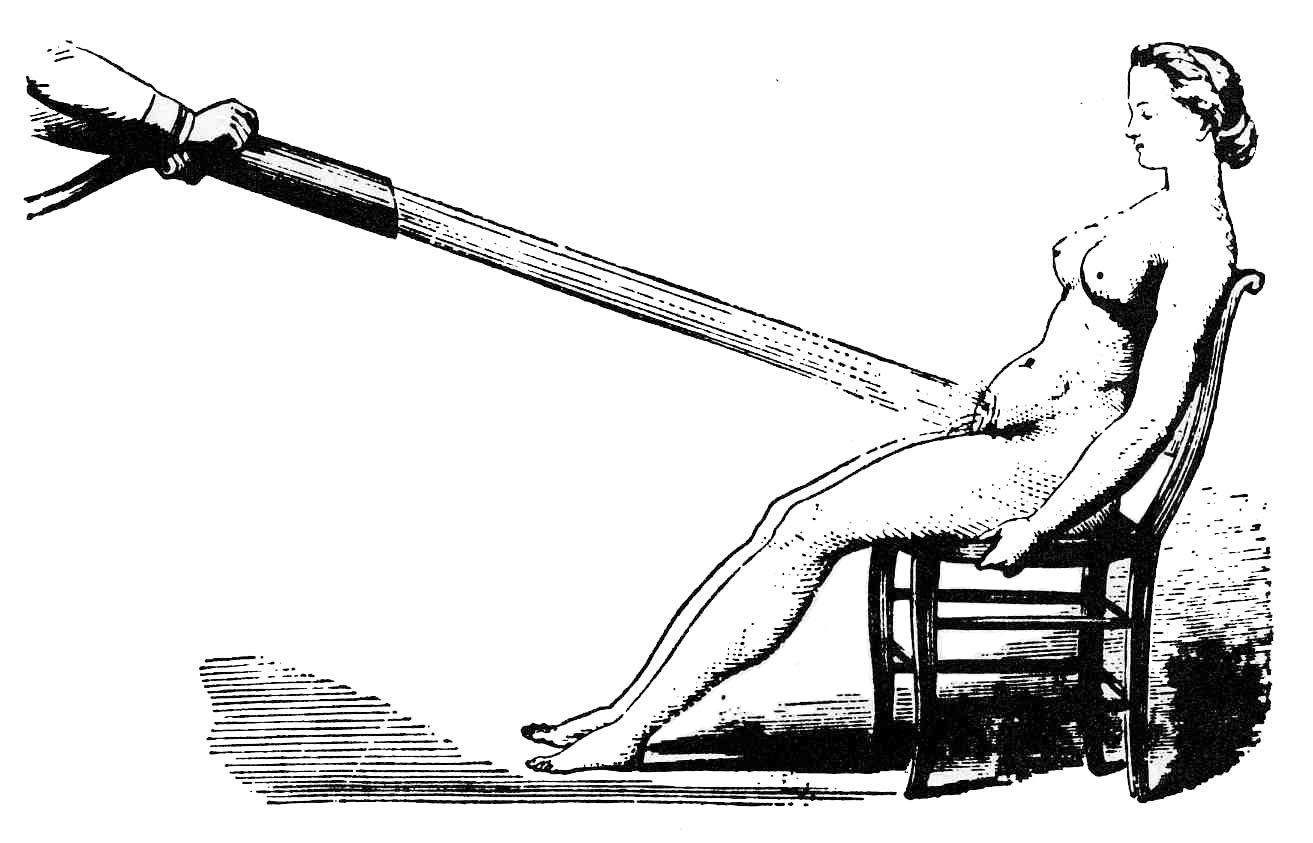
Water massages as a treatment for hysteria (c. 1860)

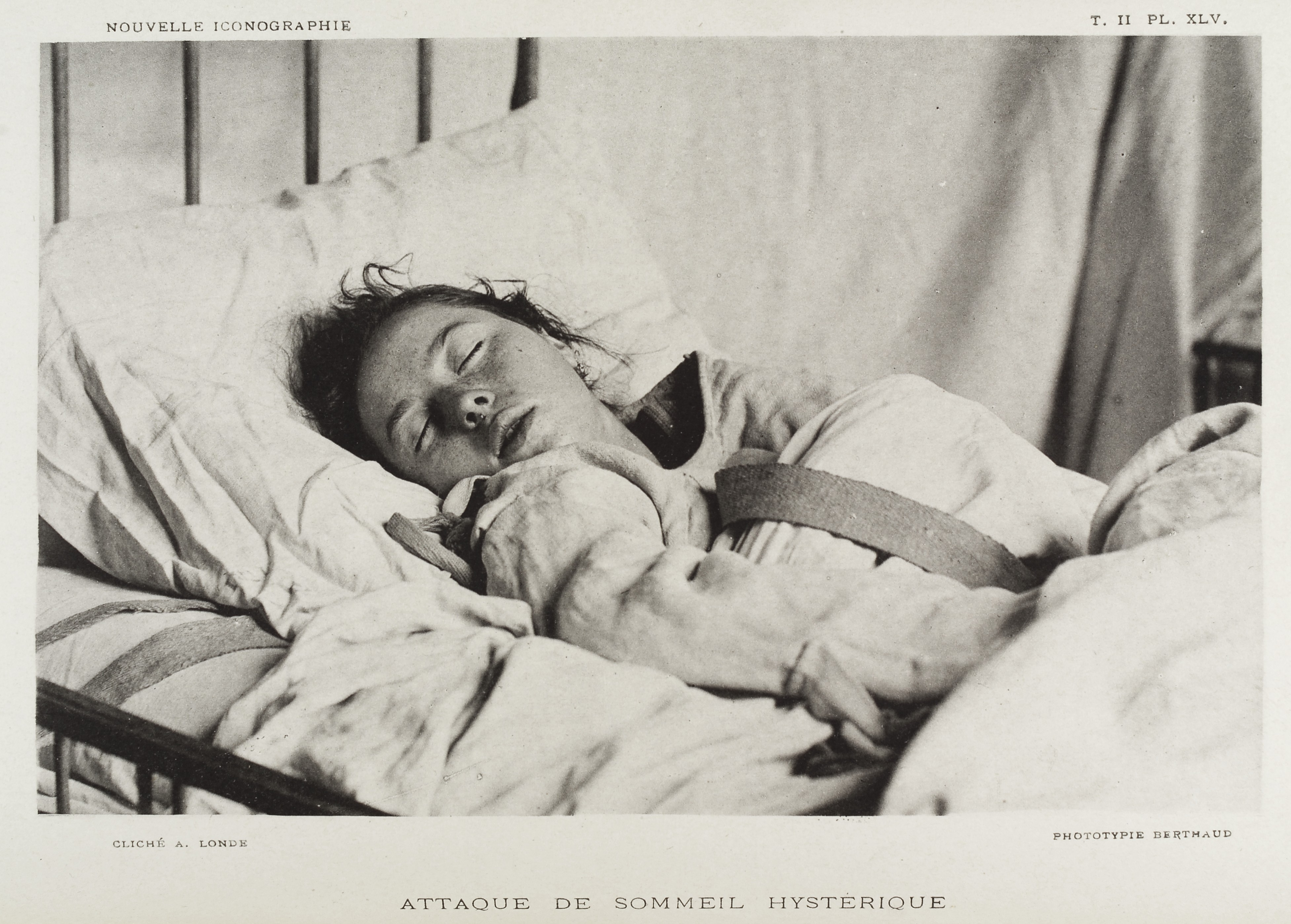
Female patient with sleep hysteria

The history of hysteria diagnoses can be traced to ancient times. Dating back to 1900 BC in ancient Egypt, the first descriptions of hysteria within the female body were found recorded on the Kahun Papyri. In this culture, the womb was thought capable of affecting much of the rest of the body, but "there is no warrant for the fanciful view that the ancient Egyptians believed that a variety of bodily complaints were due to an animate, wandering womb". In this time, the medical issue of uterine prolapse was also known.

In ancient Greece, wandering womb was described in the gynecological treatise of the Hippocratic Corpus, "Diseases of Women", which dates back to the 5th and 4th centuries BC. Plato's dialogue Timaeus compares a woman's uterus to a living creature that wanders throughout a woman's body, "blocking passages, obstructing breathing, and causing disease". Aretaeus of Cappadocia described the uterus as "an animal within an animal" (less emotively, "a living thing inside a living thing"), which causes symptoms by wandering around a woman's body putting pressure on other organs.

The standard cure for this "hysterical suffocation" was scent therapy, in which good smells were placed under a woman's genitals and bad odors at the nose. It was thought that fumigating the body with special fragrances would draw the uterus back to its natural spot in the female body. Foul smells applied to the nose would drive it down, and pleasant scents at the vulva would attract it. Sneezing could be also induced to drive the uterus back to its correct place.

The concept of a pathological "wandering womb" was later viewed as the source of the term hysteria, which stems from the Greek cognate of uterus, ὑστέρα (hystera), although the word hysteria does not feature in ancient Greek medicine.

Timaeus also argued that the uterus is "sad and unfortunate" when it does not join with a male or bear a child; thus, participating in sexual intercourse was an accepted treatment.

While in the Hippocratic texts a wide range of women were susceptible – including in particular the childless – Galen in the 2nd century omitted childlessness as a factor and instead saw the most vulnerable group as "widows, and particularly those who previously menstruated regularly, had been pregnant and were eager to have intercourse, but were now deprived of all this" (On the Affected Parts, 6.5). He also denied that the womb could "move from one place to another like a wandering animal". His treatments included scent therapy and sexual intercourse, but also rubbing ointments into the external genitalia; this was to be performed by midwives rather than male physicians.

While most Hippocratic writers saw the retention of menstrual blood in the womb as a key problem, for Galen, even more serious was the retention of "female seed". This was believed to be thinner than male seed and could be retained in the womb. Hysteria was referred to as "the widow's disease", because the female semen was believed to turn venomous if not released through regular climax or intercourse. If the patient was married, this could be completed by intercourse with their spouse.

== Middle Ages, Renaissance, and the early modern period ==
Through the Middle Ages, another cause of dramatic symptoms could be found: demonic possession. It was thought that demoniacal forces were attracted to those who were prone to melancholy, particularly single women and the elderly. Undiagnosable or incurable patients who were subsequently thought to have been possessed by the devil often exhibited symptoms that would indicate mental illness in modern day. After the 17th century, the correlation of demonic possession and hysteria were gradually discarded and instead was described as behavioral deviance, a medical issue.

In the 16th and 17th centuries, hysteria was still believed to be due to the retention of humour or fluids in the uterus, sexual deprivation, or by the tendency of the uterus to wander around the female body causing irritability and suffocation. Marriage, and regular sexual encounters with her husband, were still the most highly recommended long-term course of treatment for a woman with hysteria to purge the uterus of any built-up fluid. Self treatment such as masturbation was not recommended and was also considered taboo. Semen was also thought to have healing properties, and physicians regarded all contraceptive practices as injurious to women. Giovanni Matteo Ferrari da Gradi cited marriage and childbearing as a cure for the disease. If pleasure was obtained from them, then hysteria could be cured. If a woman was unmarried, or widowed, manual stimulation by a midwife involving certain oils and scents was recommended to purge the uterus of any fluid retention. Lack of marriage was also thought to be the cause of most melancholy in single women, such as nuns or widows. Studies of the causes and effects of hysteria were continued in the 16th and 17th century by medical professionals such as Ambroise Pare, Thomas Sydenham, and Abraham Zacuto, who published their findings furthering medical knowledge of the disease, and informing treatment. Physician Abraham Zacuto writes in his Praxis Medica Admiranda from 1637:

Because of retention of the sexual fluid, the heart and surrounding areas are enveloped in a morbid and moist exudation: this is especially true of the more lascivious females, inclined to venery, passionate women who are most eager to experience physical pleasure; if she is of this type she cannot ever be relieved by any aid except that of her parents who are advised to find her a husband. Having done so the man's strong and vigorous intercourse alleviated the frenzy.

— Rachel P. Maines, The Technology of Orgasm: "Hysteria", the Vibrator, and Women's Sexual Satisfaction, p. 29

There was continued debate about whether it was morally acceptable for a physician to remove excess female seed through genital manipulation of the female patient; Pieter van Foreest (Forestus) and Giovanni Matteo da Grado (Gradus) insisted on using midwives as intermediaries, and regarded the treatment as the last resort.

== 18th century ==
In the 18th century, hysteria slowly became associated with mechanisms in the brain rather than the uterus. This is also when it was noted both men and women could contract hysteria. French physician Philippe Pinel freed hysteria patients detained in Paris' Salpêtrière sanatorium on the basis that kindness and sensitivity were needed to formulate good care.

Another French physician, Francois de Sauvages de La Croix believed some common signs of female hysteria were "tears and laughter, oscitation [yawning], pandiculation (stretching and yawning), suffocating angina (chest pain) or dyspnea (shortness of breath), dysphagia (difficulty swallowing), delirium, a close and driving pulse, a swollen abdomen, cold extremities, and abundant and clear urine."

Anton Mesmer, a German physician, came up with the theory of “animal magnetism”, later referred to as mesmerism. Mesmer saw “animal magnetism” as energy that flowed through the nervous system. He would try to manipulate that “energy” to relieve his patients of hysteria. One of the methods he used was having his patients hold onto metal rods that were electrically charged. Mesmer's findings on "animal magnetism" were later discredited.

== 19th century ==
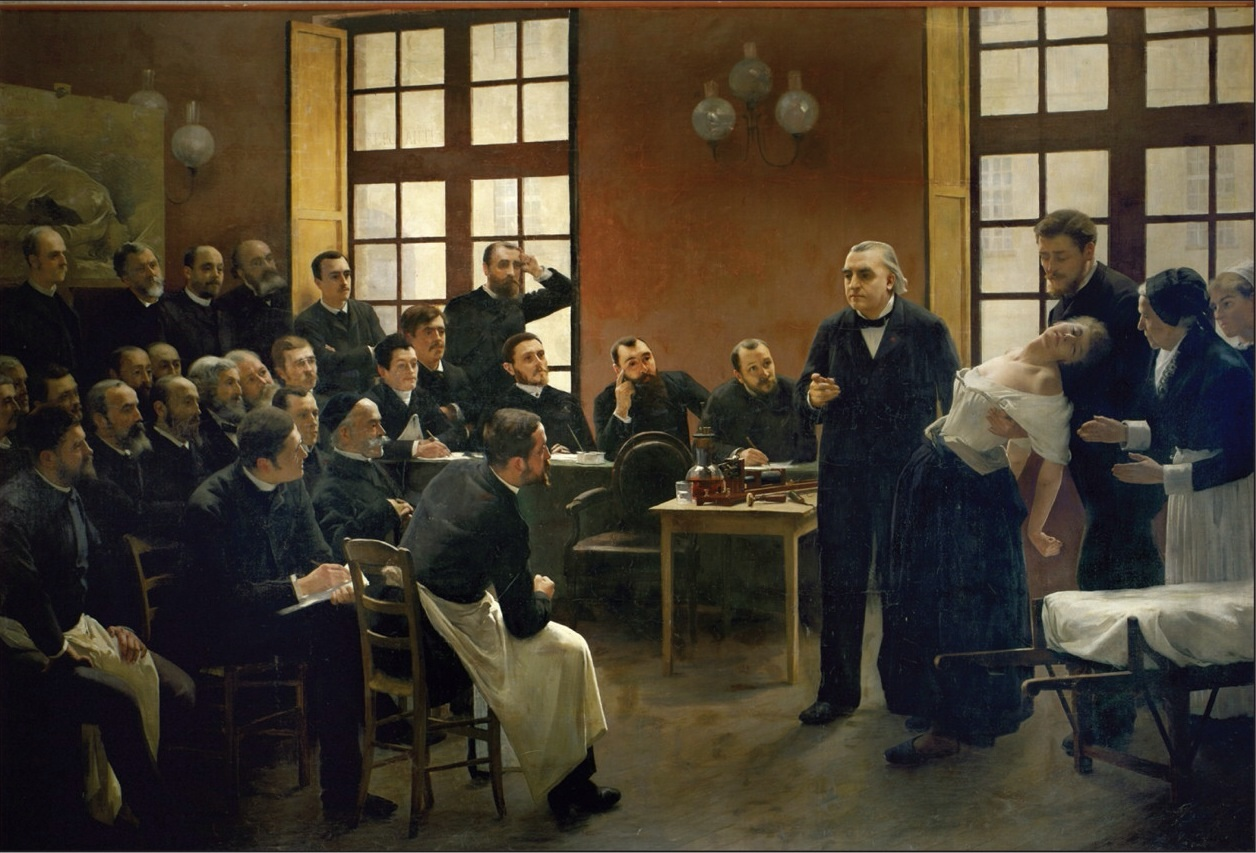
A Clinical Lesson at the Salpêtrière (1887), depicting Jean-Martin Charcot showing the hysteria patient Marie Wittman

Jean-Martin Charcot argued that hysteria derived from a neurological disorder and asserted that it was more common in men than women. Charcot's theories of hysteria being a physical condition of the mind and not of the body led to a more scientific and analytical approach to hysteria in the 19th century. He dispelled the beliefs that hysteria had anything to do with the supernatural and attempted to define it medically. Charcot's use of photography, and the resulting concretization of women's expressions of health and distress, continued to influence women's experiences of seeking healthcare. Though older ideas persisted during this era, over time female hysteria began to be thought of less as a physical ailment and more of a psychological one.

George Beard, a physician who cataloged an incomplete list including 75 pages of possible symptoms of hysteria, claimed that almost any ailment could fit the diagnosis. Physicians thought that the stress associated with the typical female life at the time caused civilized women to be both more susceptible to nervous disorders and to develop faulty reproductive tracts. One American physician expressed pleasure in the fact that the country was "catching up" to Europe in the prevalence of hysteria.

In 1875, Edward Hammond Clarke wrote “Sex in Education”, a book discussing his views on men and women's education. Clarke believed that if women were educated, the energy in their bodies would go to the brain instead of the reproductive organs, hindering childbirth. He cited clothing, food, exercise, and education as causes of “Leucorrhoea, amenorrhea, dysmenorrhea, chronic and acute ovaritis, prolapsis utari, hysteria, neuralgia”. Clarke believed that men came into the world fully developed, while women did not, and that imposing men's education on women would worsen their problem. His views were condemned by many women's organizations.

According to Pierre Roussel and Jean-Jacques Rousseau, femininity was a natural and essential desire for women: "Femininity is for both authors an essential nature, with defined functions, and the disease is explained by the non-fulfillment of natural desire." It was during the Industrial Revolution and the major development of cities and modern lifestyles that disruption of this natural appetite was thought to cause lethargy or melancholy, leading to hysteria. At the time female patients sought medical practitioners for the treatment of hysteria with massage. The rate of hysteria was so great in the industrial period that women were prone to carry smelling salts about their person in case they swooned, reminiscent of Hippocrates' theory of using odors to coerce the uterus back into place. For physicians, manual massage treatment was becoming laborious and time-consuming, and they were seeking a way to increase productivity.

Rachel Maines hypothesized that physicians from the classical era until the early 20th century commonly treated hysteria by manually stimulating the genitals of female patients to the point of orgasm, which was denominated "hysterical paroxysm", and that the inconvenience of this may have motivated the original development of and market for the vibrator. Other hysteria treatments included pregnancy, marriage, heterosexual sex, and the application of smelling oils on female genitals. Maines's theory that hysteria was treated by manually stimulating female patients' genitalia to orgasm is widely repeated in the literature on female anatomy and sexuality. However, some historians dispute Maines's claims regarding the prevalence of this treatment for hysteria and its relevance to the invention of the vibrator, describing them as a distortion or overgeneralization of the evidence. In 2018, Hallie Lieberman and Eric Schatzberg of Georgia Institute of Technology challenged Maines's claims for the use of electromechanical vibrators to treat hysteria in the 19th century. Maines stated that her theory of the prevalence of masturbation for hysteria and its relevance to the invention of the vibrator is a hypothesis and not proven fact.

Frederick Hollick was a firm believer that a main cause of hysteria was licentiousness present in women.

== 20th century ==
In the 1910s, psychiatrist L. E. Emerson was heavily involved in treating patients of hysteria at the Boston Psychopathic Hospital. Emerson published case studies on his patients, who were often "young, single, native-born, and white" and either had been raped or had a lack of healthy sexual relationships. One of his more famous works was a case study of a woman called "Miss A". In the study, Emerson summarized the patient's experience with sexual violence, which he said that most women with hysteria had encountered. Miss A practiced self-harm, which Emerson deduced to be a release for the sexual assault she had previously experienced and a substitute for masturbation. Another case study was of Sally Hollis, a woman who often viewed her experience with sexual assault in terms of her own failures and female aggression. Believing the roots of hysteria lay in sexual conflict, Emerson noted the theme of lack of sexual knowledge amongst these women, viewing them as repressed. Their sexual ignorance ranged from lack of knowledge about menstruation to conception to the process of giving birth.

Some women purposefully sought out the "hysteric" diagnosis because they believed it could provide an answer to what they were experiencing. Most of the patients that Emerson saw were single because they were either young or had purposefully avoided men. Author Elizabeth Lunbeck wrote that these women typically fell into three categories. They either withdrew from the heterosexual sphere entirely despite wanting to participate; they experienced something that was sexually unwanted but would experience guilt over what happened like Sally Hollis; or they were haunted by their sexual traumas in the past. As hysteria was becoming a more prominent diagnosis amongst women, police began treating any report for sexual assault or rape with skepticism, with the common belief at the time being that "sexual assault is physically impossible without consent".

== Freud and decline of diagnosis ==
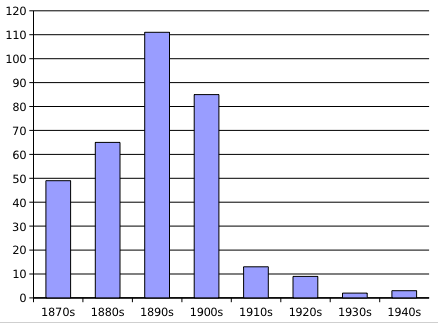
The number of French psychiatric theses on hysteria

During the early 20th century, the number of women diagnosed with female hysteria sharply declined. Some medical authors claim that the decline was due to gaining a greater understanding of the psychology behind conversion disorders such as hysteria. The understanding of the field of psychiatry was becoming more nuanced at the time, with Sigmund Freud's introduction of the theory of psychoanalysis and his other ideas surrounding women and their sexuality.

With so many possible symptoms, historically hysteria was considered a catch-all diagnosis that any unidentifiable ailment could be assigned. As diagnostic techniques improved, the number of ambiguous cases that might have been attributed to hysteria declined. For instance, before the introduction of electroencephalography, epilepsy was frequently confused with hysteria.

Sigmund Freud claimed that hysteria was not physical at all but rather an internal emotional condition brought on by trauma that could affect both men and women and prevented them from enjoying sex in the normal way. This would later lead to Freud's development of the Oedipus complex, which connotes femininity as a failure, or lack of masculinity. Although some earlier studies had posited that men were also prone to hysteria, over time, the condition was related mainly to issues of femininity as the continued study of hysteria took place only in women.

Many cases that had previously been labeled hysteria were reclassified by Freud as anxiety neuroses. It was Freud's theory that hysteria may have been related to the unconscious mind and separate from the conscious mind or the ego. He was convinced that deep conflicts in the mind, some concerning instinctual drives for sex and aggression, were driving the behavior of those with hysteria. The illness of hysteria is an "expression of the impossibility of the fulfillment of the sexual drive because of reminiscence of the Oedipal conflict". This hypothesis is a driving force behind the psychological theory of psychoanalysis, as a way to help patients that had been diagnosed with hysteria reduce internal conflicts causing physical and emotional suffering.

New theories relating to hysteria came from speculation; doctors and physicians could not connect symptoms to the disorder, causing it to decline rapidly as a diagnosis. Hysteria was officially removed from the DSM in 1980.

Today, female hysteria is no longer a recognized illness, but different manifestations of hysteria are recognized in other conditions such as schizophrenia, borderline personality disorder, functional neurological symptom disorder, and anxiety attacks.

== Relationship with women's rights and feminism ==
In the 1980s, feminists began to reclaim the term "hysteria", using it as a symbol of the systematic oppression of women and reclaiming the term for themselves. The idea of hysteria became an embodiment of the oppressions against women, especially among sex-positive feminists, who believed sexual repression being considered hysteria was a form of oppression. The idea stemmed from the belief that hysteria was a kind of pre-feminist rebellion against the oppressive defined social roles placed upon women. Feminist writers such as Catherine Clément and Hélène Cixous wrote in The Newly Born Woman from a place of opposition to the theories proposed in psychoanalytical works. Clément, Cixous and other feminist writers pushed back against the notion that socially constructed femininities and hysteria are natural to being female. Feminist social historians of both sexes argue that hysteria is caused by women's oppressed social roles, rather than by their bodies or psyches.

== Representation in creative works ==
=== Charlotte Perkins Gilman ===
"The Yellow Wallpaper" is a short story by Charlotte Perkins Gilman that demonstrates the mistreatment of hysteria and illuminates the deep-rooted misogynistic systems that existed at the time. Published in 1892, this piece is an early example of media in which medical care is interrogated through a feminist lens. In the story, the female protagonist is confined to an upstairs room at the instruction of her husband, who is a physician, which paradoxically worsens her condition. Over the course of her lengthy confinement, the protagonist becomes obsessed with the yellow wallpaper and believes she can see a woman inside it as her mental state deteriorates.

=== Safe ===
The 1995 film Safe explores the harmful effects of sexism in healthcare on the psychological and physical health of women and girls. It explores the connections between mental illness, the misdiagnosis of mental illness when physical conditions proved difficult to diagnose, feminism, and healthcare disparities that result from deep-rooted sexism in the medical industry.

== See also ==
- The Cancer Journals
- Social degeneration
- Gender bias in medical diagnosis
- Hysterical contagion
- Male hysteria
- Mass hysteria
- Mass psychogenic illness
- Premenstrual dysphoric disorder
- Race suicide
- Sexual frustration
- Social hygiene
- Vapours
