= Pulsocon =

Device that a doctor claimed would improve blood circulation in women

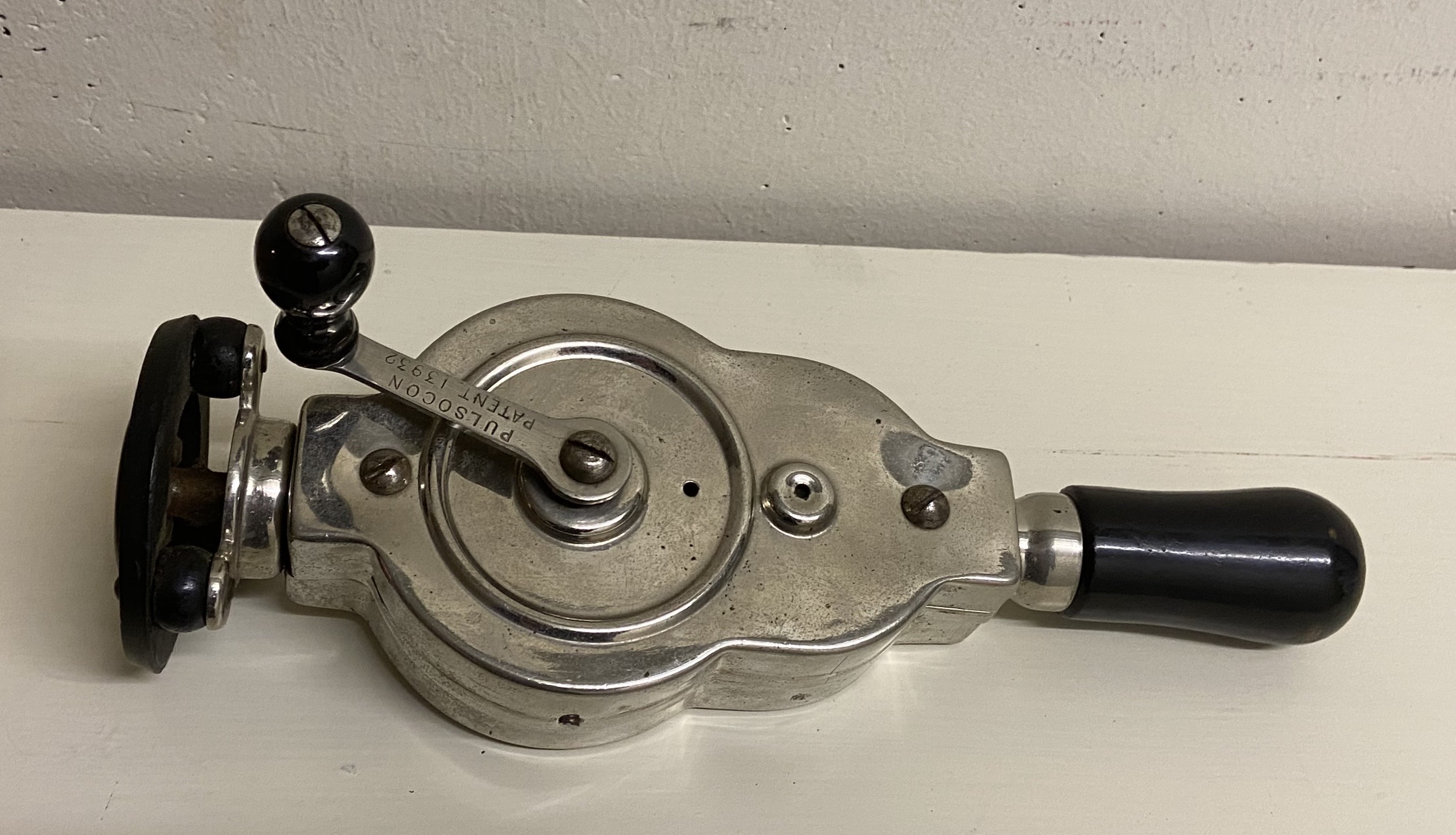
A Pulsocon

The Pulsocon of Dr. Gerald Macaura (also called the Macaura blood circulator) was a device that, according to Macaura, should help women to loosen up and improve their blood circulation.

Macaura patented in 1902 a blood circulator in the USA. In 1904 he settled to the United Kingdom and patented the blood circulator again in 1904. with the patent number 13932, the number which is also on the Pulsocon. The Pulsocon was operated by turning the handcrank on one side of the device, and depending on how fast the crank was rotated, it could produce up to 5000 vibrations per minute. The device could also be equipped with additional attachments of any form required and was presented as a cure for numerous illnesses. In 1911 he entered into a cooperation with the British Appliance Manufactural Co. Ltd. in Leeds, which then produced the Pulsocon. It had a lot of success throughout a long period of time.

== Fraud claims ==
Macaura presented the Pulsocon in 1911 at the Royal Albert Hall, London, which led to protests by medical students who opposed the devices alleged curative effects. During his stay in Paris in 1914, the French medics argued against the effectiveness of the curative effects of the Pulsocon and Gerald Macaura was condemned to three years in jail for fraud. He also was not a doctor as he claimed. He, though, had to stay only one year in prison, and during his stay in prison, he reportedly earned $75,000 from the sale of the Pulsocon.

The Pulsocon was to be produced either until the 1920s or until the 1950s. After the Pulsocon became known as a vibrator in movies like Gavroche et le pulsocon from 1913, his success diminished amongst the well established society. In the 1950s, it was reported that the device was still used as a muscle stimulator in Irish gyms.
