= Vibrator (sex toy) =

Electric-powered sex toy

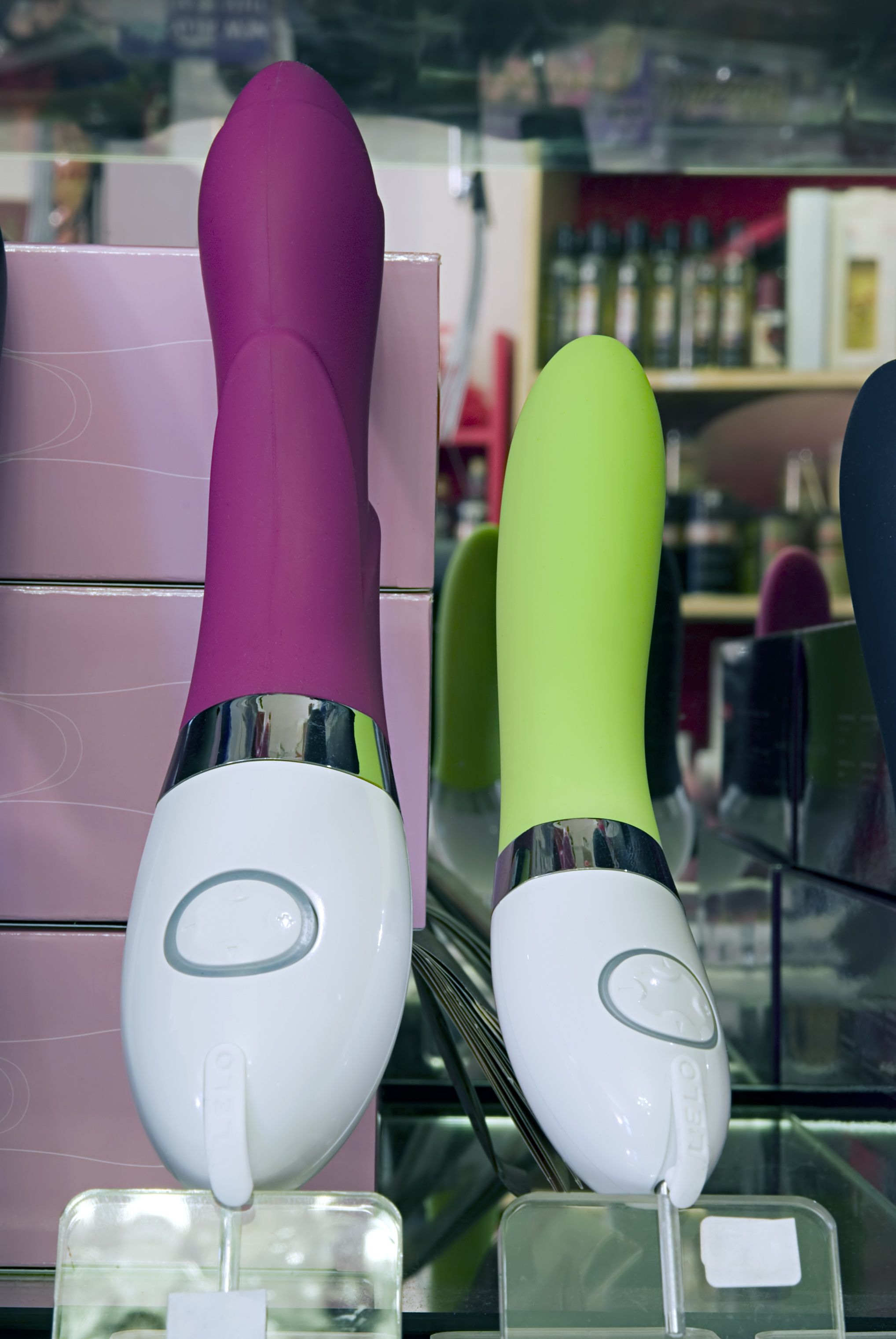
Two vibrators in a sex shop

A vibrator, sometimes described as a massager, is a sex toy that is used on the body to produce pleasurable sexual stimulation. There are many different shapes and models of vibrators. Most modern vibrators contain an electric-powered device that pulsates or throbs. Vibrators can be used for solo play, partnered play by one or more people, or in an orgy. Devices designed for use by couples as tools of genitals stimulation have been developed. They can be applied to erogenous zones, including the vulva, vagina, penis, scrotum, anus, or rectum, to stimulate the sexual response of both partners. The application of these devices can be used for the purpose of sexual stimulation, the release of sexual frustration, and the achievement of orgasm. Vibrators are a recommended treatment by sex therapists for women who experience difficulties reaching orgasm through masturbation or intercourse.

== Types ==
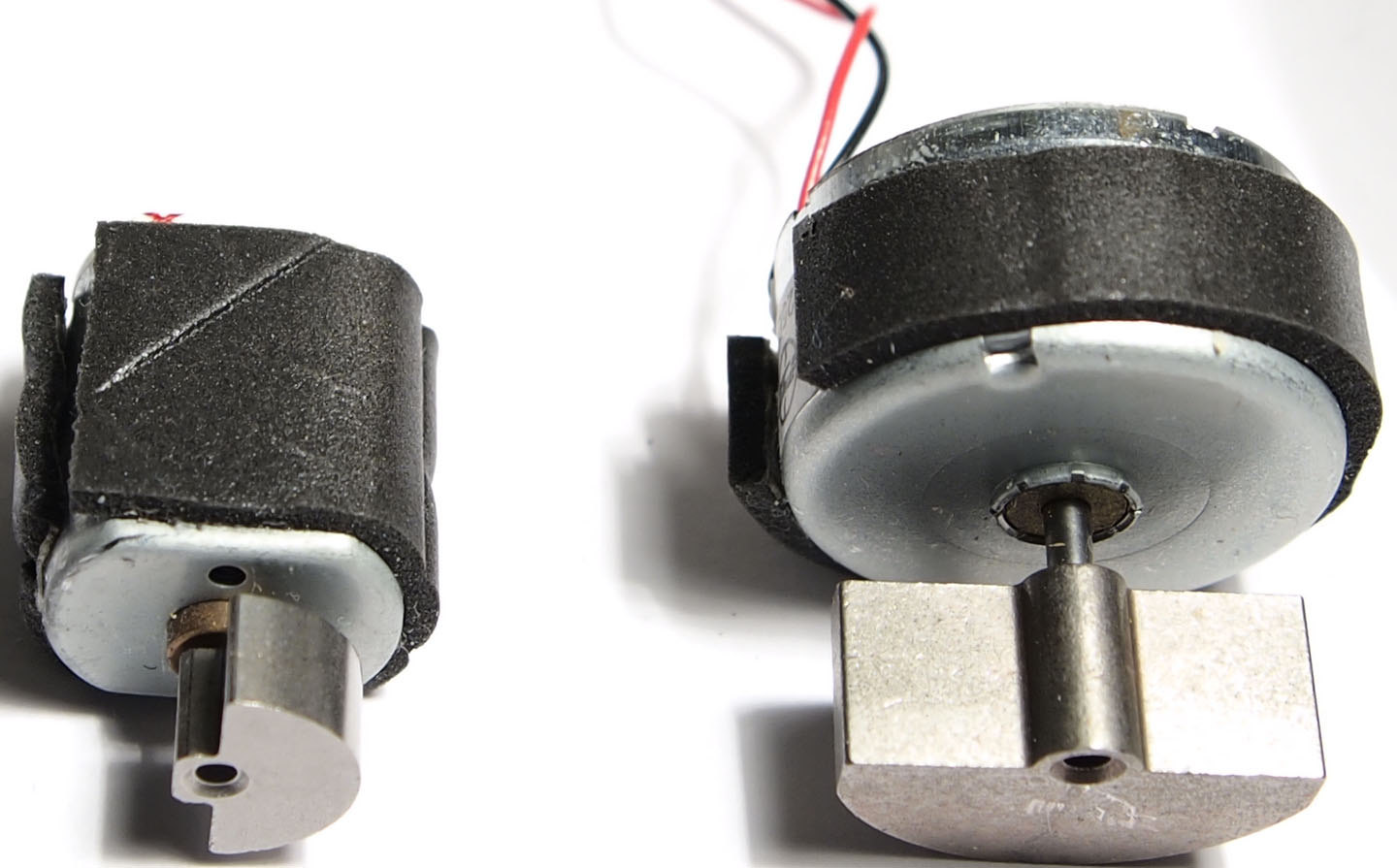
An example of an eccentric weight vibration motor

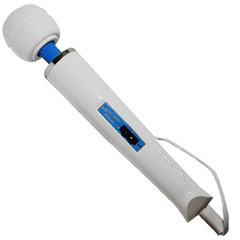
Hitachi Magic Wand

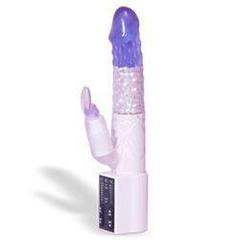
Techno rabbit vibrator

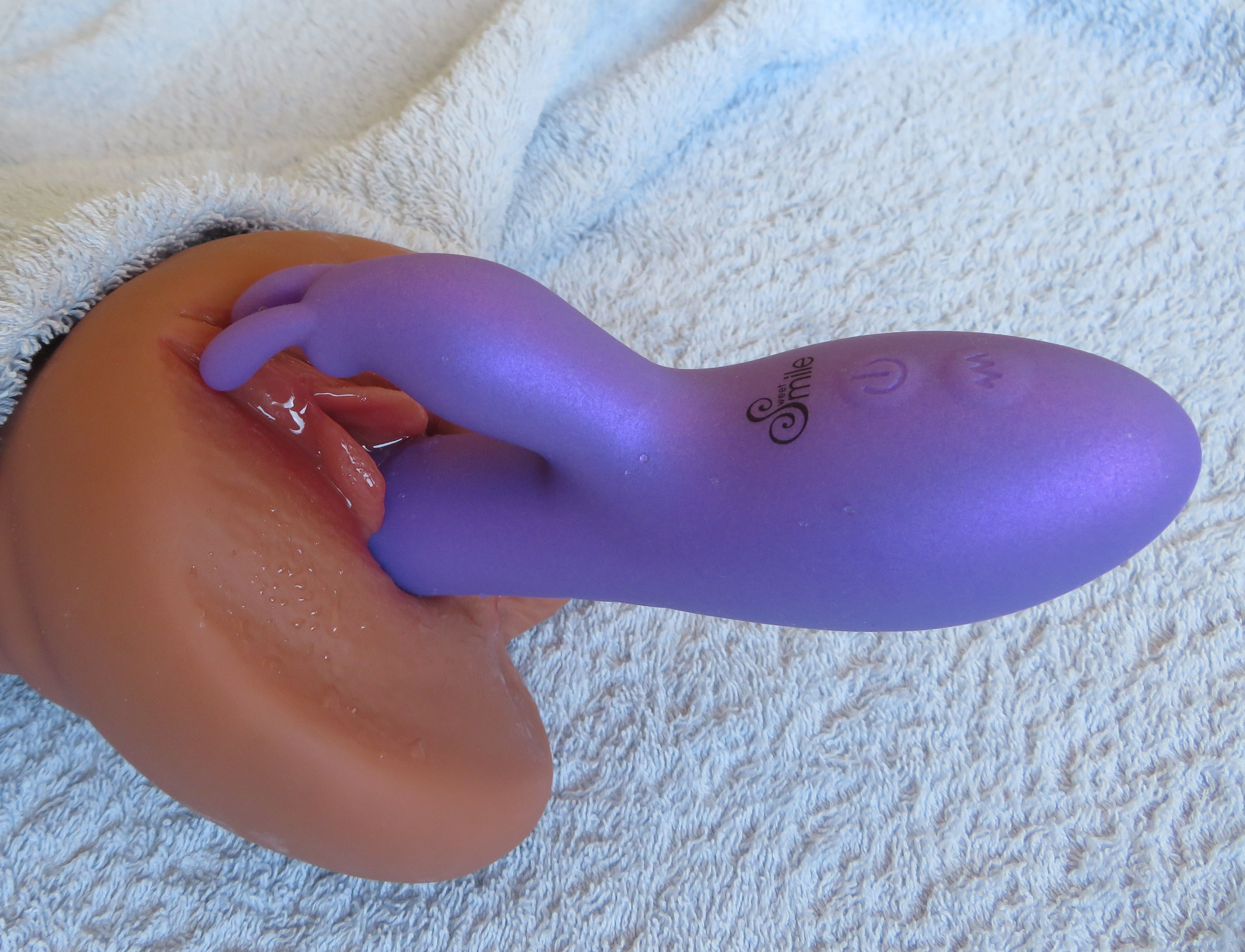
Rabbit vibrator in a silicone model of a vulva

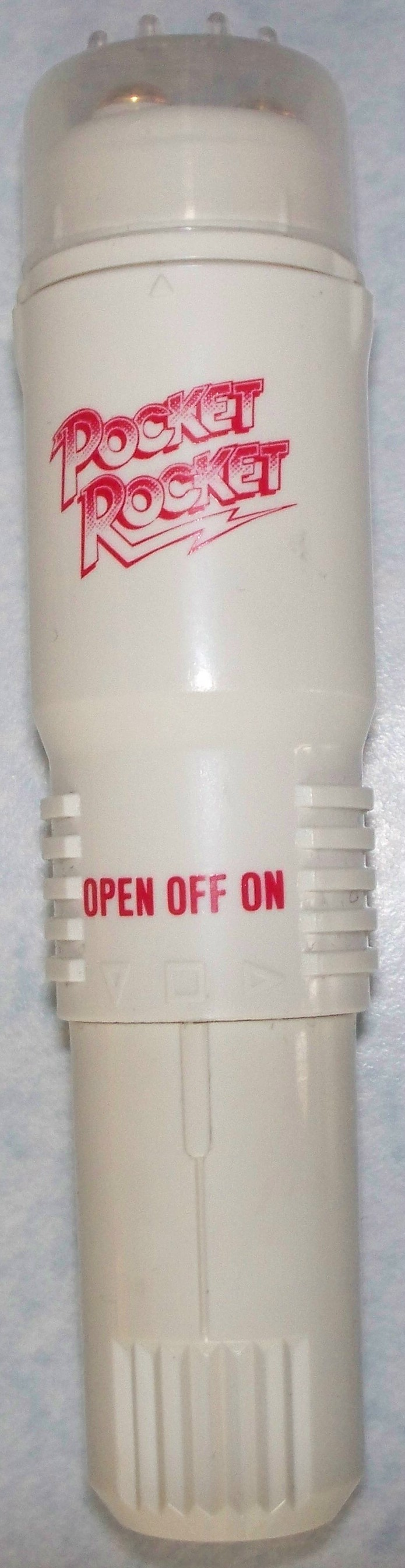
A "pocket rocket" type vibrator

Vibrators often generate their vibrations using eccentric weights driven by a conventional electric motor, but some use electromagnetic coils. Some vibrators are marketed as "body massagers" – although they still may be used, like the ones sold as adult sex toys, for autoeroticism. Some vibrators use batteries, while others have a power cord that plugs into a wall socket. There is also a vibrator that uses the flow of air from a vacuum cleaner to stimulate the clitoris.

Modern versions of old musical vibrators synchronize the vibrations to music from a music player or a cell phone. Some luxury brand vibrators are also completely covered in medical-grade silicone with no exposed control panels or seams. Although proper cleaning is required for any sex toy, having fewer places for bacteria to grow reduces the chance of infection. While some companies sell significantly larger dildos and vibrators, most that are marketed for vaginal or anal insertion are sized around the average penis size.

There is a wide range of vibrators, but most of them fall into several broad categories:

- Clitoral: Powerful wand vibrators externally stimulate the clitoris. The most common type of clitoral vibrator is small, egg-shaped, and attached to a multi-speed battery pack by a long cord. Variations include vibrators shaped like narrow bullets, animals, ergonomic forms, miniature rockets, and large human tongues. Regardless of the design, the main function of the clitoral vibrator is to vibrate at varying speeds and intensities.
- Dildo-shaped: These approximate a penis shape and size and can be made of plastic, silicone, rubber, vinyl, or latex. Vibrating dildos can be used for personal pleasure or for mutual pleasure with a partner. They may be used for vaginal and oral penetration, as well as anal penetration. They come in different sizes, colors, and textures, and they may be double-ended, so that both anal and vaginal stimulation can be performed at the same time.
- Love egg: An egg- or bullet-shaped vibrator for clitoral or penile stimulation and vaginal or anal insertion. Wired and wireless variants are both common.
- Rabbit: Two-pronged for stimulation of both the vagina and the clitoris simultaneously. It was featured on Sex and the City in the late 90s. The rabbit vibrator actually consists of two vibrators of different sizes. A phallus-like-shaped vibrator is intended to be inserted into the vagina to stimulate the vagina, while a smaller clitoral stimulator is placed facing forward onto the main vibrator. The rabbit vibrator was named after the shape of the clitoral stimulator, which resembles a pair of rabbit ears.
- G-spot: Similar to the traditional vibrator but with a curve and often a soft, jelly-like coating. The curve is designed to stimulate the G-spot. This type of vibrator is made of materials such as silicone or acrylic. It can be used with or without the vibrations.
- P-spot: Similar to a G-spot vibrator with a curve to stimulate the prostate. The use of vibrators to regularly stimulate the prostate can help improve prostate health.
- Anal vibrators: These are designed for anal use and have either a flared base or a long handle to grip to prevent them from slipping inside and becoming lodged in the rectum. Anal vibrators come in different shapes, but they are commonly butt plugs or phallus-like vibrators.
- Butterfly: Vibrator strapped around legs and waist for hands-free clitoral stimulation during sexual intercourse. It comes in three variations: traditional, remote control, and with anal or vaginal stimulators. They are made of silicone, plastic, latex, or jelly.
- Cock ring: Vibrator (usually cordless) inserted in or attached to a cock ring, usually for stimulation of the clitoris during sexual intercourse.
- Dual/triple area: These vibrators are designed to stimulate multiple erogenous zones simultaneously or independently. They are usually in the form of a clitoral stimulator and vaginal stimulator; an example is the Sybian. For men, some vibrators stimulate the prostate and perineum at the same time. Triple-area vibrators are designed to stimulate three erogenous zones simultaneously or independently. These provide stimulation to the vagina, clitoris, and anal regions in women. The designs for men stimulate the anus, perineum, and scrotum.
- Pocket rocket: Shaped like a cylinder, with one of its ends having some vibrating bulges. It is meant to stimulate the clitoris or nipples, not for vaginal insertion. A pocket rocket is a mini-vibrator that is typically about five inches long and resembles a small, travel-sized flashlight. These are described as discreet sex toys that may be carried around in one's purse or briefcase but are not one of the most silent vibrators. Due to its small dimension, it is powered by a single battery and usually has only one speed.
- Suction/Rose: Vibrators that are designed to provide suction and vibration to the clitoris, they first entered the market in 2014. A popular example is the "Rose toy", this vibrator is shaped like a hybrid tea rose. Suction toys can also be used to prevent mastitis for breastfeeding mothers.

=== Common features ===
Although many vibrators are marketed as waterproof, most should not be submerged. The ones designed for underwater use may be used in the swimming pool, while bathing, etc. These vibrators may be recommended to be used with a water-compatible lubricant, such as a silicone-based lubricant. This is not the case for all waterproof vibrators, as silicone-based lubricants can degrade silicone vibrators. Multi-speed vibrators allow users to customize how fast the vibrator's pulsing or massaging movements occur. Depending on the specific type of vibrator, the speed change is made by simply pushing a button a certain number of times, allowing users to change speeds several times during use. Bendable vibrators can adapt to the body shape and are used to find and stimulate hard-to-reach erogenous zones. They can be shaped to act like other vibrators, such as G-spot, anal, penis, or dual.

Programmable and remote-control vibrators can be worn in or against the genitals, which can be pre-programmed or controlled remotely. Other vibrators come with a handheld remote that can be used to adjust speed and intensity. Smart vibrators can connect to mobile applications via Bluetooth LE connections, allowing features like long-distance remote control over the Internet, vibration in sync with music, and programmable vibrations. Certain manufacturers, including Lovense, incorporate functions such as long-distance control, sound synchronization, and app-based operation.

Some vibrators, designed to be discreet, are shaped as everyday objects, such as lipstick tubes, cell phones, or art pieces. Occasionally, some women use actual mobile phones in this function. The undercover vibrators are usually relatively small, and most of the time they have only one speed and are powered by a single battery.

== History ==
=== Early development ===
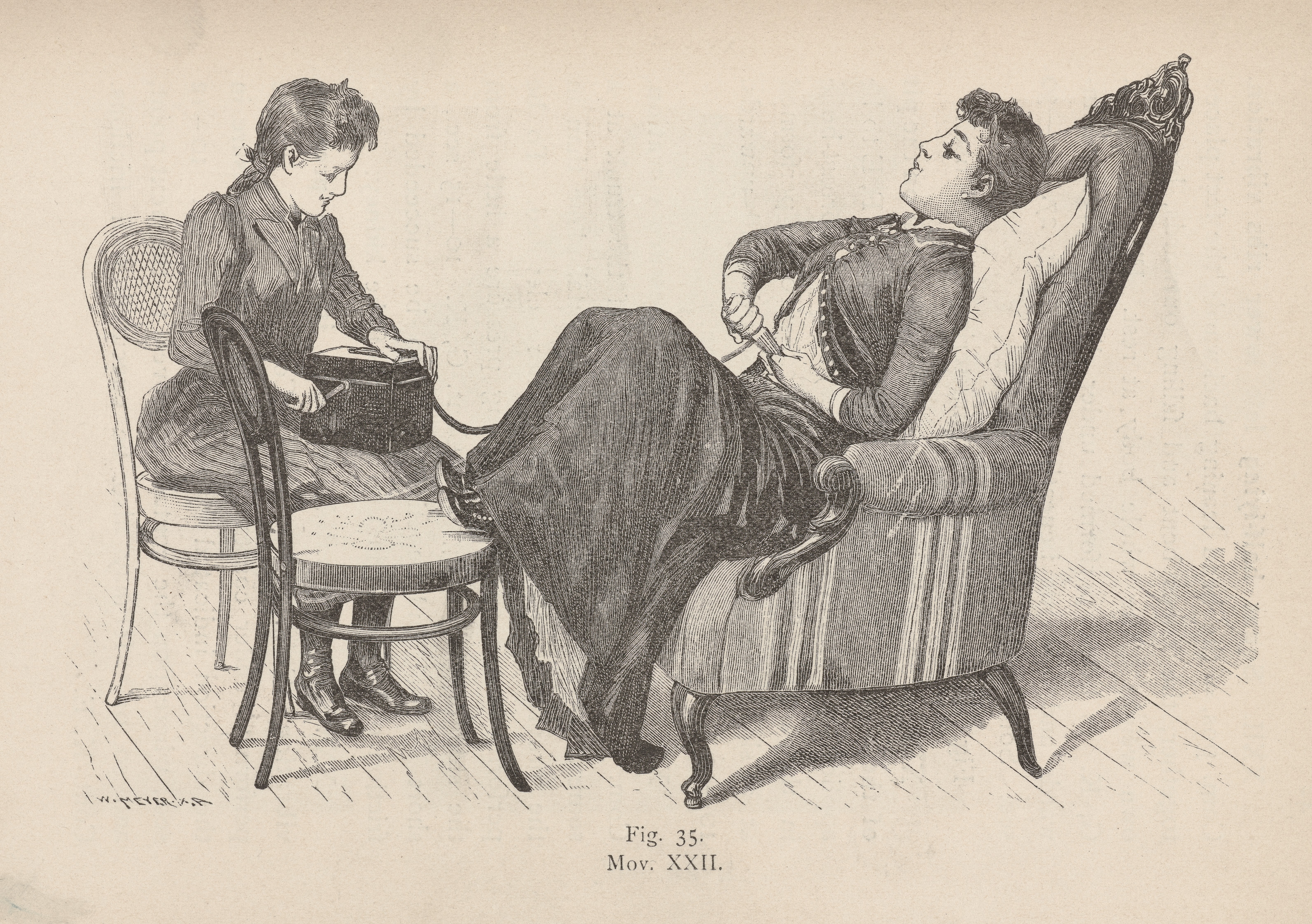
Demonstration using the vibrator by C. H. Liedbeck, 1891

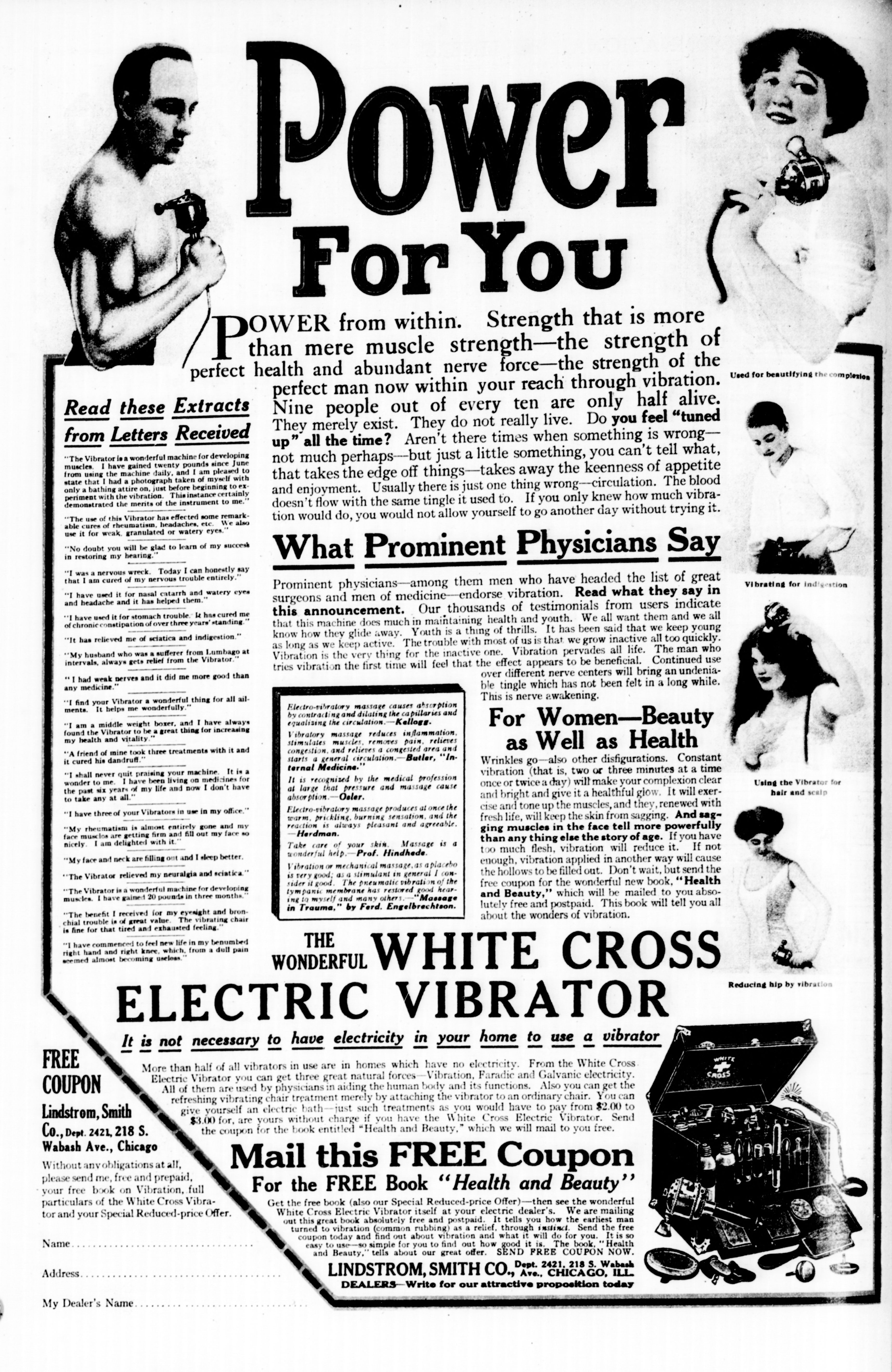
1913 White Cross advertisement

The electric vibrator was invented in the late 19th century as a medical instrument for pain relief and the treatment of various ailments. It was marketed for decades without any sexual connotations, for example, to be used against the skin for wrinkles, the scalp for headaches, or the stomach for indigestion. One account gives its first use at the Salpêtrière hospital in Paris in 1878, with Romain Vigouroux cited as the inventor. English physician and inventor Joseph Mortimer Granville, who also developed an early model, asserted his own priority in the invention and has been described as the "father of the modern electromechanical vibrator." Mortimer Granville's 1883 book Nerve-vibration and excitation as agents in the treatment of functional disorder and organic disease describes the intended use of his vibrator for purposes including pain relief and the treatment of neuralgia, neurasthenia, morbid irritability, indigestion, and constipation. These early vibrators became popular among the medical profession and were used for treating a wide variety of ailments in women and men, including hysteria, arthritis, constipation, amenorrhea, inflammations, and tumors; some wounded World War I soldiers received vibrotherapy as treatment at English and French hospitals in Serbia.

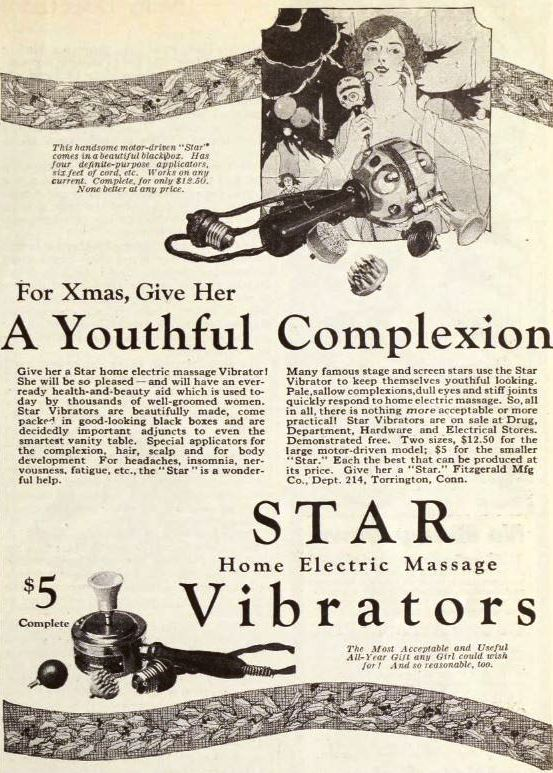
1921 advertisement

Vibrators began to be marketed for home use in magazines from around 1900, by brands such as White Cross together with other electrical household goods, for their supposed health and beauty benefits. An early example was the "Vibratile", an advertisement that appeared in McClure's magazine in March 1899, offering a cure for "Neuralgia, Headache, Wrinkles".

Mail order was the standard method of marketing vibrators between 1900 and 1920. However, in the mid-1920s, vibrators began to appear in erotic films and photography, effectively driving them out of "respectable" publications. Vibrator ads virtually disappeared until the modern vibrator resurfaced in the 1960s as a frankly sexual device.

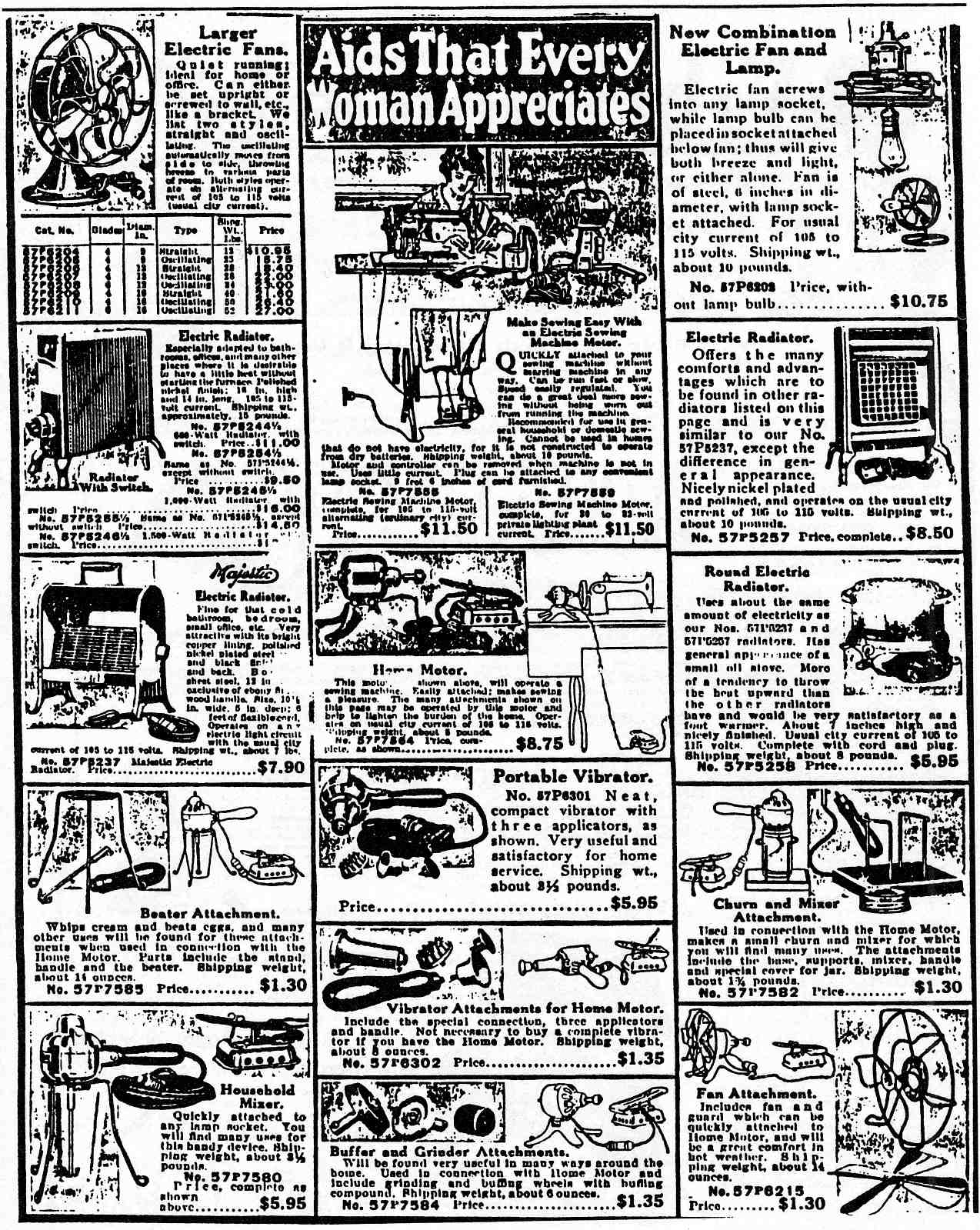
Sears, Roebuck and Company catalog, 1918

=== 1960s onwards ===
The vibrator re-emerged during the sexual revolution of the 1960s. On June 30, 1966, Jon H. Tavel applied for a patent for the "Cordless Electric Vibrator for Use on the Human Body". The cordless vibrator was patented on March 28, 1968, and was soon followed by such improvements as multi-speed and one-piece construction, which made it cheaper to manufacture and easier to clean.

As of 2013, rechargeable vibrators were beginning to be manufactured to reduce the environmental impact of battery-operated vibrators.

In 2017 Lynn Comella, associate professor of Gender Studies, noted that "sex toy packaging... has been replaced by softer and more sanitized imagery. It's now possible to buy a vibrator at many neighborhood Walgreens". The UK pharmacy Boots followed the US pharmacy's lead and since 2019 has been selling sex toys both online and in some stores.

=== Adoption ===
Research published in a 2009 issue of The Journal of Sexual Medicine demonstrates that about 53% of women in the United States ages 18 to 60 have used a vibrator. A 2010 study in the Journal of Sex & Marital Therapy found that 43.8% of heterosexual males in the United States had used vibrators. 94% of these men had done so as part of foreplay with their partner, and 82% had done so as part of sexual intercourse. Among non-heterosexual men, 49.8% have used vibrators.

=== Medical use ===
Vibrators have been found to be effective solutions for sexual dysfunctions such as erectile dysfunction, sexual arousal disorder, and pelvic pain, among others. Notable companies developing vibrators for medical use are MV.Health, Reflexonic and Intimate Rose.

=== Coronavirus effects on sex toy industry ===
As the coronavirus pandemic hit in early 2020, people found themselves at home with an abundance of extra time. This sparked an interest in discovering and exploring one's sexuality. This caused the sex toy industry to benefit from a spike in sales from customers, some of whom were buying toys in bulk for fear that the pandemic would shut down production for an uncertain amount of time. Rising interest resulted in vibrators being more mainstream and having better representation in popular culture, opening up the conversation on women's pleasure.

== Legal and ethical issues ==
The possession and sale of vibrators is illegal in some jurisdictions, including India, although they are sold online. Until recently, many American Southern and some Great Plains states banned the sale of vibrators completely, either directly or through laws regulating "obscene devices". In 2007, a federal appeals court upheld Alabama's law prohibiting the sale of sex toys. The law, the Anti-Obscenity Enforcement Act of 1998, was also upheld by the Alabama Supreme Court on September 11, 2009.

In February 2008, a US federal appeals court overturned a Texas statute banning the sales of vibrators and other sexual toys, deeming such a statute as violating the right to privacy guaranteed by the 14th Amendment to the U.S. Constitution. The appeals court cited Lawrence v. Texas, where the U.S. Supreme Court in 2003 struck down bans on consensual sex between gay couples as unconstitutionally aiming at "enforcing a public moral code by restricting private intimate conduct". Similar statutes have been struck down in Colorado and Kansas. As of 2009, Alabama is the only state where a law prohibiting the sale of sex toys remains on the books, though Alabama residents are permitted to buy sex toys with a doctor's note.

An American bioethicist and medical historian, Jacob M. Appel, has argued that sex toys are a "social good" and that the devices, which he refers to as "marital substitutes," play "an important role in the emotional lives of millions of Americans". Appel has written:

I cannot say whether more Alabama women own vibrators than own Bibles. If I were guessing, I would suspect that a majority derive more use out of the vibrators. Certainly more pleasure. Nor does there appear to be any remotely rational basis for keeping sex toys out of the hands of married adults or single adults.

== Vibrators in the LGBTQ+ community ==
Sex toys such as vibrators are used frequently in LGBTQ+ sexual relationships.

According to a paper published in 2011, a majority of men who personally identified themselves as gay or bisexual indicated that they had used at least one type of sex toy in sexual relationships as well as individually. The study indicated that 49.6% of the participants had used a vibrator. In Canada, people who use sex toys are more likely to identify as LGBTQ+. They were also more likely to report participating in alternate sexual activities, like oral sex or anal sex, which are also common situations to use sex toys, such as vibrators. Furthermore, vibrator use among American women is connected to several facets of sexual function (such as arousal, pain, and lubrication), suggesting more enjoyable sexual functions. Men in similar studies are also reported to have heightened sexual experiences while using vibrators.

Vibrators can also be used in the process of artificial insemination for LGBTQ+ people attempting to start a biological family. Newly invented vibrators such as the POPDildo cater to LGBTQ+ people, disabled people, serodiscordant couples who may need help conceiving, as well as those experiencing erectile dysfunction.

== Health risks ==
After each use, sex toys must be cleaned using unscented soap and warm water. Many products help keep vibrators clean, like specialty soaps and portable UV sterilizing cases for cleaning on the go. When sharing toys, it is especially important to keep them as sanitary as possible. Condoms can be used as a precaution to cover toys when using them on partners to prevent the spread of STIs and other infections. Physicians can offer advice on proper vibrator care and use, including sex counselors, OB/GYNs, urologists, oncologists, and specialists in conditions leading to sexual dysfunction.

== In popular culture ==
The historical fiction film Hysteria features a reworked history of the vibrator, focusing on Joseph Mortimer Granville's invention and the treatment of female hysteria through the medical administration of orgasm. Its historical accuracy has been criticized on the grounds that Granville's vibrator was for male pain relief.

In the Next Room (or The Vibrator Play) is a play by Sarah Ruhl. It concerns the early history of the vibrator, advancing the (dubious) Maines hypothesis (that doctors used it as a clinical device to bring women to orgasm as treatment for "hysteria").

In the 1980s and 1990s, vibrators became increasingly visible in mainstream public culture, especially after a landmark August 1998 episode of the HBO show Sex and the City, in which the character Charlotte becomes addicted to a rabbit vibrator. Appearing in a regular segment on the popular US television series The Oprah Winfrey Show in March 2009, Dr. Laura Berman recommended that mothers teach their 15- or 16-year-old daughters the concept of pleasure by getting them a clitoral vibrator. Today, CVS, Walgreens, Kroger, Safeway, Target, and Walmart are among major national US chain retailers that include vibrators on store shelves. Sunday Night Sex Show was a live call-in Canadian television show that ran from 1996 to 2005, in which callers could ask questions to sex educator Sue Johanson. Johanson was also featured on Late Night with Conan O'Brien, giving the audience a tour of her sex toy bag that included bullet vibrators, discreet vibrators disguised as key chains, and even a vibrating rubber ducky. In season one of Mad Men, Peggy Olson is assigned to work on the marketing campaign for a type of vibrating underwear intended to help the user lose weight called the Electrosizer, which she later renamed the Rejuvinator. The show cites this device as providing "the pleasure of a man without the man." In Grace and Frankie, which premiered in 2015, the two title characters form a business designing and selling vibrators for seniors.

=== Maines' myth of early use for female sexual stimulation ===
Historian of technology Rachel Maines, in her book The Technology of Orgasm, argued that the development of the vibrator in the late 19th century was in large part due to the need for an easier way to perform genital massage on women. Doctors would often perform the massage to cause "hysterical paroxysm" (orgasm), which was historically a treatment for the once common medical diagnosis of female hysteria.

Maines writes that this treatment had been recommended since classical antiquity in Europe – including in the Hippocratic corpus and by Galen – and continued to be used into the medieval and modern periods. The treatment was not seen as sexual by physicians due to the absence of penetration and was viewed by them as a difficult and tedious task. Maines writes that the first use of the vibrator at the Salpêtrière was on hysterical women but notes that Joseph Mortimer Granville denied that he had, or ever would have, used his invention for this purpose; additionally, Maines states that the true use of these medical vibrators, and the vibrators marketed for home use in the early 20th century, was not openly stated but proceeded under "social camouflage". One example of suggestive advertising given is a 1908 advert in National Home Journal for the Bebout hand-powered mechanical vibrator, containing the text "Gentle, soothing, invigorating, and refreshing. Invented by a woman who knows a woman's needs."

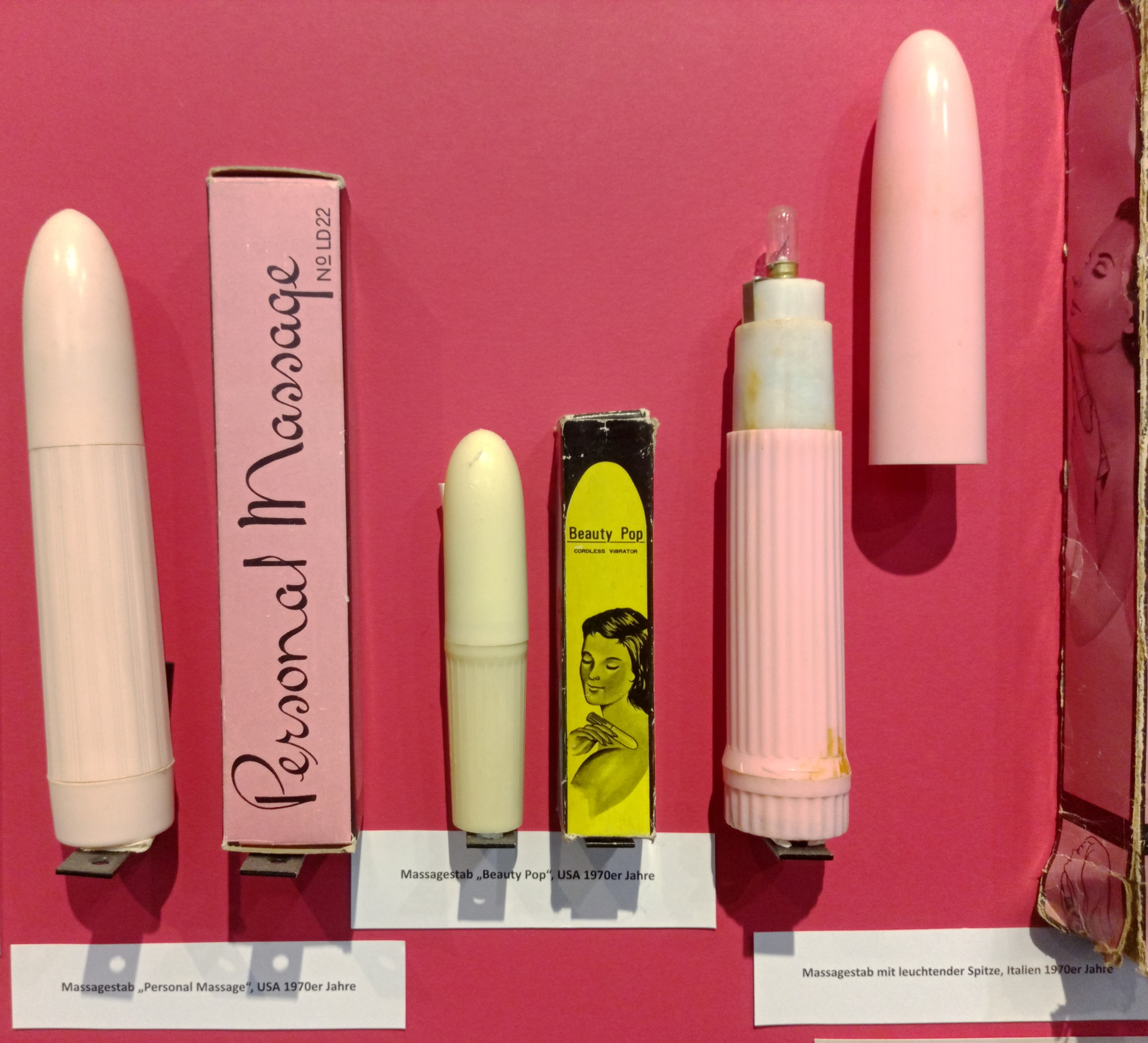
Vibrators of the 1970s

Maine's conjecture was popularized into a feature film. Historians disagree with Maines about the historical prevalence of genital massage as a treatment for female hysteria and over the extent to which early vibrating massagers were used for this purpose. Stimulation to orgasm as a standard treatment for female hysteria in ancient and medieval Europe has been disputed as a distortion of sources. The cases of this treatment in the 19th and early 20th centuries (and the use of vibrators to perform it), if performed at all, would have been confined to a limited group. Maines has said her widely reported theory should be treated as a hypothesis rather than a fact. In 2018, Hallie Lieberman and Eric Schatzberg published a peer-reviewed article that found "no evidence" to support Maines's claims in the book's citations. They called the wide acceptance of Maines's work "a fundamental failure of academic quality control". In 2020, Lieberman continued to press her case in the New York Times.

== See also ==
- Dildo
- Hysteria, film about the 1880 invention of the first vibrator
- Sex machine
- Sex shop
- Sex toy party

== Bibliography ==
- Lieberman, Hallie (2017). Buzz: A Stimulating History of the Sex Toy. Pegasus Books. ISBN 978-1-681775432.
- Maines, Rachel P. (1999). The Technology of Orgasm: "Hysteria," the Vibrator, and Women's Sexual Satisfaction. Johns Hopkins University Press. ISBN 978-0-8018-6646-3.
- Lieberman, Hallie; Schatzerg, Eric (August 2018). "A Failure of Academic Quality Control: The Technology of Orgasm" (PDF). Journal of Positive Sexuality. 4 (2): 24–47. doi:10.51681/1.421. S2CID 52839516. Archived (PDF) from the original on 15 August 2021.
- Lieberman, Hallie (23 January 2020). "(Almost) Everything You Know About the Invention of the Vibrator Is Wrong". The New York Times. Archived from the original on 24 January 2020.
- Selling Sex Toys: Marketing and the Meaning of Vibrators in Early Twentieth-Century America Archived 18 November 2018 at the Wayback Machine
