= In the Next Room (or The Vibrator Play) =

2009 play by Sarah Ruhl

- TCG Cover Art
- Original language: English
- Written by: Sarah Ruhl
- Genre: Comedy; Drama; Problem play
- Setting: A prosperous spa town outside of New York City. The dawn of the age of electricity, and after the Civil War.

Premiere
- Date: 5 February 2009
- Place: Berkeley Repertory Theatre; Berkeley, California
- Official website

In the Next Room (or The Vibrator Play) is a 2009 play by Sarah Ruhl, published by Samuel French. It concerns the early history of the vibrator, when doctors used it as a clinical device to bring women to orgasm as treatment for "hysteria." Other themes include Victorian ignorance of female sexual desire, motherhood, breastfeeding, and jealousy. The play was nominated for three 2010 Tony Awards.

== List of characters ==
- Catherine Givings – wife of Dr. Givings and mother to Letitia, a woman in her late twenties and full of life, but sexually frustrated with her marriage.
- Dr. Givings – Catherine's husband, a man in his forties and a specialist in gynecological and hysterical disorders.
- Sabrina Daldry – Dr. Givings' patient, a pianist in her early thirties struggling with hysteria and infertility.
- Leo Irving – Another patient of Dr. Givings', an English artist in his twenties or thirties.
- Annie – Dr. Givings' midwife assistant, a woman in her late thirties.
- Elizabeth – An African-American woman, house keeper for the Daldrys, and later wet nurse for the Givings, in her early thirties.
- Dick Daldry – Sabrina Daldry's husband, a man in his forties or fifties.

== Plot summary ==
=== Act One ===
Dr. Givings, an electrical scientist, lives with his wife, Catherine, and their newborn, Letitia, in upstate New York during the late 19th century. With the recent innovation of electricity entering American homes, Givings harnesses it to create a machine designed to cure female hysteria by inducing "paroxysms" - innocently giving birth to the vibrator. He treats his patients in an operating theater within his house, the eponymous "next room," alongside his assistant and midwife, Annie. While he believes his wife to be physically strained from an excess of milk that is insufficient to feed their child, Catherine is sexually dissatisfied with her husband, who is fascinated by electricity and struggles with intimacy.

In late November, the doctor brings in a new patient, Sabrina Daldry, and her husband, Dick, who has grown frustrated with the inhibitions arising from his wife's hysteria. While Givings treats Sabrina with the vibrator, Mr. Daldry and Catherine romp in the rain, and when he returns, he is delighted to see that there is a considerable difference in Sabrina's health. Catherine inadvertently reveals her struggle with nursing Letitia, and Mr. Daldry suggests hiring their housekeeper, Elizabeth, an African-American woman, as a wet nurse, as she recently lost her son to cholera. In the privacy of their home, the Givings' discuss Catherine's anxieties about bringing in a stranger to nurse Letitia.

The next day, Dr. Givings gives Elizabeth a medical exam, determining she will be a healthy wet nurse. Catherine observes her feeding the baby and reacts emotionally; she tries to explain to her husband about her insecurities of motherhood, but Dr. Givings is more interested in medicating Mrs. Daldry with another round of electrical therapy in the next room. With his assistant absent, however, Sabrina has a much more difficult time reaching a paroxysm, and after he attempts to stimulate her with higher voltage, a power outage occurs. Annie arrives and administers manual treatment to Sabrina, causing her to ejaculate, while Dr. Givings works to restore power in the house. Elizabeth prepares to return home to her own family and is asked by Catherine if she plans to have more children, before divulging her own personal fears of childbirth and the great pain she felt when Letitia first tried to nurse off of her. Meanwhile, Annie displays her knowledge of Greek philosophy to Mrs. Daldry, who asks her to begin teaching it to her in private lessons.

When everyone has left, the Givings' endeavor to be sexually intimate in the living room, but are interrupted by Mrs. Daldry, who has come back to retrieve her hat and is seemingly faint. The doctor resolves to treat her with the vibrator, much to his wife's chagrin, but when Annie's absence gives her trouble reaching a paroxysm once again, he successfully uses what he refers to as "vulvular massage" in addition to the instrument. Catherine, who has been eavesdropping at the door, demands that her husband conduct electrical therapy on herself, but he denounces the idea as unseemly and unprofessional. Mrs. Daldry leaves again, and Dr. Givings, growing suspicious of his wife, locks the operating theater before leaving to attend a club of scientific academics.

Sabrina returns to the Givings' home a third time, this time to retrieve her gloves, and describes to an intrigued Catherine the sensations of the vibrator. Curiosity gets the better of her, and she picks the lock to her husband's laboratory, finally laying eyes on the instrument. Mrs. Daldry offers to stimulate Mrs. Givings with the device, but she has an intensely negative reaction to it. She offers to conduct the therapy to Sabrina, and despite her insistence that Dr. Givings should be the only one to take such responsibility, she takes the offer, the curtain falling as Mrs. Daldry has her third paroxysm of the day.

=== Act Two ===
It has been two weeks since Catherine and Sabrina's adventure with the vibrator and Dr. Givings is seeing a new patient - Leo Irving, a rare case of male hysteria. Leo, a painter, recounts the source of his hysterical symptoms, which he believes to be a heartbreak he suffered from a woman he fell in love with in Florence. Dr. Givings unveils his latest invention, specifically designed to medicate hysteria in a man; a device that inserts into the anus, which he refers to as the "Chattanooga Vibrator". Meanwhile, in the living room, Catherine struggles to connect with her baby, who was previously smiling and attentive for Elizabeth. After a quick and successful session, Leo meets Catherine on his way out, charming her with his old-fashioned tendencies and shared preference for candlelight over electric lamps. She then converses with Sabrina about continuing to explore the vibrator on their own accord behind her husband's back, but their plans are interrupted by the doctor, who brings her into the operating theater for therapy.

Mr. Irving returns to the Givings', having forgotten his scarf, and becomes enamored with Elizabeth upon meeting her. He insists he must paint her nursing Letitia, creating a post-Civil War Madonna, and after generous offers for payment, she tepidly agrees, but only if Catherine sits in the room during the painting to make it feel not so improper. Mr. Daldry arrives to escort Elizabeth and his wife back to their home, and with everyone gone, Catherine discloses to her husband concerns with retaining Elizabeth's employment, for fear of her getting too attached to Letitia. Their conversation quickly turns to an argument as Catherine claims she is mentally unwell and begs to be treated in the next room, and Dr. Givings postulates it is because of the excess of milk. Reluctantly, he agrees to medicate her with the vibrator.

In the operating theater, Dr. Givings attempts to conduct therapy with his wife as he would with any other patient, but the experiment quickly turns sexual as Catherine insists they kiss while he holds the instrument to her person. Frustrated when he refuses to do so, she dresses herself to leave, recounting as she does so how when she first met the doctor as a young girl, she wrote her name in the snow outside his window in the hopes he would notice her. She flees the house in a fury while Dr. Givings, in a creative stir, summons Annie to help him draft plans for a vibrator made of water, designed to treat more excitable patients such as his wife.

Catherine reappears with Leo after running into him during the first snowfall of the season, and openly flirts with him, much to his discomfort. She requests that he show her where her husband placed the vibrator in their session earlier, and as she places her hand on his cheek, Dr. Givings enters from the operating theater. Mr. Irving, embarrassed, makes his exit quickly, and Mrs. Givings presses the doctor about whether he is jealous over her hand being on his cheek; he claims that, because of the many shades and degrees of love, the moment was irrelevant and unimportant. Catherine, hurt, reveals she was hoping he would be envious, further straining their relationship.

A week passes, and Leo has been regularly painting a nursing Elizabeth while also rebuffing Catherine's romantic advances. One day, Dr. Givings returns home to bear witness to the painting and hides his repulsion with the scene. He quickly administers electrical therapy with Leo and proclaims he is cured, allowing them to stop the treatments permanently. Later in the day, Mr. and Mrs. Daldry arrive for Sabrina's treatment. Catherine and Sabrina distract Dick by sending him into the Givings' winter garden, while they discuss with Elizabeth the odd, dichotomous sensations of the vibrator. Elizabeth, confused, believes it to be the result of sexual relations with their husbands, but Mrs. Daldry claims that such feelings during sex would be incredibly embarrassing - her husband is always careful to silently make love to her in complete darkness. Mr. Irving leaves the Givings' home apparently cured, and walks an uncomfortable Elizabeth back to her apartment.

Sabrina is taken into the operating theater for therapy as her husband returns from the garden. While she is unsuccessfully massaged with the device, Mr. Daldry advances on Catherine to kiss her, and she audibly slaps him and has him take a carriage home. Annie offers to wield the instrument as the treatment has taken longer than usual, and Dr. Givings uses it as an excuse to confront his wife about the slap he heard from the living room. Before leaving for the club, he subtly implies his speculation that she has been unfaithful with the men in her life. In the next room, Mrs. Daldry and Annie begin a Greek lesson following their success with the vibrator. Sabrina asks why she is unmarried, and, as Thales said to his mother, she woke up one day and found it to be too late. Before her exit, Mrs. Daldry plays the piano alone in the living room; Annie arrives and, after she finishes the song, kisses her passionately. Overwhelmed, Sabrina leaves and states it would be best if they stopped seeing each other.

Catherine answers the doorbell to find Elizabeth has returned, who resigns from her role as a wet nurse, as her husband needs her at home to help with their other children. When Catherine muses how she would die of sorrow should her baby die, an impassioned Elizabeth explains that at first she felt great resentment to Letitia for taking the milk that was meant for her dead son, but when she saw how grateful she was for it, it was hard to believe the feeling to be anything but love. Before leaving, she urges Catherine to hold Letitia close and remember the blood of her son that kept her alive. The doorbell rings again, and Leo arrives to say goodbye, as he is moving to Paris. Catherine begs him to take her with him, explaining how he has seduced her in his talk of beauty and sex, but Mr. Irving confesses he is in love with Elizabeth, who rejected his feelings earlier in the evening when he walked her home. Catherine makes a final appeal by disclosing her loneliness, but he dismisses her affections, reminding her that she cannot feel so isolated when she belongs to a family that loves her.

Leo leaves, and Catherine, more alone than ever, tries to use the vibrator on herself but still feels nothing pleasurable. Dr. Givings returns to the house and is alarmed to see her using the instrument, but he soon admits his jealousy when she concedes that she has fallen in love with Leo. Catherine then confronts him regarding his intentions for their relationship; to love her and indulge her longing for pleasure, or to merely be a doctor and make her feel better. The doctor admits that he would like to love her but does not know how, and, in medical jargon, lists and kisses her most beautiful facial features. Touched by his vulnerability, Catherine leads him to the garden, and the two undress and make snow angels with their bare bodies. The curtain falls as Catherine climbs atop her husband and mounts him, discovering the woman on top sex position, allowing her at last sexual satisfaction.

== Staging ==
The set is divided between two rooms, a parlor and a doctor's office. At the play's climax, the actors step through the imaginary wall dividing the rooms to create the third and final scene, outdoors in the falling snow.

== Background ==
In the Director Presentation Les Waters states the play was inspired by The Technology of Orgasm: Hysteria, the Vibrator, and Women’s Sexual Satisfaction by Rachel P. Maines. Ruhl cites Maines's book, AC/DC: The Savage Tale of the First Standards War (Tom McNichol) and A Social History of Wet Nursing in America (Janet Golden) as books she was reading or which influenced her when she wrote the play.

The play was commissioned by the Berkeley Repertory Theatre, which received an Edgerton Foundation New American Play Award towards the production of the play. Les Waters, associate artistic director said, in part: "This award provides us with the rare luxury of an extended rehearsal period for a new play. Sarah has become one of the country's most important writers, and I'm honored that Berkeley Rep has played a vital role in her career."

== Productions ==
The play premiered at the Berkeley Repertory Theatre on 5 February 2009, running to 15 March 2009, under the direction of Les Waters. The Broadway production, presented by the Lincoln Center Theater, began previews at the Lyceum Theatre on 22 October 2009, officially opened on 19 November and closed on 10 January 2010 after 60 total performances. The cast included Laura Benanti, Michael Cerveris, Quincy Tyler Bernstine, Maria Dizzia, Thomas Jay Ryan, Wendy Rich Stetson, and Chandler Williams. This production was nominated for three Tony Awards.

=== Professional productions ===
Subsequent professional productions include: August 23 to September 19, 2010 at Woolly Mammoth Theatre Company in Washington, DC. Directed by Aaron Posner.

- In October and November 2010, the play was produced by The Actors Theatre, directed by Matthew Wiener at Herberger Theatre's Stage West in Phoenix, Arizona. The cast starred Francis Jue as Dr. Givings and Angelica Howland as Mrs. Givings.
- In March–April 2011, the play had its Australian premiere by the Sydney Theatre Company, directed by Pamela Rabe in the Drama Theatre, Sydney Opera House. The production, starring Jacqueline McKenzie, subsequently transferred to Melbourne Theatre Company, and was nominated for several Green Room Awards, including Best Director (Rabe), Best Female Actor (McKenzie), and Best Production.
- In July–August 2011, the play was produced by A Contemporary Theater (ACT) in Seattle, Washington, directed by Kurt Beattie.
- In September–October 2011, the play was produced by the Theatre Workshop of Nantucket (TWN), directed by Anne Breeding, and by the Playmaker's Repertory Company in Chapel Hill, North Carolina, directed by Vivienne Benesch.
- In late 2011, the play was produced by Plan 9 in Larco Theatre in Lima, Peru, directed by David Carrillo.
- In March–April 2012, the play was produced by Auckland Theatre Company Auckland, New Zealand, directed by Colin McColl.
- In June–July 2012, the play was produced by Fortune Theatre, Dunedin, New Zealand, directed by Lara Macgregor.
- In April–May 2013, the play was produced by the Santa Paula Theater Center, directed by James Castle Stevens.
- In May 2013, the play was produced by the Colonial Players of Annapolis, Maryland, directed by Carol Youmans
- From November 2013 to January 2014, a production directed by Laurence Boswell ran in the St. James Theatre, London.
- In October 2014, the play was produced by the Hobart Repertory Theatre Society, directed by Steven Jones, in Tasmania, Australia.
- In October 2017, the play was produced at The Timeline Theatre Company in Chicago, directed by Mechelle Moe. The cast included Anish Jethmalani as Dr. Givings, Rochelle Therrien as Catherine Givings, Melissa Canciller as Mrs. Daldry, Joel Ewing as Mr. Daldry, Krystel McNeil as Elizabeth, Dana Tretta as Annie, and Edgar Miguel Sanchez as Leo Irving. Playwright Sarah Ruhl attended the show.
- In October–November 2018, the play was produced by Black Swan State Theatre Company, directed by Jeffrey Jay Fowler.

== Awards and nominations ==
The play garnered three 2010 Tony Award nominations:

- Best Play
- Best Featured Actress in a Play – Maria Dizzia
- Best Costume Design of a Play – David Zinn

The play was nominated for the 2010 Drama Desk Award for Outstanding Costume Design.
