= National Stamping & Electric Works =

Manufacturer of kerosene and electric appliances

- Founded: Chicago, Illinois, United States (1897)
- Fate: Purchased by Eureka (company)
- Successor: Eureka (company), Midea Group
- Headquarters: United States
- Products: Kerosene and electrical appliances

National Stamping & Electric Works was a company founded in Chicago in 1897 by Frank Kohlhase. The company manufactured kerosene lamps and irons as well as electrical appliances, until being acquired in 1948 by the Eureka-Williams Corporation absorbed in 1951. Originally called The National Stamping Works; Electric was added to the name in 1903. In 1922, the business expanded and they built a new headquarters.

== White Cross ==
White Cross was a brand of household electrical products sold starting in 1907. The brand was first used by the Lindstrom, Smith Company. The Lindstrom, Smith Company was a manufacturer of electrical appliances in the early 1900s located in Chicago. The company first started advertising their products in 1907, and was bought out by the National Stamping & Electric Works in 1921, which continued the use of the White Cross brand name until the 1950s. White Cross is notable for being one of the earliest brands of Vibrator, which they advertised mainly as a medical device, but sold with "applicators" for many purposes.
