= Eureka (company) =

Vacuum cleaner manufacturer

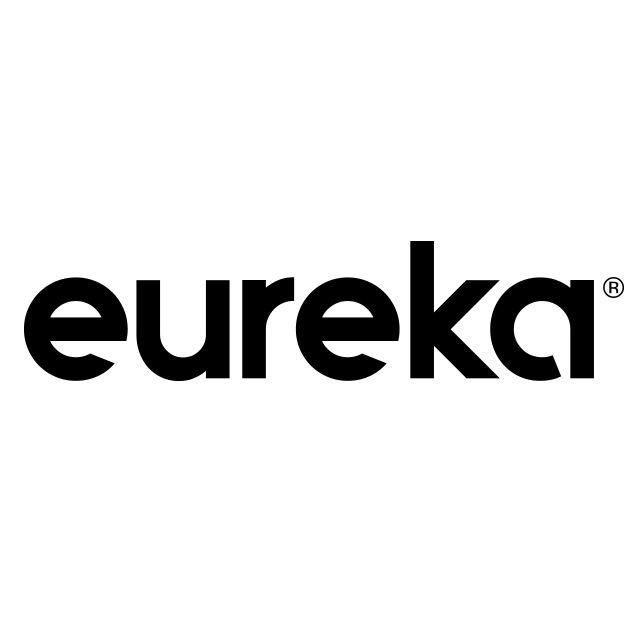
- Type: Division
- Industry: Home appliances
- Genre: Home care
- Founded: 1909; 117 years ago (as Eureka Vacuum Cleaner Company); Detroit, Michigan, U.S.
- Founder: Fred Wardell
- Headquarters: Parsippany, New Jersey, U.S.
- Products: Cordless vacuums, upright vacuums, stick vacs
- Owner: Midea Group
- Parent: Electrolux (1974–2016); Midea Group (2016–present)
- Website: www.eureka.com us.eureka.com

Eureka is an American home appliances brand owned by Chinese company Midea Group that manufactures vacuum cleaners, including uprights, cordless, canisters, sticks and handhelds. Eureka also manufactures aftermarket vacuum accessories, such as bags, belts and filters.

Eureka was one of the earliest vacuum cleaner manufacturers in North America. It was owned by Electrolux from 1974 until 2016 when it was sold to Midea Group.

== History ==
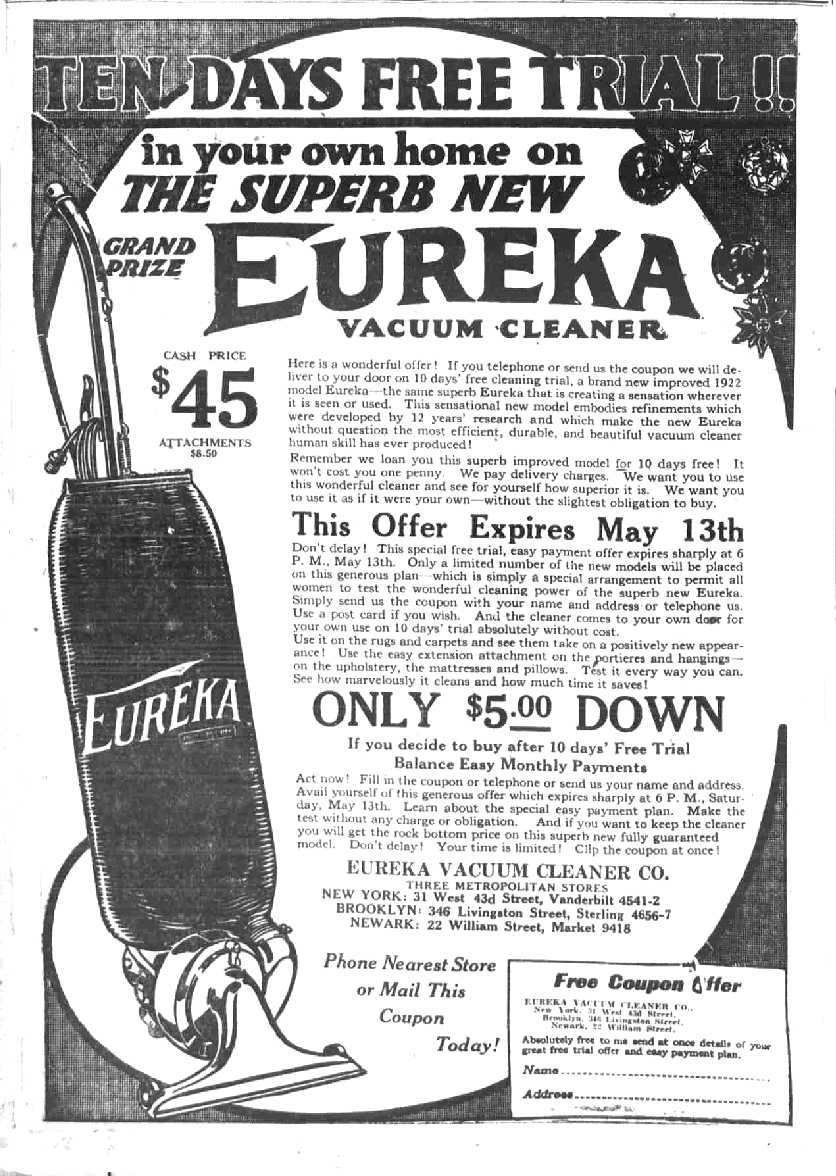
1922 Eureka Model 9 vacuum ad, offering a 10-day home trial of the product

Eureka Vacuum Cleaner Company was founded in 1909 in Detroit, Mich. by Toronto, Canada-born real estate auctioneer Fred Wardell (1866–1952) to sell vacuum cleaners for which he had acquired several patents. At first only selling vacuum cleaners manufactured by others, in 1913 he and four partners purchased their first plant. In 1922, they introduced the Eureka Model 9, which undercut their main competitor Hoover by 50% in price, with the same horsepower motor and a front-mounted bag that customers preferred to Hoover's rear-mounted bag, offered with a 10-day home trial, becoming the Model T of the vacuum cleaner industry, selling 1 million units in three years. The advertisement shows the price was $45 ($866 in 2025 dollars). By 1927 Eureka sold 2 million units, selling one-third of all vacuums manufactured in the United States and settling into a perennial second-place position behind Hoover.

In 1930, we saw an expansion into the making of other appliances with the introduction of the Eureka electric range.

Partly due to the costs of a massive door-to-door sales force, along with the Great Depression, in the late 1930s the company went into the red, divesting its door-to-door force in 1940, and still operating in the red until it was saved only by World War II and a wartime production business.

In 1945, looking to get into the booming postwar appliance industry, the company merged with Williams Oil-O-Matic, a Bloomington, Ill., manufacturer (founded 1918) of oil-based heaters and refrigerators for the home, and the name of the company was changed to Eureka-Williams Corporation.

The company went on to expand its horizons, eventually manufacturing such diverse items as heaters, air conditioners, a wooden lung, and school furniture, and acquiring the National Stamping & Electric Works along with their White Cross brand.

In 1953, it was purchased by Henney Motor Company of Freeport, Illinois, and in 1959 it became a division of National Union Electric Corporation, going on to become the first U.S. manufacturer of a purpose-built electric car (1959–1961), the Henney Kilowatt, which flopped commercially.

In 1974, Eureka was purchased by AB Electrolux of Sweden and the name was changed back to the Eureka Company. In 2004 the Eureka Company name was discontinued and replaced with Electrolux Home Products Division, although the brand name was still used. In August 2011, Electrolux Small Appliances North America relocated to Charlotte, N.C., from Bloomington, Illinois, uniting the corporate office operations and support functions for all of Electrolux's North American vacuum, small appliance, and major appliance brands under one roof.

In 2016, Eureka was purchased by Chinese company Midea Group, parent company of Midea America Corp.

== Products ==
As of 2026, Eureka's U.S. lineup includes robot vacuums, wet/dry cleaners, stick vacuums, uprights, and canisters sold through its official website.
