= Hugh Dancy =

English actor (born 1975)

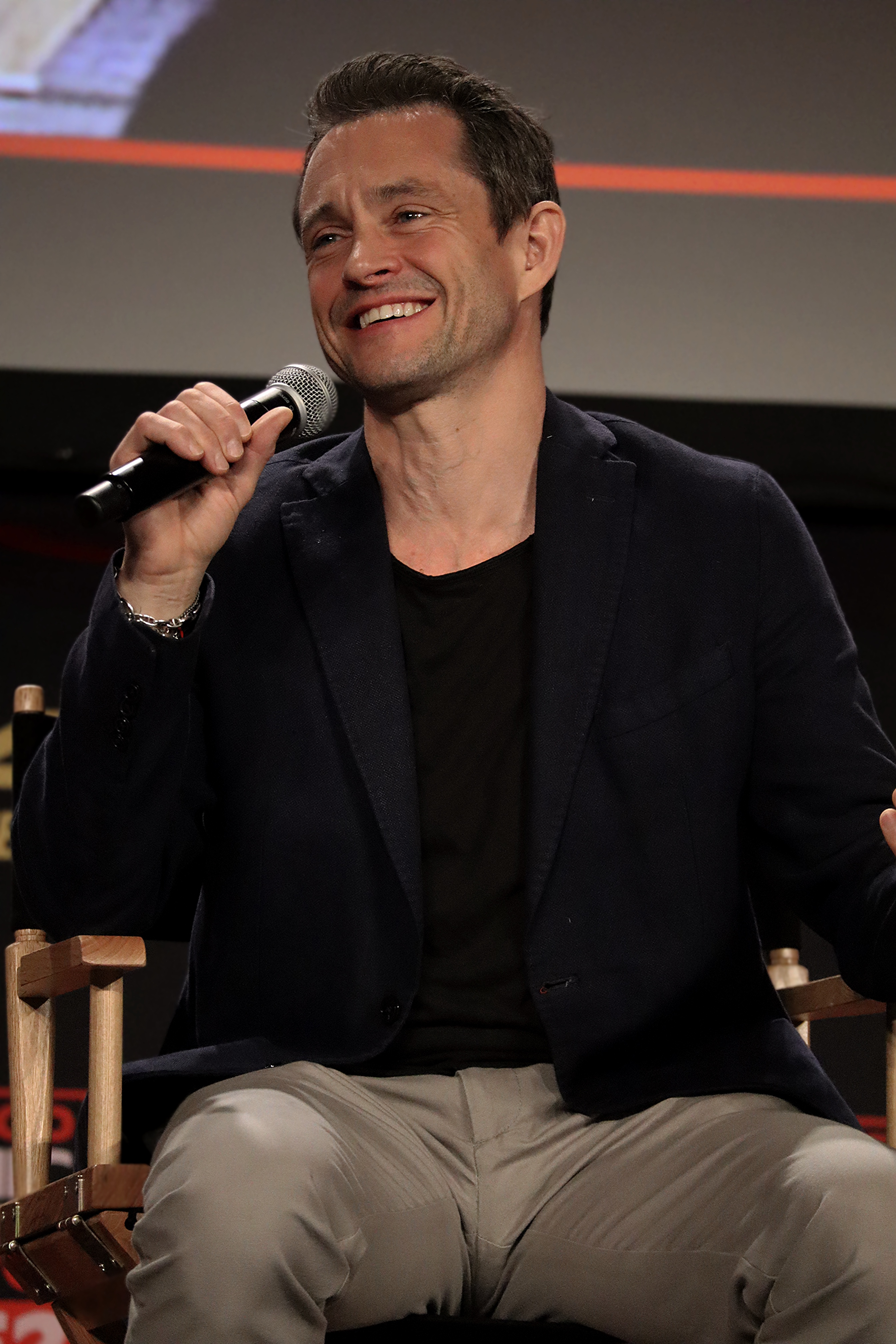
- Dancy at C2E2 2024
- Born: Hugh Michael Horace Dancy; 19 June 1975 (age 51); Stoke-on-Trent, Staffordshire, England
- Education: St Peter's College, Oxford
- Occupation: Actor
- Years active: 1998–present
- Spouse: Claire Danes (m. 2009)
- Children: 3
- Father: Jonathan Dancy

Hugh Michael Horace Dancy (born 19 June 1975) is an English actor. Known for his charismatic leading man roles on stage and screen across various genres including historical dramas, romantic comedies, action films, and psychological thrillers. He has been nominated for several accolades including two Critics' Choice Awards, a Drama Desk Award and a Primetime Emmy Award.

Dancy rose to prominence for his role as the title character in the television film adaptation of David Copperfield (2000) and made his feature film debut in the epic war drama film Black Hawk Down (2001). He then starred in the romantic comedy films Ella Enchanted (2004), The Jane Austen Book Club (2007), Confessions of a Shopaholic (2009), and Hysteria (2011), the romantic dramas The Sleeping Dictionary (2003), Evening (2007), Adam (2009), and the drama films King Arthur (2004), Shooting Dogs (2005), and Martha Marcy May Marlene (2011).

On television, he portrayed Robert Devereux, 2nd Earl of Essex, in the HBO miniseries Elizabeth I (2005) which earned him a nomination for a Primetime Emmy Award. He gained notoriety for his roles as criminal profiler Will Graham in the NBC television series Hannibal (2013–2015), Cal Roberts in the Hulu original series The Path (2016–2018), and Senior Assistant District Attorney Nolan Price on the NBC revival Law & Order (2022–present). He has also had recurring guest roles on The Big C (2011), Homeland (2020), and The Good Fight (2020–2021).

== Early life, family and education ==
Dancy was born in Stoke-on-Trent, Staffordshire, and raised in Newcastle-under-Lyme. His mother, Sarah Ann Dancy (née Birley, born 1952), works in academic publishing. His father is philosophy professor Jonathan Dancy (born 1946), who teaches at the University of Reading and at the University of Texas at Austin. Hugh is the oldest of three children, followed by brother Jack Dancy (born 1977), who is co-director of the travel company Trufflepig Travel, and sister Katharine Sarah Redman (née Dancy, born 1980), who works for UNESCO.

From age 5–10, Dancy was educated at Edenhurst Preparatory School in Newcastle-under-Lyme. At age 10, Dancy attended boarding school at the Dragon School in Oxford, then, at 13 at Winchester College. At age 18, he acted in the Winchester College Players production of Twelfth Night, which was performed in both Winchester and at the Minack Theatre in Cornwall. He went on to earn an English Literature degree at St Peter's College, Oxford.

== Career ==
=== 1998–2009: Early roles and Hollywood leading man ===
After graduation, Dancy moved to London, where a chance conversation in a cafe led to his meeting casting director Ros Hubbard and agent Dallas Smith, who signed him. In 1999, Dancy appeared in the second series of Cold Feet in the role of Danny, who had a fleeting romance with Rachel, one of the show's main characters. In 2002, Dancy played Daniel Deronda in the BBC's adaptation of George Eliot's novel Daniel Deronda.

Notable roles from film include Dancy's Prince Charmont from the 2004 film Ella Enchanted alongside Anne Hathaway and, from the same year, Galahad in King Arthur alongside later Hannibal co-star Mads Mikkelsen. In 2005, he starred as Adam Raki in Adam, an independent film which premiered at the Sundance Film Festival in 2009 and follows the story of a young man diagnosed with autism. He went on to appear in various other films.

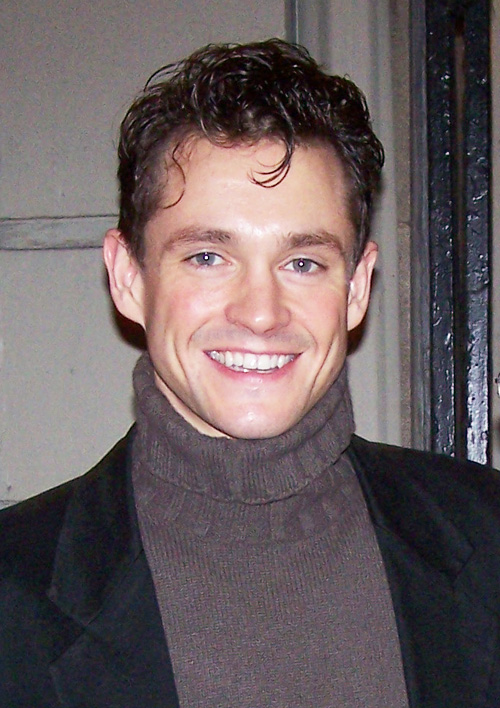
Dancy in 2007

In theatre, Dancy has appeared in MCC Theater's The Pride, written by Alexi Kaye Campbell, at the Lucille Lortel Theatre in New York City. The off-Broadway production was directed by Joe Mantello and co-starred Ben Whishaw and Andrea Riseborough. In 2007, Dancy had a starring role on Broadway as Captain Dennis Stanhope in Journey's End (Belasco Theatre).

=== 2010–2019: Work on stage and Hannibal ===
From 2010 until 2011, he starred in Manhattan Theatre Club's Broadway production of Venus in Fur alongside Nina Arianda. His performance was praised by The New York Times theatre critic Charles Isherwood. In August 2018, it was announced he would appear with Stockard Channing in Roundabout Theatre Company's off-Broadway premiere of Apologia, written by Alexi Kay Campbell, in the dual roles of Peter and Simon.

In March 2012, NBC announced that Dancy had been cast as Will Graham in Hannibal, the television adaptation based on the main character of Thomas Harris' 1981 novel Red Dragon. The show received critical acclaim and was nominated for numerous awards. It was cancelled after three seasons and concluded in 2015, though there are hopes for its revival. From 2016 to 2018, he appeared for three seasons as Cal Roberts, a lead character in Hulu's The Path, alongside Aaron Paul and Michelle Monaghan.

=== 2020–present: Law & Order and other roles ===
In November 2021 Dancy was announced as one of the leads in NBC's 2022 revival of Law & Order, playing an assistant district attorney.

== Personal life ==
From 1997, Dancy dated British artist Annie Morris, before the two parted ways after roughly a decade.

In 2006, Dancy met American actress Claire Danes on the set of Evening. They announced their engagement in February 2009 and married in France later that year. They have three children: two sons born in 2012 and 2018, and a daughter born in 2023. The couple live in the West Village neighborhood of New York City.

== Acting credits ==
=== Film ===
Year	Title	Role	Notes
2001	Black Hawk Down	SFC Kurt Schmid	
2001	Young Blades	D'Artagnan	
2003	Tempo	Jack Ganzer	
2003	The Sleeping Dictionary	John Truscott	
2004	King Arthur	Galahad	
2004	Ella Enchanted	Prince Charmont	
2005	Shooting Dogs	Joe Connor	
2006	Basic Instinct 2: Risk Addiction	Adam Towers	
2007	The Jane Austen Book Club	Grigg Harris	
2007	Evening	Buddy Wittenborn	
2007	Savage Grace	Sam Green	
2007	Blood & Chocolate	Aiden	
2009	Confessions of a Shopaholic	Luke Brandon	
2009	Adam	Adam Raki	
2010	Coach	Nick	Direct-to-DVD
2010	The Wildest Dream	Andrew Irvine	Voice; Documentary
2011	Our Idiot Brother	Christian	
2011	Martha Marcy May Marlene	Ted	
2011	Hysteria	Dr. Mortimer Granville	
2013	Legends of Oz: Dorothy's Return	Marshal Mallow	Voice
2013	Poe	Edgar Allan Poe	Voice
2018	Joseph Pulitzer: Voice of the People	Alleyne Ireland	
2019	Late Night	Charlie Fain	
2022	Downton Abbey: A New Era	Jack Barber	
TBA	The Custom of the Country †		Filming

=== Television ===
Year	Title	Role	Notes
1998	Trial & Retribution	Robert Belini	2 episodes
1998	The New Adventures of Robin Hood	Kyle	Episode: "Orphans"
1998–1999	Dangerfield	Charlie Paige	2 episodes
1999	Cold Feet	Danny	2 episodes
1999	Kavanagh QC	Michael Woodley	Episode: "The More Loving One"
2000	Relic Hunter	Michael Previn	Episode: "The Last Knight"
2000	David Copperfield	David Copperfield	Television film
2000	Madame Bovary	Leon	Television film
2002	Daniel Deronda	Daniel Deronda	4 episodes
2005	Elizabeth I	Earl of Essex	2 episodes
2011	The Big C	Lee Fallon	8 episodes
2013–2015	Hannibal	Will Graham	38 episodes; Main role
2015	Deadline Gallipoli	Ellis Ashmead Bartlett	2 episodes
2016, 2018	Robot Chicken	Various voices	2 episodes
2016–2018	The Path	Cal Roberts	36 episodes; Main role; Also producer
2020	Homeland	John Zabel	6 episodes
2020–2021	The Good Fight	Caleb Garlin	4 episodes
2021	The Abominable Snow Baby	Albert (voice)	Television film
2022	Roar	Detective Bobby Bronson	Episode: "The Woman Who Solved Her Own Murder"
2022–present	Law & Order	EADA Nolan Price	87 episodes; Main role
2025	Your Friendly Neighborhood Spider-Man	Otto Octavius	Voice; 5 episodes
2025–2026	Law & Order: Special Victims Unit	EADA Nolan Price	3 episodes
2025	The American Revolution	John Murray / Lord Cornwallis	Voice; 6 episodes

=== Theatre ===
Year	Title	Role	Venue	Notes
1999	Billy and the Crab Lady	Fred	Soho Theatre	London
2000	To the Green Fields Beyond	Mo	Donmar Warehouse	London
2007	Journey's End	Captain Dennis Stanhope	Belasco Theatre	Broadway
2010	The Pride	Philip	Lucille Lortel Theatre	Off-Broadway
2011–2012	Venus in Fur	Thomas Novachek	Lyceum Theatre	Broadway
2018	Apologia	Peter / Simon	Laura Pels Theater	Off-Broadway

== Awards and nominations ==
Award	Year	Category	Work	Result	Ref.
Critics' Choice Television Award	2014	Best Actor in a Drama Series	Hannibal	Nominated	
Critics' Choice Television Award	2016	Best Actor in a Drama Series	Hannibal	Nominated	
Drama Desk Award	2012	Outstanding Actor in a Play	Venus in Fur	Nominated	
Fangoria Chainsaw Award	2015	Best TV Actor	Hanniball	Nominated	
Fangoria Chainsaw Award	2016	Best TV Actor	Hanniball	Nominated	
Gotham Independent Film Awards	2011	Best Ensemble Performance	Martha Marcy May Marlene	Nominated	
IGN Summer Movie Award	2013	Best TV Actor	Hannibal	Nominated	
iHorror Award	2016	Best Male Performance – Horror Series	Hannibal	Nominated	
Online Film and Television Awards	2006	Best Supporting Actor in a Motion Picture or Miniseries	Elizabeth I	Nominated	
Outer Critics Circle Awards	2019	Outstanding Featured Actor in a Play	Apologia	Nominated	
Primetime Emmy Awards	2006	Outstanding Supporting Actor in a Miniseries or a Movie	Elizabeth I	Nominated	
Satellite Awards	2006	Best Actor in a Miniseries or a Motion Picture Made for Television	Elizabeth I	Nominated	
Satellite Awards	2009	Best Actor in a Motion Picture, Drama	Adam	Nominated	
Saturn Awards	2014	Best Actor on Television	Hannibal	Nominated	
Saturn Awards	2015	Best Actor on Television	Hannibal	Won	
Logie Awards	2016	Most Outstanding Actor	Deadline Gallipoli	Nominated	
