= Vapours (mental condition) =

Archaic term for certain mental and/or physical illnesses

In archaic usage, the vapours (or vapors) is a mental, psychological, or physical state, such as hysteria, mania, clinical depression, bipolar disorder, lightheadedness, fainting, flush, withdrawal syndrome, mood swings, or PMS in which a sufferer loses mental focus. Ascribed primarily to women and thought to be caused by internal emanations (vapours) from the womb, it was related to the concept of female hysteria. The word "vapours" was subsequently used to describe a depressed or hysterical nervous condition.

Before the Victorian era, a variety of conditions which affected women were referred to as "a case of the vapours". A Treatise of Vapours or Hysterick Fits, by John Purcell, published in 1707, describes the various conditions described as "vapours", with treatments.

A description of someone having "a case of the vapours" was sometimes used for a person in a state of emotional agitation.

== See also ==
- Smelling salts
- Spleen § Society and culture
