= Frederick Hollick =

American physician

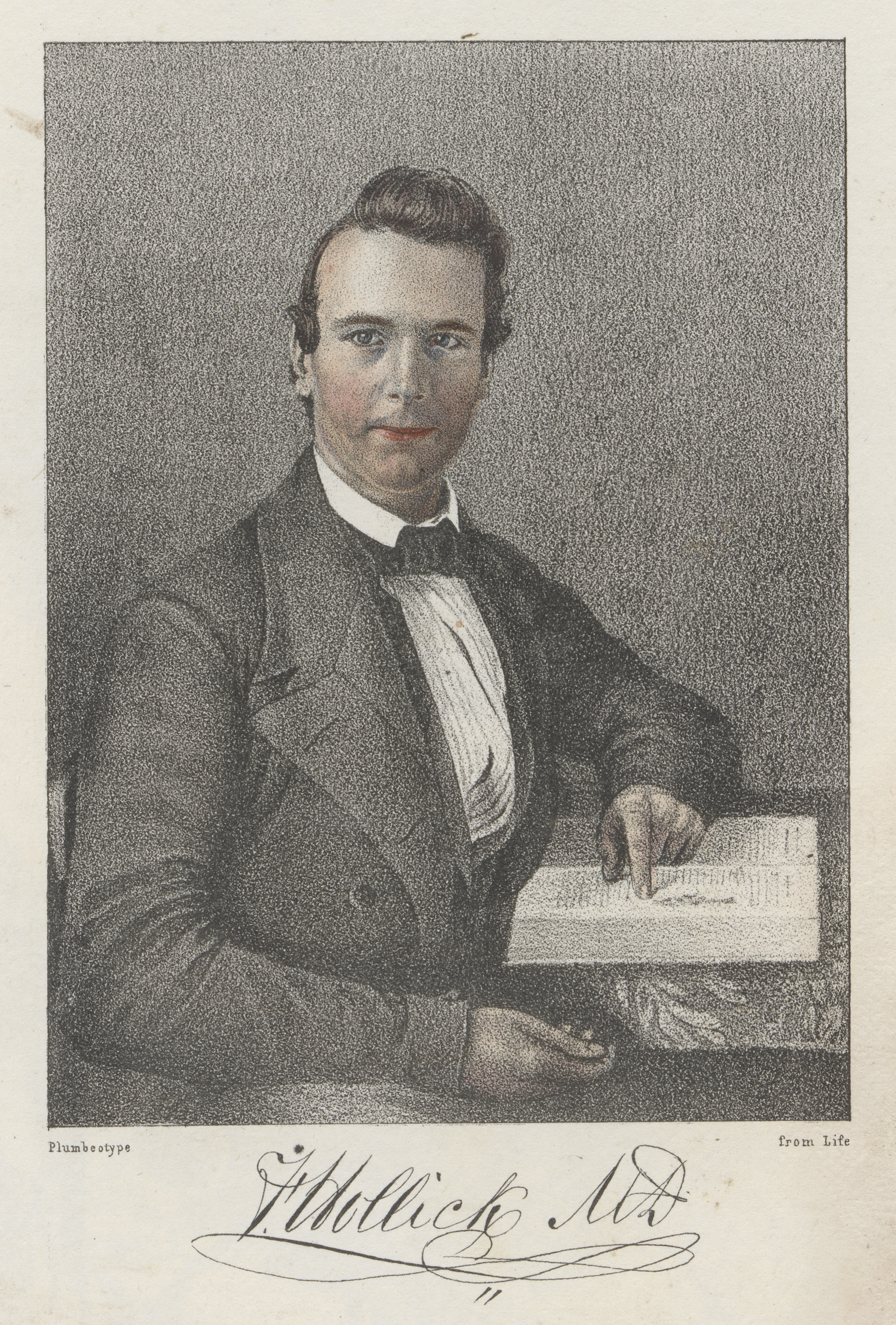
- Dr. Hollick by John Plumbe, Jr., 1847
- Born: 1818
- Died: 1900 (aged 81–82)

Frederick Hollick (1818-1900) was a 19th-century American physician, sex educator, and author. His most notable works include The Origin of Life and The Marriage Guide, both of which focus on teaching healthy sexual practices and behavior, as well as proper knowledge of the reproductive processes and management of diseases. Hollick's beliefs were controversial for the time period since many health professionals at this time were against discussing sex and functions of the human body in a public sphere.

== Teachings ==
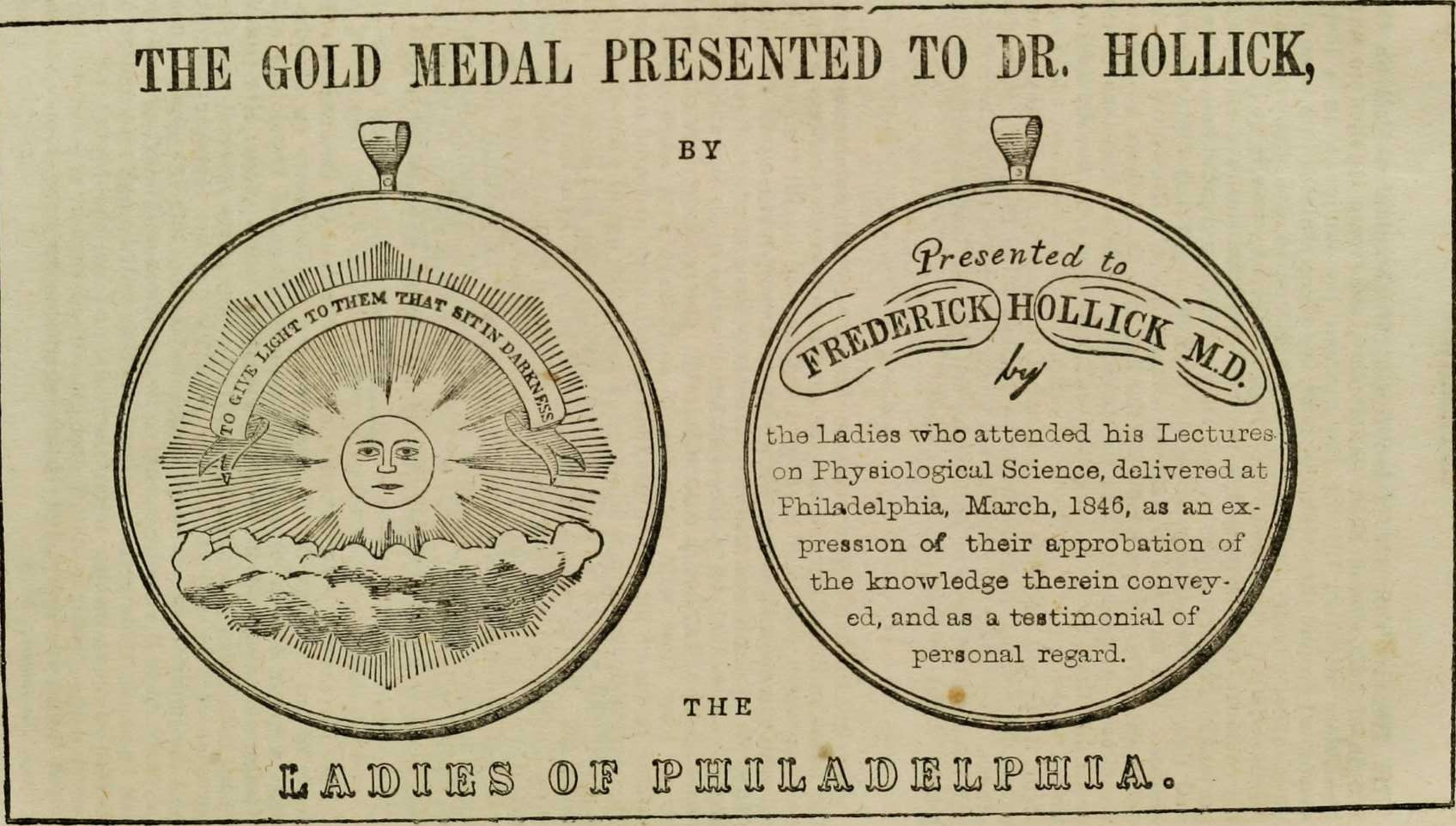
An award given to Frederick Hollick by the Ladies Association of Philadelphia in appreciation of his frank lectures

Unlike other doctors during the mid-19th century, Hollick's mission was to bring sexual health and sex education to the public. He was determined to educate society about the proper anatomical functions of the human body in relation to sexual pleasure. He strongly believed it was of the utmost importance that humans knew all they could about human generation, a subject highly neglected and only newly understood by the medical community, and that it was unhealthy for people to be ignorant of their sexual awareness. Prior to the release of his 1860 health manual The Marriage Guide, which openly discussed such things as the benefits of aphrodisiacs, legal prostitution, and multiple orgasms in females, people were rarely exposed to such information. Instead, they relied primarily on the private education they received from their family doctor, many of whom were adamant about not relaying such scandalous beliefs. Hollick was critical of the medical industry's attitude towards sex, claiming that doctors left it as a "professional mystery".

Much to his peers' dismay, Hollick went beyond writing sexual health manuals by holding frequent lectures and demonstrations in Philadelphia to spread his beliefs. Using a papier-mâché recreation of the female body as a guide, Hollick taught audiences where female sexual organs were located and how they should properly be used during sex. Although audiences were initially shocked at seeing such a lifelike representation of a naked woman, many women were grateful for such an informational display at a time when female sexual pleasure was deemed non-existent and little knowledge of how female sexual organs function was actually known. In addition, Hollick advocated heavily for the physiological necessity of sex in consenting adults, regardless of marital status. He insisted that sex was an organic expression of human nature, citing the act as "...the highest and most absorbing excitement that animated beings can experience". While his lectures created a fairly large following, they also garnered an even greater opposition.

=== Controversial beliefs ===
Despite the myriad of praise from newly informed audiences and liberated women on the acceptance and naturalness of sex, several of Hollick's personal opinions were still quite conservative, mirroring those of other doctors in his field. Firm opposition toward masturbation, homosexuality, celibacy, and interracial relations was upheld by Hollick, practices which he deemed "unhealthful" and even physiologically dangerous. The consequences from engaging in such behavior ranged from impotence in men to venereal diseases and even death—fortunately all of which Hollick knew cures for. Some of his "home remedies" for impotence, for instance, included the use of Cannabis indica (marijuana), a deep tissue groin massage/shampoo, or a suctioning machine of Hollick's own creation, which he claimed was able to bring back an erection to any dysfunctional man.

== Obscenity trials ==
Although several of Hollick's views merited similarities among his colleagues, it was not enough to sway them into approving of his overall methodology. Thus, beginning in 1846, Hollick was condemned by his Antebellum peers to multiple charges of obscenity, leading to two trials, the second of which he failed to show up for. The charges insisted that both Hollick's papier-mâché mannequin and the distribution of anatomically correct diagrams of sex organs were obscene, edging on pornographic. However, the first charges were eventually dropped due to witnesses dismissal of the mannequin as obscene, but rather informational, which only reaffirmed the widely held belief that Hollick's teachings provided a fresh, welcoming view of sex. Even though charges still remained against Hollick, the rising support by his followers pushed him to forfeit the bail, leave Philadelphia behind, and begin a new life in New York to share his teachings with receptive audiences alike. There is little information about what happened to Doctor Hollick after he fled the district court's charges against him, other than his death in 1900, and his permanent influence on views about sex throughout the 19th century.

== Sources ==
- Gardella, Peter (1985). Innocent Ecstasy : How Christianity Gave America an Ethic of Sexual Pleasure. Oxford University Press. ISBN 978-0-1953-6515-3.
- Haynes, April (2012). Obscenity, Sex Education, and Medical Democracy in the Antebellum United States American Sexual Histories. 2nd ed. West Sussex. Blackwell.
