= Rachel Maines =

American scholar (born 1950)

Rachel Pearl Maines
- Born: July 8, 1950 (age 76); Brookline, Massachusetts, U.S.
- Education: University of Pittsburgh (BA); Carnegie Mellon University (PhD)
- Known for: Writings on the history of technology

Rachel Pearl Maines (born July 8, 1950) is an American scholar specializing in the history of technology. Since 2015 she has been a visiting scientist at Cornell University's School of Electrical and Computer Engineering. Her book The Technology of Orgasm won the American Historical Association's Herbert Feis Award. The book was also the inspiration for the film Hysteria and the play In the Next Room. However, one of the main claims of the book has been debunked as false.

== Early life and career ==
Maines was born in Brookline, Massachusetts, and received her BA in classics with a specialization in ancient science and technology from the University of Pittsburgh in 1971. She received her PhD in applied history and social science from Carnegie Mellon University in 1983 with a doctoral dissertation entitled Textiles for Defense: Emergency Policy for Textiles and Apparel in the Twentieth Century. Much of her early scholarship centered on the history of textiles and needlework. She was one of the founders of the Center for the History of American Needlework in Pittsburgh.

She is married to Garrel S. Pottinger, PhD, a retired professor of philosophy, with whom she has written several books. They have a daughter, Rachel Amanda Pottinger of Acme, Washington.

== Vibrator research ==
=== Publications ===
While researching needlework in late 19th- and early 20th-century women's magazines, Maines encountered what she would argue were highly circumspect advertisements for vibrators. The advertisements, she claimed, showed women using the electrical devices to massage their necks and backs but the accompanying text described the devices as "thrilling, invigorating" and promised that "all the penetrating pleasures of youth will throb in you again". Maines recalled in a 1999 interview, "I kept thinking to myself, this can't be what I think it is."

She then began researching and writing articles on the history of vibrators, the first one for the newsletter of the Bakken Museum of Electricity in Life. According to Maines, the article caused her to lose her post as assistant professor at Clarkson University in 1986 because the university was convinced that the nature of her research would drive away benefactors and alumni donors, though no evidence was presented to substantiate this claim. Three years later she submitted a more detailed article, "Socially Camouflaged Technologies: The Case of the Electromechanical Vibrator", to Society and Technology, the magazine of the IEEE Society on Social Implications of Technology. Initially, the IEEE thought the article was a joke perpetrated by the magazine's editors and that there was no such person as Rachel Maines. However, after checking all the internal citations and Maines's own background, the IEEE finally allowed the article to be published in the June 1989 edition of the magazine. Her book-length treatment of the subject, The Technology of Orgasm, was published in 1998 by Johns Hopkins University Press. Subtitled "Hysteria," the Vibrator, and Women's Sexual Satisfaction, it won the American Historical Association's Herbert Feis Award and was the inspiration for Sarah Ruhl's 2009 play In the Next Room and Tanya Wexler's 2011 film Hysteria. The book also formed the basis for Passion & Power, a 2007 documentary by Emiko Omori and Wendy Slick.

=== Controversy ===
Many of Maines's claims in The Technology of Orgasm have been challenged, notably by classicist Helen King and researchers at the Wellcome Collection. In 2012, King's article on Maines's misuse of classical material was awarded the Barbara McManus Prize of the Women's Classical Caucus.

A central claim in Maines's book—that Victorian physicians routinely used electromechanical vibrators to stimulate female patients to orgasm as a treatment for hysteria—was challenged by Hallie Lieberman and Eric Schatzberg of the Georgia Institute of Technology. Lieberman and Schatzberg failed to find references to this practice in Maines's sources. In January 2020, Lieberman wrote an op-ed in The New York Times which drew further attention to Maines' role in promoting the latter widespread myth as fact.

In an interview from 2018, Maines stated, "I never claimed to have evidence that this was really the case. What I said was that this was an interesting hypothesis, and as [Lieberman] points out—correctly, I think—people fell all over it. It was ripe to be turned into mythology somehow. I didn't intend it that way, but boy, people sure took it, ran with it."

== Other research ==
Maines's next book, Asbestos and Fire: Technological Trade-offs and the Body at Risk, was published by Rutgers University Press in 2005. She returned to the subject of needlework and textiles in Hedonizing Technologies published by Johns Hopkins University Press in 2009. The book traces the evolution of fiber arts from an industry to a hobby. Since 2015 Maines has been a visiting scientist at Cornell University's School of Electrical and Computer Engineering.
