= Hallie Lieberman =

American writer

Hallie Lieberman is an American writer and a sex and gender historian. Her first book, Buzz: The Stimulating History of the Sex Toy (2017) traces the history of sex toys in the USA from the 1950s to the present. Lieberman teaches science and technology journalism at the Georgia Institute of Technology.

== Life and education ==
While studying for her Master's in Advertising from the University of Texas, Austin, Lieberman threw home "passion parties" in 2004-2005 wherein she sold sex toys that were, at the time, illegal in Texas. Curious about the history of such legislation, Lieberman enrolled in the University of Wisconsin-Madison’s Mass Communications Doctoral Program, and studied the history of sex toys for her PhD dissertation (2014).

=== Some of her findings ===
- Lieberman disputes the theory that Victorian doctors used vibrators to cure women’s hysteria. Lieberman traced the theory back to Rachel Maines’ The Technology of Orgasm, and while agreeing that sources do back up claims that Victorian doctors used vibrators to treat upwards of 300 different diseases (hysteria being one of them), none of the diseases were cured by vibrators. On this same note, Lieberman also argues that Victorian vibrators were penetrative in purpose, and did not appear to be targeting clitoris stimulation. As such, her findings showed these vibrators were used for men and women: there is documentation of the vibrators being used to treat impotence in men due to documented rectal attachments. Lieberman found that the vibrators were more likely used for relief of menstrual cramps than for anything related to hysteria, and that this myth is primarily rooted in a sexual fantasy. In 2018, with Eric Schatzberg, she published a further article challenging more of Maines' claims, in particular that massage to orgasm was ever a staple of medical practice.
- The earliest sex toys were made of bone, ivory, teeth and have been traced back 30,000 years.
- Lieberman also researches the double standards of legislation surrounding sex toy legislation. One of her studies highlighted that sex toys (which are mostly marketed to women and gay men) are illegal to sell in Alabama, and until 2008 they were illegal to sell in Texas whereas Viagra is covered by prescription and penis pumps are sold as medical devices.
- Lieberman's research also highlights notable inventors in the field. One of whom is Gosnell Duncan, who is paraplegic, and invented the silicone dildo to assist those with disabilities experience pleasure.
- Recorded that in the 1800s in China, glass dildos were hollowed out and filled with warm liquids to simulate ejaculation.
- Analyzes the narratives around advertisements for sex toys. Lieberman traced that sex toys have symbolized radical gay sex and gay rights and also been marketed to further conservative values.
