= We-Vibe =

Canadian sex toy brand

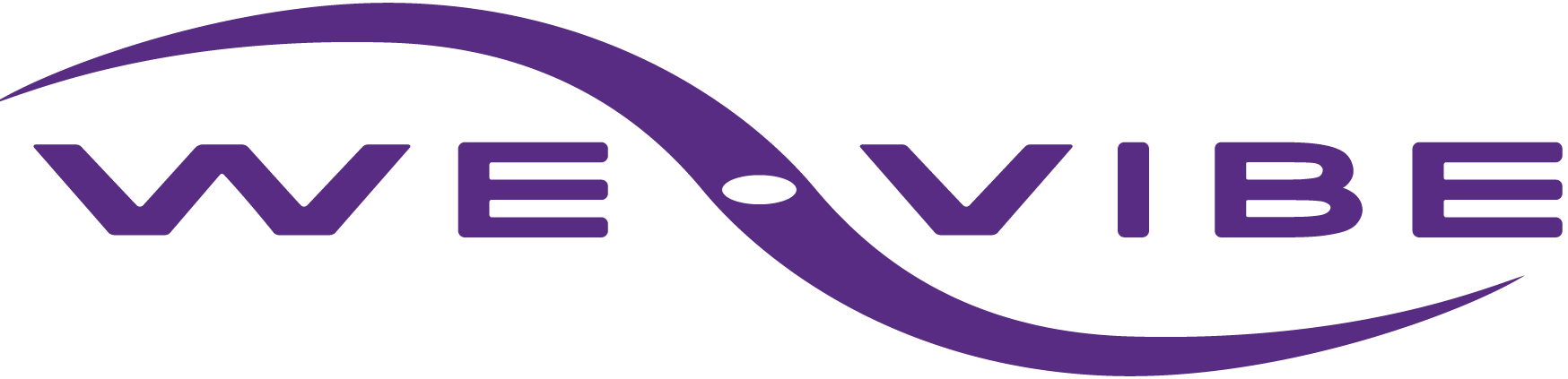
- Type: Private
- Industry: Consumer electronics
- Founded: 2003
- Founders: Bruce and Melody Murison
- Headquarters: Ottawa, Ontario, Canada
- Products: Sex toys
- Parent: Standard Innovation
- Website: we-vibe.com

We-Vibe is a brand of sex toys manufactured by Standard Innovation, a company founded by a Canadian couple in 2003. It is one of Canada's largest producers of adult toys. The company has sold millions of devices since the launch of its first vibrator in 2008. It has been the recipient of over twenty awards including the best couples sex toy at the Sexual Health Expo in Los Angeles.

== History ==
We-Vibe was created by Standard Innovation, a Canadian company founded by the married couple Bruce and Melody Murison. Bruce Murison previously worked in the semiconductor and manufacturing industries. Both were former employees of the telecommunications company Nortel, which went bankrupt. They started Standard Innovation in 2003 but did not publicize what the company was working on until the launch of the first product in 2008. The company released the first We-Vibe couple's vibrator, a small U or C-shaped device designed to be worn by a woman during sex and over the pubic bone, with one end inserted vaginally and the other end resting against the clitoris. Soon after, the company gained the endorsement of Sue Johanson, a Canadian sex educator, and Mehmet Oz, a surgeon and host of the talk show The Dr. Oz Show.

In 2009, We-Vibe was recognized as the best-selling toy at Venus Award in Berlin, Germany. Since its release, the brand has seen significant popularity and sales. Adult toy experts believe this may be due to the brand's mainstream consumer marketing strategy, product design, and discrete packaging. The product has also gained popularity among celebrities. On several occasions, We-Vibe products have been added to "Oscar bags" given to guests attending the Academy Awards. At the 2012 Super Bowl in Miami, We-Vibe products were given as gifts to notable guests.

Standard Innovation has used legal means in an attempt to protect its intellectual property. In early 2012, the company filed a complaint with the United States International Trade Commission (USITC) against LELO and others for infringing on Standard Innovation's patent for the adult toys designed to be worn while a couple has sex. The two companies settled the patent disputes in 2016.

In 2014, We-Vibe released a new iteration of the company's couples vibrator, the We-Vibe 4 Plus. In addition to the remote control included in previous models, this version featured a Bluetooth-enabled vibrator with mobile app connectivity features. For the first time, the company's products could be controlled by a partner over long distances and from anywhere in the world where a user can access an internet-connected smartphone device. In January 2015, the We-Vibe 4 Plus was awarded the best couples sex toy at the Sexual Health Expo in Los Angeles. By 2015, We-Vibe had sold nearly 4 million couples vibrators.

In 2016, two hackers reported that the app was collecting data on its use. Following the revelations, a lawsuit was filed against the company, claiming the app violated its users' privacy. In March 2017, the company agreed to a settlement of approximately US$3.2 million, resulting in up to US$127 for each claimant.

In 2018, We-Vibe merged with Womanizer.

== See also ==
- Teledildonics
- SexTech
- Lelo
- OhMiBod
- Lovense
- Lovehoney
