= Virtual reality sex =

VR technology

Virtual reality sex (VR sex) is a technology that allows the user to receive tactile sensations from remote participants, or fictional characters through the use of computer-controlled sex toys. Usually the user also wears a virtual reality headset so they can see and interact with the partner.

== Examples ==
=== BKK Cybersex Cup ===
The BKK Cybersex Cup consists of a virtual reality headset and masturbation cup. It also comes with a mobile app which allows the users to customize their own 3D girlfriend based on their preferred body, skin tone, hairstyle and outfit. The masturbation cup has a built in motion sensor which is capable of simulating the movement and transmission of the action via Bluetooth to any smartphone that runs the 3D girlfriend app.

=== VirtuaDolls ===
The American company Eos created the VirtuaDolls which consists of a silicone sheath into which a man inserts his penis. In concert with a mechanized gripper for “intelligent stroke movement”, this allows for the VirtuaDolls controller to sync up the sensation to the action. For immersive experience, it also comes with six interchangeable sleeves with different textures to allow for varying sensations and contains a pressure sensor that determines the occupant's position within the sheath. An optional vacuum attachment adds suction capabilities and an easy-clean system. The VirtuaDolls controller is also bundled with a video game titled Girls of Arcadia in which users carry out missions to rescue girls and are rewarded by the end of the missions in having sex with them. In January 2016, the company launched an Indiegogo campaign to raise funds for the product, but after being swamped with orders, the creators suspended the campaign. In February 2016, it was relaunched on Indiegogo.

=== VR pornography and interactive sex toys ===
Virtual reality pornography is a niche that is starting to get traction. According to the statistics published on VRSelector, in 2020, in conjunction with virtual reality porn only 3.2% of users use sex toys (Teledildonics like Fleshlight products). Adult streaming websites officials are noticing an uptrend for interactive sex toys use on their platform and are expecting this to keep growing. With the past pandemic of the world, virtual reality sex saw a noticeable increase in users.

There are also many (27%) VR headset owners that do not know that they can sync teledildonics with adult VR content. Another aspect that is keeping this industry from exploding, as regular 2D porn, is that the prices of virtual reality headsets and interactive sex toys are quite high for the average consumer.

== See also ==
- Virtual reality
- Immersion
- Virtual sex
- Cybersex
- Haptic technology
- Sex robot
- Teledildonics
- Simulacrum
- OhMiBod
- stripchat.com
