= Teledildonics =

Integration of telepresence with sexual activity

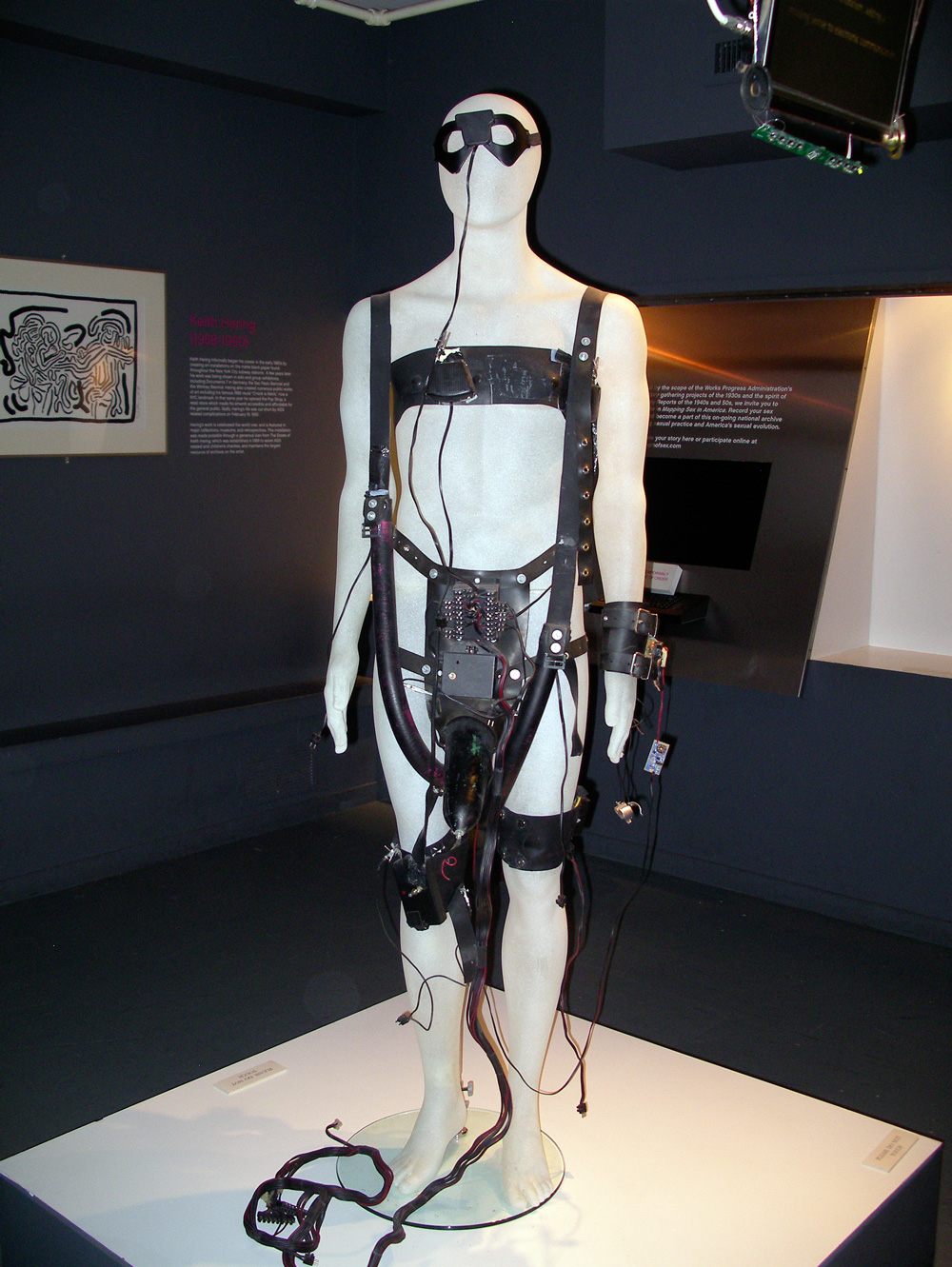
A teledildonics suit in the Museum of Sex in New York.

Teledildonics, also referred to as cyberdildonics or technodildonics, is a term used to describe virtual sexual encounters that involve the use of networked electronic sex toys to replicate and expand human sexual interactions. The term became known after technology critic and writer Howard Rheingold used it in his 1991 book Virtual Reality. In the publication, Rheingold advanced futuristic conclusions and summaries concerning technology and employed the term 'teledildonics' to refer to remote sexual activity using technology. Nowadays, the term is commonly used to describe remote sex (or, at least, remote mutual masturbation), where tactile sensations are communicated over a remote connection between the participants. The term can also refer to the integration of telepresence with sexual activity that these interfaces make possible. It can be used in conjunction or interchangeably with the term "sex-technology". The term has also been used less accurately (since there's no "tele-" element) to refer to robotic sex, i.e., computer-controlled sex toys that aim to substitute for or improve upon sex with a human partner. Nowadays, it is commonly used to refer to Bluetooth-enabled sex toys.

== Background ==
The term is commonly used to describe Bluetooth-enabled sex toys, many of which have entered the market beginning in 2003, with development of remote sexual technologies existing since the 1990s. As well as being open to a remote connection for control, some toys can also be connected with corresponding devices to deliver synchronized movements between couples and remote partners. Teledildonics have also been used within the adult industry to create 'immersive' webcam shows, whereby users control the vibrations of the webcammers sex toy. Some media outlets have reported on 'teldildonic' technology used by long-distance couples in order to maintain sexual relations.

As well as offering remote functions, many teledildonic toys can be synchronized with pornography movies. Synchronization of porn with teledildonic or Bluetooth toys actions are controlled by means of a previously written script. A report in 2008 suggested that teledildonics, along with text and email and webcams, can be used to "wind each other up to fever pitch during the working day" as a prelude to sex with a human during the evening hours. New technologies can help people establish "emotional connections" via the web. Indeed, teledildonics technology has already been integrated with adult online webcam services and certain sex toys, such as OhMiBod, Lovense, and We-Vibe. One Dutch manufacturer, KIIROO, offers a two-way connection between both female and male sex toys.

== History ==
The term was coined as early as 1975 by Ted Nelson in his book Computer Lib/Dream Machines. The idea of virtual sex has been prominent in literature, fiction and popular culture, and promoters of these devices have claimed since the 1980s they are the "next big thing" in cybersex technology. At the time Howard Rhinegold started using this term in 1990s, there were already many enthusiasts seeking to explore the power of technology, sex and intimacy. A report in the Chicago Tribune in 1993 suggested that teledildonics was "the virtual-reality technology that may one day allow people wearing special bodysuits, headgear and gloves to engage in tactile sexual relations from separate, remote locations via computers connected to phone lines." It was the same year that the Cyber-SM suit was released by Stahl Stensile, which featured on the cover of FutureSex, a 1990s San Francisco–based magazine that focused on the emergence of teledildonics. Some products have been shown at the Museum of Sex in New York City and there was an exhibition about Stensile's Cyber-SM suit in 2016.

The responses to teledildonics have been mixed; however, the dominant concern has centered on the separation of personal intimacy and embodied presence. In the words of one early text on the subject:

Indeed, pushing at the cultural-technical limits of the integrity-fragmentation contradiction can, in the short term, supercharge the disembodied body with 'sensual', transgressive ambiguity. For example, 'teledildonics', computer-simulated; sexual arousal by wearing plugged-in bodysuits, may never become widely practised, but it certainly provokes interest as a risque possibility ... [T]echno-sex contributes to hollowing out the corporeal taken-for-grantedness of which, paradoxically, it depends.

== Patent issues ==
In the past, companies experimenting in the field have been hit with patent lawsuits. In particular, U.S. Patent No. 6,368,268 titled "Method and device for interactive virtual control of sexual aids using digital computer networks", filed in 1998 and granted in 2002, effectively claimed priority over the entire field of controlling sex toys via the Internet. At the 2016 South by Southwest Festival, virtual reality entrepreneur Ela Darling asserted that patent holders were preventing the production of teledildonic technology.

The patent expired in August 2018, lowering the barrier of entry to the field.

== See also ==
- AEBN
- Arse Elektronika
- Haptic technology
- Lovense
- OhMiBod
- RealTouch
- Sarah Jamie Lewis, privacy researcher
- Sex robot
- Sex technology
- Slashdong
- Telehaptics
- Virtual reality sex
- Virtual reality pornography
