= Design 1st =

Canadian design consultancy

Design 1st is a multi-disciplinary design consultancy founded in 1996 by Kevin Bailey, and is headquartered in Ottawa, Ontario, Canada. The firm employs thirty people in Ottawa. Design 1st assists companies in multiple stages of product development – specializing in mechanical engineering, FEA, human factors, connected devices, industrial design, and manufacturability.

Design 1st has grown to become Canada's largest product design consultancy. In 2011 Design 1st won the Ottawa Center of Innovation’s (OCRI) Solution of the Year Award in recognition of their work with a variety of Canadian startup and growing technology companies.

Some of Design 1st clients include: We-Vibe, ProDrive Systems, Mytrak, Pliant (recently acquired by SanDisk), Gesturetek, BelAir Networks, Clearford Industries Inc, QNX (acquired by RIM), Stanley Healthcare and March Networks.
