= RealTouch =

Teledildonic male sexual stimulation device

The RealTouch was a first of a kind teledildonic male sexual stimulation device consisting of a sleeve fitted with "belts, jets, heating elements and other gadgetry" that fits over the penis and synchronizes sensations to a specially produced online video. It was created by AEBN in 2008. Representatives for the company demonstrated the device at the 2009 AVN Adult Entertainment Expo in Las Vegas and it was released in November 2009.

AEBN also produced a dildo with a capacitive touch sensor; the JoyStick. With these two products, it sought to offer access to interactive remote teledildonic services over the Internet through its RealTouch Interactive division.

Marketing the RealTouch had significant patent licensing costs. AEBN withdrew from the market in 2015 when it could no longer sustain the cost of producing the product.
