= List of Karin episodes =

Karin (Japanese: かりん) is a 2005 Japanese anime television series based on the manga Chibi Vampire written and illustrated by Yuna Kagesaki. Produced by J.C.Staff and directed by Shinichiro Kimura, the series aired on WOWOW from November 4, 2005, through May 12, 2006.

== Episode list ==
No.	Title	Original release date
1	"Overflowing is Embarrassing"; Transliteration: "Afurechatte hazukashii" (Japanese: あふれちゃって 恥ずかしい)	November 4, 2005
Meet Karin Maaka. Though she appears to be a normal high school girl, there is a secret about her life that she MUST keep: she's from a family of vampires. However, Karin is a backwards vampire, being fine in the sunlight. When transfer student Kenta Usui tries befriending her, another twist about Karin is revealed: her body overproduces blood, leading to nosebleeds.
2	"My Affinity is Embarrassing"; Transliteration: "Atashi no konomi wa hazukashii" (Japanese: あたしの好みは 恥ずかしい)	November 11, 2005
Karin begs Kenta to keep her nosebleeds a secret. He does so, even cleaning up her mess. Karin is left perplexed as to why her blood increases faster around him. Ren explains vampires are drawn to victims with a trait appealing to them; Ren likes stress, their mother likes lies. Karin is drawn next to (unknown to her) Kenta's mom and bites her; unfortunately, Kenta glimpses this. Karin learns her blood affinity is misery, and being around unhappy people increases her blood; thus she resolves to try making Kenta happy as possible.
3	"Happiness is Embarrassing"; Transliteration: "Shiawasette hazukashii" (Japanese: 幸せって 恥ずかしい)	November 18, 2005
Karin continues her mission to lessen Kenta's misery, making him lunches for school. However, Kenta has started putting the pieces together, almost completely convincing himself that Karin is a vampire; however, her ability to be in sunlight and the nosebleed have him second guessing.
4	"Being Exposed is Embarrassing"; Transliteration: "Barechatte hazukashii" (Japanese: バレちゃって 恥ずかしいろって 恥ずかしい)	November 25, 2005
Kenta is suspicious of Karin still. Anju tells him not to pressure "big sister" as she's a good person. When Karin's monthly blood increase nears, Anju uses the opportunity to reveal their vampiric nature to him. Despite Karin's pleas, Anju refuses to erase Kenta's memory. Karin thinks Kenta will reject her and thus force her family to move to keep their secret. However, Kenta firmly tells her that he would never tell a secret or force someone to leave their home.
5	"The Whole Family is Embarrassing"; Transliteration: "Kazoku sorotte hazukashii" (Japanese: 家族そろって 恥ずかしい)	December 2, 2005
Ren attempts to wipe Kenta's memory, but is stopped by Anju. Anju suggests the Marker family make Kenta their ally instead of erasing his memories, as he has shown acceptance of Karin's true nature and kept it a secret. Karin also learns the Usuis live right outside their misdirection barrier; even more embarrassing is Karin learns she bit Kenta's mom. Henry kidnaps Kenta for a chat, revealing Karin's "victims" are given her blood through bites; their unhappiness vanishes so long as Karin's blood is in them. Sworn to keep their existence secret, Kenta resumes life with Karin as normal.
6	"An Energetic Mother is Embarrassing"; Transliteration: "Okasan genki de hazukashii" (Japanese: 母さん元気で 恥ずかしい)	December 9, 2005
Due to Karin's blood still having an effect on her, Fumio is constantly positive; however, after numerous failed attempts to get a job, the effects of the blood fade and Fumio goes back to being depressed.
7	"Being Chased is Embarrassing"; Transliteration: "Okkakerarete hazukashii" (Japanese: 追っかけられて 恥ずかしい)	December 16, 2005
Vampire hunter Winner Sinclair transfers to Karin's school. However, the threat he poses doesn't come from his profession, but rather from the fact he is smitten with Karin and cannot take the hint she's not interested in him. Because Winner constantly follows Karin around to win her heart, Kenta intervenes.
8	"Being Discovered is Embarrassing"; Transliteration: "Mitsukachatte hazukashii" (Japanese: みつかっちゃって 恥ずかしい)	December 23, 2005
Karin has a nosebleed at school, forcing her and Kenta to hide. Because they disappeared and the puddle of blood, Winner assumes a vampire has sent a servant to take blood from them. Rallying the students to join him, Winner sets up crosses, garlic and running water to trap them; however, as Karin explains to Kenta, none of these things actually affect vampires. The teachers stop Winner and scold him, allowing Kenta and Karin to clean up the blood and replace it with paint to make seem like Winner was jumping to conclusions.
9	"Looking Back... is Embarrassing"; Transliteration: "Furikaeru... hazukashii" (Japanese: ふりかえると... 恥ずかしい)	January 6, 2006
Anju becomes more involved with helping Karin with her relationship with Kenta. However, Ren is of the opinion that Karin should just end her relationship with Kenta. At the same time, Karin looks back on her life and how things are now. Karin also notices that being around Kenta is starting to affect her differently, such as her heart racing. Running gag: Fumio constantly buys tomatoes because they're on sale; completely oblivious to the fact it's making Kenta ill.
10	"Papa is Very Embarrassing"; Transliteration: "Papa wa tottemo hazukashii" (Japanese: パパはとっても 恥ずかしい)	January 13, 2006
Due to the recent mayhem since Kenta and Winner arrived, Karin was not able to focus on her school work; as a result she fails a test. As continued failures would lead to a parent-teacher conference (which would be impossible), Karin asks Kenta to tutor her. However, Henry becomes worried about them spending time together and keeps watch on them. Karin and Kenta notice him visiting the library they study at; Karin knows her father is just concerned. After Karin had her first nosebleed, she was being rushed to a hospital; Henry braved the sunlight to rescue her. Karin later scores a 78% on her makeup test.
11	"It's Summer! It's The Pool! It's Embarrassing!"; Transliteration: "Natsu da! PUURU da! Hazukashii!" (Japanese: 夏だ!プールだ! 恥ずかしい！)	January 27, 2006
Winner gives Karin a ticket to a resort, hoping to win her heart on a date. Hoping to cure Winner of this delusion, Karin asks Maki to come with. However, all their attempts to repel Winner fail; one attempt gives Maki food poisoning. Alone, Winner reveals that he once didn't want to be a vampire hunter, until he met a girl that looked like Karin and his whole life changed; Karin realizes that Winner was the first person she bit. Due to Winner disliking his past, he gives off negativity that causes Karin to have a nosebleed. That's when Karin learns Winner is afraid of the sight of blood.
12	"Big Brother is Really Embarrassing"; Transliteration: "Yappari aniki wa hazukashii" (Japanese: やっぱり兄キは 恥ずかしい)	February 3, 2006
Much to Karin's shock, Ren is targeting Fumio as a potential victim, due to the stress her unhappiness causes; Karin plans to bite her again to repel Ren (whom she fears will do something worse as a womanizer). Karin takes another part time job for the summer, discovering Fumio also got a job at the same place. However, Karin fails to bite her due to unforeseen interruptions. Losing track of Fumio one day, Karin bumps into Kenta and begins having her blood increase faster. Kenta leads Karin to secluded spot to avoid attracting attention. However, the build up of blood turns Karin feral and she pins him to the ground, ready to bite him.
13	"To Be Targeted is Embarrassing"; Transliteration: "Mezamechatte hazukashii" (Japanese: めざめちゃって 恥ずかしい)	February 17, 2006
Karin is snapped out of feral state by Kenta saying her name and has a nosebleed. With her only weapon against Ren depleted, Karin decides to talk to him. Luckily, she catches him about to bite Fumio; however, Ren counters by asking Karin if she worries so much is because she's in love with Kenta. Henry stops Ren and takes him home along with Karin. Kenta is led to Fumio by one of Anju's bats, nonethewiser about what happened. Anju speculates, based on Fumio's past of getting fired after her male bosses harass her, that Fumio has strong pheromones men can't resist; Ren was just another victim. Frustrated, Ren agrees to leave her alone. In the meantime, Karin finally admits to herself that she loves Kenta.
14	"Just The Two of Us Till Morning is Embarrassing"; Transliteration: "Futari de asa made hazukashii" (Japanese: ふたりで朝まで 恥ずかしい)	February 24, 2006
With summer about to end, Karin realizes she didn't do her summer homework. As Henry and Ren are gone, Carera gives Karin permission to invite Maki for a sleepover to help finish the assignment. Despite the awkward welcome and poor attempts to cook dinner (as Carera refused to let Karin cook), Maki doesn't suspect anything.
15	"Elda Appears! is Embarrassing"; Transliteration: "ERUDA doujou! De hazukashii" (Japanese: エルダ登場!で 恥ずかしい)	March 3, 2006
Karin's grandmother, Elda Marker, awakens from a 16 year slumber; to her shock, Karin learns she is mirror image of Elda. Tricked into thinking Karin hasn't awoken as an adult vampire yet, Elda decides to visit the school; at the time students are staying late to set up for a festival. News reaches Karin and Kenta that students have been found unconscious, alerting them to Elda's presence. Elda attempts to bite Maki, but Karin arrives and scares her off; however, Maki is oblivious to what happened. Kenta goes looking for Karin despite being warned go hide; he runs into Elda.
16	"Elda's Love Life is Embarrassing"; Transliteration: "ERUDA no koi BANA wa hazukashii" (Japanese: エルダの恋バナは 恥ずかしい)	March 10, 2006
Elda attempts to bite Kenta, bit is stopped by Anju, who advises her to leave. Karin arrives shortly after and begins rambling in worry; Elda takes note of Karin's actions. Elda reveals to Karin that before she married Henry's father, centuries ago she fell in love with a human named Alfred, son of a vampire hunter; Elda never bit him as her blood affinity is love. However, once their love was discovered, Alfed's father attempted to burn down where they were hiding. As Elda was too weak to save them, Alfred offered his blood; unfortunately, it completely drained his love and her attacked Elda. Karin now worries about what would happen if she bit Kenta. At the same time, Elda vows to bite Kenta to spare Karin having to go through the same pain as her.
17	"Farewell Elda, is Embarrassing"; Transliteration: "Saraba ERUDA de hazukashii" (Japanese: さらばエルダで 恥ずかしい)	March 17, 2006
The school festival is in full swing. Kenta and Karin's class is working a haunted house (much to Kenta's annoyance as they use his eyes behind a screen to scare kids.) Karin is on watch for Elda, but is questioning if Kenta loves her. Elda arrives at sunset, biting a secluded student couple as a snack; their later altered behavior clues Karin in that Kenta is in trouble. Karin confronts Elda on the roof, asking her to leave Kenta alone. However Kenta arrives and Karin has a nosebleed, knocking her out. When Elda reveals she's trying to keep Karin from heartbreak, Kenta tells her no one knows what the future holds; this makes Elda remember Alfred. Winner arrives, causing them to everyone to fall off the roof; however, Elda saves them with bats. Luckily, Karin had a second nosebleed and Winner passed out due to his phobia. Elda decides to wander the human world, leaving a note behind saying there might be a way to help Karin with her status as an un-vampire.
18	"Brother's Secret is Embarrassing"; Transliteration: "Aniki no himitsu wa hazukashii" (Japanese: 兄キのヒミツは 恥ずかしい)	March 24, 2006
Karin is still thinking about how Elda told her romance with a human will only bring pain; however, her own misery is affecting her now, causing Karin to have nosebleeds whenever she's too close to Kenta. Boogie reveals a secret from Ren's past to Anju and Karin. Ren mistook an effeminate-looking boy at his school for a cross-dressing girl and due to the large amount of stress he was giving off, bit him. As it shames him, Ren never speaks about it.
19	"A Couple's Eve is Embarrassing"; Transliteration: "Futari no IBU wa hazukashii" (Japanese: ふたりのイブは 恥ずかしい)	March 31, 2006
It's Christmas time. Maki convinces Karin to get a gift for Kenta and confess her love (as she plans to do the same with Winner). Stranger, Karin finds Henry, Carera and Ren celebrating as well (as their blood affinities are more abundant during the holidays.) Kenta is also beginning to think about love; just like Karin, he remains unaware his worries are unnecessary. Kenta returns home to find Fumio with bite marks again, realizing Karin bit her. Maki's attempt fails as Winner turns her down. At the end of the episode, another vampire hunter arrived in town. Note: Unlike the manga, where both Karin and Kenta are dressed in Santa outfits to sell Christmas cakes, Karin is the only one to wear the same outfit; instead, Kenta is dressed as a reindeer.
20	"The First Time is Embarrassing"; Transliteration: "Hajimete no... hazukashii" (Japanese: はじめての... 恥ずかしい)	April 7, 2006
Anju has a dream of biting Karin, scaring her. Karin is also quitting her part-time job; Kenta also managed to ask her out. In the meantime, Maki is jealous of Karin, due to Winner rejecting her. Fearing that she's close to maturing as a vampire, Anju tries to recapture her younger days with Karin by spending more time with her. Anju runs into Maki at the park; due to Maki's jealousy, Anju bites her. Karin finds them and when Anju attempts rationalizing what she did, Karin tosses a gift she got for Anju at her. Anju later attempts to seek comfort from Boogie, but the soul inside the doll is gone. Karin gets a text from Elda, who has found a way to turn her into a real vampire.
21	"What Should I Do, This is Embarrassing"; Transliteration: "Dou sureba ii no ka hazukashi" (Japanese: どうすればいいのか 恥ずかしい)	April 14, 2006
The Marker family has received Elda's news and await her return. Anju thinks about how she gave up being in the daytime to ensure Karin's happiness with Kenta. Winner's grandfather Victor starts a plan to hunt down and exterminate the Markers; a tracker they're using detects vampires in two directions, making them split up. Winner finds Karin being harassed and ends up getting neat up so bad, the unhappiness gives Karin a nosebleed. Victor runs into Elda, revealing his tracker can find all the Markers. They fight, ending up in front of Karin and Winner, revealing Karin's true nature. Winner refuses to hurt Karin, despite Victor's insistence. Elda fights Victor to buy Karin time to escape.
22	"Being Like a Lost Child is Embarrassing"; Transliteration: "Maigo mitai ni hazukashii" (Japanese: 迷子みたいに 恥ずかしい)	April 21, 2006
Elda manages to give Victor the slip and get back home. She gives them her phone, which has the infirmation on how to turn Karin into a proper vampire. For disobeying him, Victor disowns Winner. Due to Karin wandering around all night, Ren braves the sunlight to find her; he finds Kenta, asking him to drive Karin away so she can be turned into a normal vampire. Karin visits Maki, who advises her to work things out with Kenta. Karin finds Kenta, who tells her to go through with the Markers' plan; it breaks both of their hearts.
23	"Farewell is Embarrassing"; Transliteration: "Sayonara wa hazukashii" (Japanese: サヨナラは 恥ずかしい)	April 28, 2006
Karin returns home, finding her parents crying that she's safe. Anju questions why Karin came back, knowing how much Karin and Kenta love each other. Karin surprises her family by being willing to go through with becoming a normal vampire; Elda reveals it must be done where Karin first bit someone. However, both Karin and Kenta are regretting accepting their choices. Victor attacks the Marker house with RPGs; Elda keeps him busy, buying her family escape time. Victor reveals he's after the Marker family because Alfred was his ancestor; due to the centuries the Sinclair family was ostracized, they became vampire hunters to wipe out the Markers and erase their shame. (Though as vampires are considered myths now, there's really no point to the vendetta anymore.) Victor wounds Elda, who realizes Alfred regretted hurting her. Maki runs into Winner, who reveals the truth about Karin; Maki also reveals her feelings to him. In the meantime, Kenta reflects on his time with Karin and decides to talk her out of it. Arriving at the remains of the Marker home, Kenta meets Winner; they team up and head for the lake.
24	"Together Forever is Embarrassing"; Transliteration: "Itsumo futari wa hazukashii" (Japanese: いつもふたりは 恥ずかしい)	May 12, 2006
The ceremony to turn Karin into a proper vampire begins; however, she doubts that this is the right choice. Ren blocks Kenta and Winner from interfering. Believing Karin won't be happy as a normal vampire, Anju uses her bats to bring Kenta to talk to her. However, Victor finds the family and badly wounds Carera, Henry, Ren and Anju. Karin's blood increases due to her family's misfortune, sending her into a berserk state. Kenta offers his neck to Karin; she bites him and they embrace. Karin's blood has no effect on Kenta because his love for her brought him happiness. Karin notices her blood is increasing again, due to Victor giving off a strong unhappy aura; however, a mishap on his part knocks him out. The Markers reveal they heal quickly, and Elda is relaxing from the ordeal. Per Karin's suggestion, the Markers each drink some of Victor's blood (which tastes horrible); drained of unhappiness, jealousy, stress, pride and self-deception, Victor becomes jovial and kind. The Markers rebuild their home and life resumes as normal. Elda later discovers she misread the ceremony; it was for increasing breast size. There's also a few changes, such as Anju taking advantage of the jealously of Ren's many girlfriends to feed, or Karin finally calling Kenta by his first name. Winner and Maki also appear to be in a relationship. The anime ends with silent fast forwards to the future, where KRin and Kenta get married and have a child.
