= Womanizer =

Womanizer may refer to:

- Womanizer (term), a promiscuous heterosexual man
- Womanizer (pressure wave vibrator), a series of pressure wave vibrators for sexual stimulation
- "Womanizer" (song), a 2008 song by Britney Spears
- Womanizer, a 2004 album by Absolute Steel
- "Womanizer", a 1977 song by Blood, Sweat & Tears from Brand New Day
- "Womanizer", a 2009 song by Sliimy from Paint Your Face
- The Womanizer, 1992 novella by Warren Adler
- The Womanizer, 2002 novel by Rick Salutin
