= Virtual sex =

Sexual activity via telecommunication

Virtual sex is sexual activity where two or more people (or one person and a virtual character) gather together via some form of communications equipment to arouse each other, often by the means of transmitting sexually explicit messages. Virtual sex describes the phenomenon, no matter the communications equipment used.

- Digital remote stimulation involves the use of electronic sex toys to stimulate a person in the genital area from a distance
- Camming is virtual sex that is over video chat from services that provide it.
- Cybersex is virtual sex typed over the Internet, including IRC, e-mail, instant messaging, chat rooms, webcam, role-playing games, etc.
- Phone sex is virtual sex spoken over the telephone.
- Sexting is virtual sex sent via mobile phone network text messaging. The advent of cell phones with built-in digital cameras has undoubtedly added new dimensions to these activities.
- Modern consumer virtual reality headsets allow users to engage in virtual sex through simulated environments, either with other humans or with virtual characters.

These terms and practices continuously evolve as technologies and methods of communication change.

Increases in Internet connectivity, bandwidth availability, and the proliferation of webcams have also had implications for virtual sex enthusiasts. It is increasingly common for these activities to include the exchange of pictures or motion video. There are companies which allow paying customers to watch people have live sex or masturbate and at the same time allow themselves to be watched as well. Recently, devices have been introduced and marketed to allow remote-controlled stimulation.

== Consent ==
An important part of taking part in virtual sex, or sexual acts, would be consent. The ethics of sexting are already being established by young people for whom consent figures as a critical concept. Distinctions between positive and negative experiences of sexting are mostly dependent on whether consent was given to make and share the images. As of 2015, it is illegal for any person under the age of 18 to consent to any form of virtual sex (only if nude pictures are sent), because images of minors are considered child pornography.

== Addiction ==
There are approximately one half to 2 million virtual sex addicts in the world that have access to the Internet and the prospectives of virtual sex on the Internet are appealing to them. The internet opens up a world where people can reinvent themselves and try on a completely different online persona; they can freely experiment with and explore a variety of new, hidden or repressed sexual behaviors, fetishes and sexual fantasies. This can feel liberating, but can also be extremely dangerous as it has the potential of becoming addicting and have adverse effects on cybernauts' other aspects of life. What attracts people to sex via the Internet can be explained by the “Triple A” engine of Affordability, Accessibility, and Anonymity. The "Triple A" engine represents the risk factors for people that are already susceptible to sexual compulsivity or psychological vulnerability related to sexual compulsivity.

Affordability is about the cheap price of virtual sex. Pornography magazines and videos used to have a price of $20 or more per individual piece, while today anyone can have access to unlimited amount of pornographic content at the price of a $20 monthly subscription to the internet. Accessibility is a person's capacity to have access to the Internet - a service that is virtually accessible to anyone in the world. Finally, anonymity references the ability to have access to sexual content without disclosing your true identity; this can feel empowering and make it that much easier to have sex, as one would not have to risk being seen by someone they know and feel ashamed or worried of possible gossips and rumors about them.

When does healthy virtual sex become a pathology? Addiction is defined by 3 main characteristics: compulsivity (not being able to freely choose when to stop or continue a behavior), continuation of the behavior despite adverse consequences, and obsession with the activity. When one loses control and lets virtual sex impact negatively at least one aspect of their life, this is when it stops being healthy. According to clinical studies, the main adverse consequences of virtual sex addiction are about the damage it causes in marital and other romantic relationships, disrupted due to online affairs and online sexual compulsivity. In a research study, it was found that online affairs and sexual compulsivity were reported by 53% of the virtual sex addicts interviewed to be the cause of disruption of their romantic relationships.

Virtual sex can become a coping mechanism to temporarily escape real life problems. However, it is not an effective one and even potentially harmful, as the underlying issues will go on unaddressed and only become more complex with time. Generally, there are a couple of patterns explaining why one can become addicted to virtual sex and the ways one can use it as a coping mechanism. Often, it is used to cope with emotional problems. Virtual sex can serve as a distraction from painful emotions, such as loneliness, stress, and anxiety, as consuming online pornographic content makes the addict feel more confident, desirable, and excited, creating a numbing effect. Another pattern involves young, insecure, socially awkward or emotionally troubled people who use internet to interact with others online rather than in person in order to avoid rejection from a real person. In the Internet they can find a virtually unlimited number of people who seem interesting and interested in them. They find the online world more comforting and safe, as it is harder to pick up on social cues of disapproval or judgement. Gradually, online friends can become more "real" than offline friends and an online friend can become an opportunity for online affair and cybersex. Partners that are cheated on through online affairs feel that online affairs are just as painful as offline ones - it is a significant source of stress, makes them feel betrayed as they were lied to, and feel insecure as they will negatively compare themselves with the online women or men. Virtual sex can become an escape and a new addiction for recovering sex addicts that are going through a stressful period in their life. Feeling triggered by life problems, prior sex addicts can find themselves using online pornographic content as a quick and easy, but temporary fix to help them soothe themselves, forget about life's problems, and feel better about themselves. Another pattern is when an individual takes advantage of the online sexual content to explore forbidden, hidden, and repressed sexual fantasies, which can become addicting and completely absorb the person into this virtual space.

== Long-distance relationships ==
Approximately 14 million people in the United States are in a long distance relationship. Among young adults, 40% to 50% are in a long distance relationship at any given time, as well as 75% of college students at least at one given moment during their studies. It is expected that the number of long distance relationships will be increasing due to the globalized nature of today's world. Hence, the internet might be a useful tool to make long distance relationships work. One way couples in long-distance relationships engage in a sexual activity online is through sexting. Self-expression through sexting between partners can create a feeling of intimacy and closeness between partners even at a distance. Long distance relationships may be more susceptible to sexual boredom, hence sexting can be an effective way of keeping partners sexually engaged at a distance. In a study, the associations between sexting and feelings of closeness were studied. It was found that more sexting more often in a long distance relationship was not predictive of higher interpersonal closeness between the partners. However, there was found a correlation between sexting and sexual satisfaction, as well as relationship satisfaction.

== See also ==
- Red Light Center
- Teledildonics
- Virtual reality sex
- Deuel, Nancy R. 1996. Our passionate response to virtual reality. Computer-mediated Communication: Linguistic, Social, and Cross-Cultural Perspectives, p. 129-146. Ed. by Susan C. Herring. John Benjamins Publishing Company, Philadelphia.
- Lunceford, Brett. “Virtual Sex.” In Encyclopedia of Gender in Media, edited by Mary Kosut. Thousand Oaks, CA: Sage, 2012.
