= Metafetish =

Blog

Metafetish (formerly Slashdong) is a blog about teledildonics and similar use of technology for erotic purposes.

== Description ==
It is run by engineer Kyle Machulis, under the pen name qDot. It promotes DIY sex-toy designs and open-source software to drive them, including an Xbox modification to power a software-controlled dildo, and even a vibrator-control package for emacs called Deldo.

The site has been featured in Wired's Sex Drive column. Machulis has also been a speaker at several conferences on issues related to sex and technology including Etech and Arse Elektronika, his presentations remarked in the O'Reilly Conference Blog and the Digital Journal.

Since 2015 the site is no longer called slashdong, the new URL is metafetish.com "because Kyle got sick of explaining what slashdot was and that he didn't like cutting up penises".
