= Ela Darling =

American actress

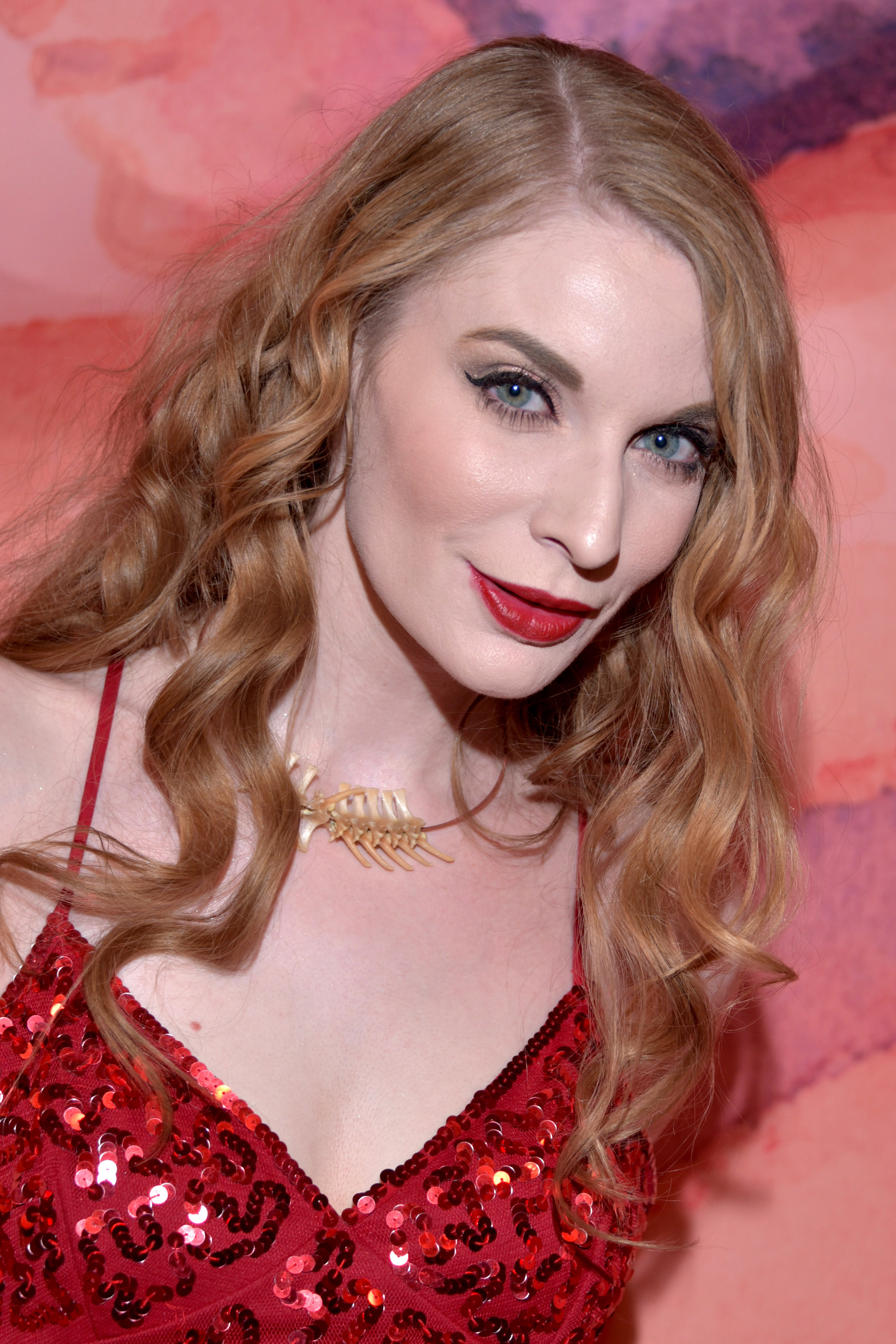
- Darling in 2019
- Education: University of Illinois Urbana-Champaign (MLIS)
- Occupations: Pornographic film actress; entrepreneur

Ela Darling is an American pornographic film actress and co-founder of virtual reality company VRTube.xxx. According to The New York Times, Darling first used virtual reality technology to record an erotic scenario in 2014.

== Life and career ==
Darling earned a Master of Library Science degree from the University of Illinois, and worked as a reference librarian prior to becoming an actor and entrepreneur.

Darling has spoken at conferences focused on virtual reality. She was also one of the individuals profiled in Allan Amato's 2016 book Slip: Naked in Your Own Words.

In 2014, she started VRTube.xxx and has been considered a pioneer and an entrepreneur in the industry of Virtual Reality erotica; an industry that was projected in 2018 to grow to $1 billion (USD) by 2020.

In 2016, Darling received the Free Speech Coalition Positive Image Award.

At the 2016 South by Southwest Festival, The Guardian quoted Darling asserting that patent holders were preventing the production of teledildonic technology.

In a 2017 profile of Darling, Rolling Stone described Darling's first time filming a VR experience.

Darling won the 2018 XBIZ Award for "Crossover Star of the Year".
