= How to Be a Cyber-Lovah =

- Directed by: Keir Serrie
- Written by: Garth Mueller; Keir Serrie; John Webb
- Produced by: Brian Hoodenpyle; Garth Mueller; Keir Serrie; John Webb
- Starring: Chad Benton; Patricia Aline; Victor Barreiro; Melissa Carter; Richard Fulcher; Ken Ng; Julie Eagleton; Alana Liles; Lisa Rosen
- Cinematography: Brian Hoodenpyle
- Distributed by: Atom Films
- Release date: 2001
- Running time: 6 minutes
- Country: United States
- Language: English

How to Be a Cyber-Lovah is a 2001 comedic film directed and co-written by Keir Serrie and starring Chad Benton.

== Plot ==
A parody of 21st-century infomercials hosted by Herb Zipper about the world of cybersex.

== Critical reception ==
Film Threat called How to Be a Cyber-Lovah "Hilarious," and went on to say, "The fake infomercial is for Herb Zipper, the Hugh Hefner of cyberspace, who has mastered the art of getting the ladies to submit to him through their keyboards. This short looks very much like an infomercial and in its brief running length, completely trashes the whole idea of cyber-sex."

Chicago Reader, "Keir Serrie’s mock infomercial How to Be a Cyber-Lovah (8 min.) is a vicious lampoon of on-line coupling (“We’re gods! I had sex with a cheerleader last night!" “Oh—that was me")"

The Guardian, "Director Keir Serrie's cruelly accurate spoof infomercial is packed with handy hints for putting yourself in the shop window ( "Deceptively attractive online photos can be classified as: a) full body transplant b) fountain of youth or c) lying out of your ass") and top tips about the one-click break-up."

== See also ==
- Cybersex
- Internet sex addiction
- Sexting
