= A Spy on Mother Midnight =

1748 erotic novel

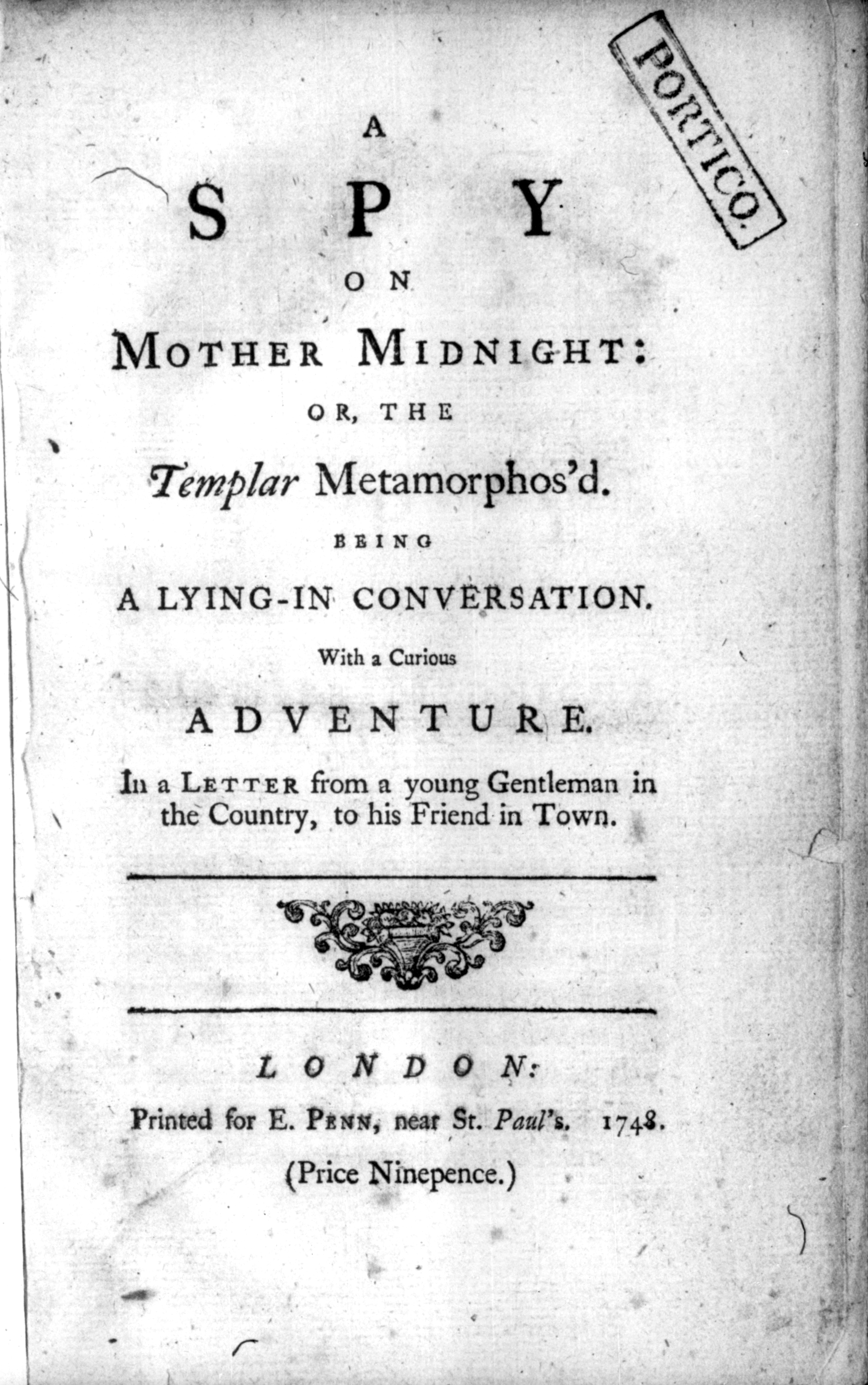
- Genre: erotica
- Publication date: 1748
- Publication place: England
- Pages: 142

A Spy on Mother Midnight (1748) is an erotic epistolary tale published in three chapbooks. Its narrator, Richard F------, disguises himself as a woman in order to have sex clandestinely with a series of women. The full title page of the book reads: A Spy on Mother Midnight: Or, The Templar Metamorphos'd. Being a Lying-In Conversation. With a Curious Adventure. In a Letter from a young Gentleman in the Country, to his Friend in Town. Although the book was originally written as pornography, it is now studied for its depiction of eighteenth-century English gender and sexuality, especially its depictions of dildos, cross-dressing, and homoeroticism.

== Synopsis ==
Richard F------, called Dick, is an urban rake who has spent months pursuing a prudish country girl, Maria. He cross-dresses to assume the persona of "Miss Polly", a disguise he finds easy and enjoyable throughout the book. He follows Maria to an isolated country inn, accompanied by a friend, Nancy, who acts as his maid. Maria is at the inn to attend her cousin's lying-in (i.e., her late pregnancy, birth, and post-natal recovery). "Miss Polly" is also invited to the lying-in, where Dick is shocked by the women's sexually frank conversation, led by the midwife Mother Midnight. That evening, Maria invites "Miss Polly" to share her bed, a common practice for travellers of the same sex. Dick sees an ivory dildo in Maria's belongings, revealing that she is more interested in sex she had seemed. "Miss Polly" suggests using the dildo together to pretend that Maria is having sex with Dick; he substitutes his own penis, which initially surprises but then delights Maria.

In the morning, Maria destroys her dildo, preferring Dick's penis. However, she is worried because Nancy knows they had sex. Dick defends Nancy's character, telling the story of how she was seduced and abandoned, and then turned to sex work. Dick and Maria enjoy sex for a second night. More guests arrive at the inn, including Maria's cousin Fanny, who attracts Dick. Maria is called away to visit an ill relative elsewhere, and Fanny shares a bed with "Miss Polly" instead. Fanny asks for a massage of a sore spot on her thigh, which Dick takes as an excuse to finger her. When Fanny realises he is a man, she immediately rejects him, but decides not to call for help so that her cousin Maria will not face a scandal for sharing his room for the past two nights.

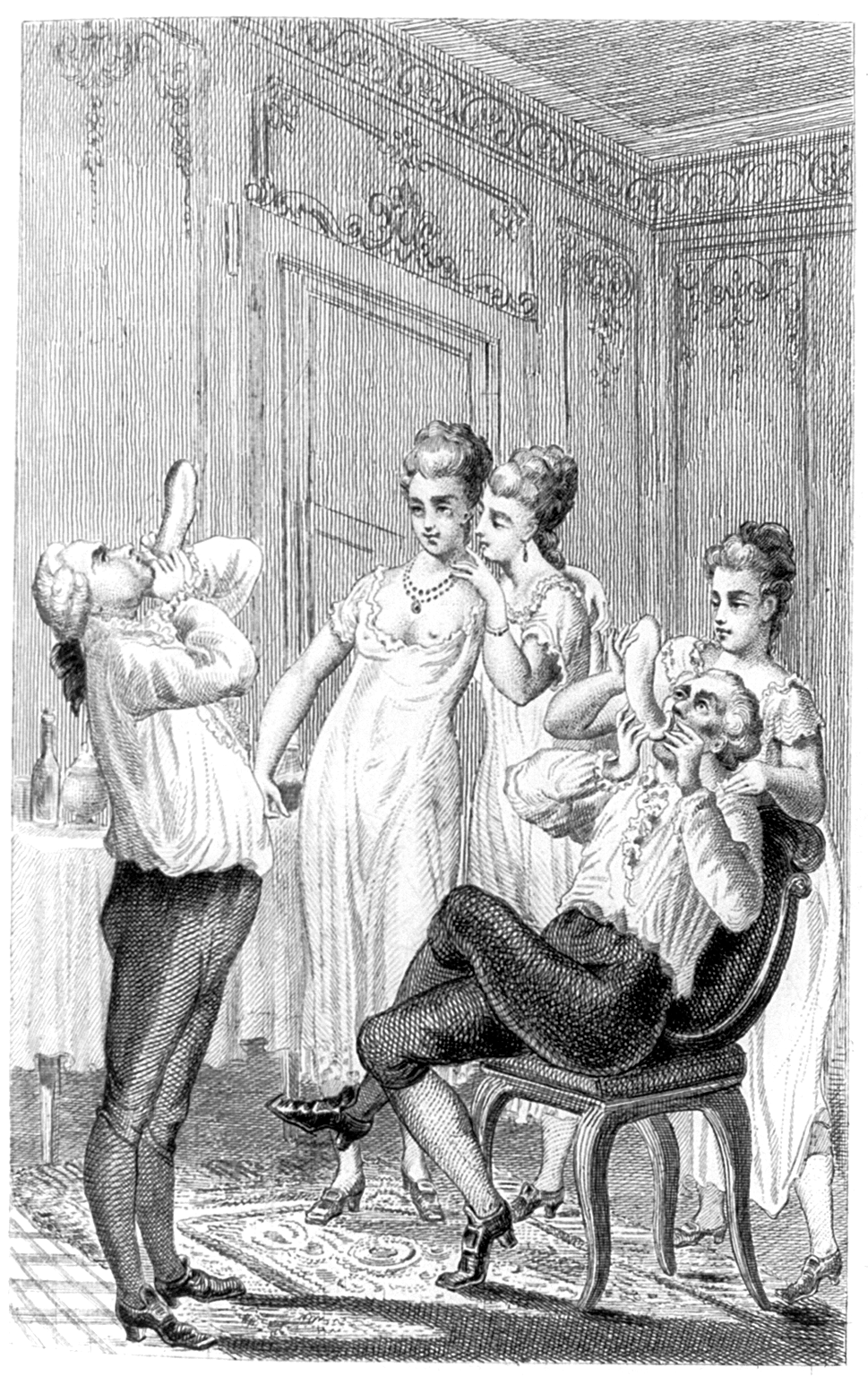
Casanova and a friend inflating condoms prior to sex to test for holes, in an 1872 illustration. Dick's supply of condoms in Mother Midnight assists him in keeping sex consequence-free.

Dick resolves to talk Fanny into having sex. He reassures her that there is no risk of pregnancy, because he has condoms. He puts one on. Fanny verbally protests, but he embraces and penetrates her, which ultimately inspires pleasure. They continue to have sex over the next two or three days. Meanwhile, Nancy notices an attractive housemaid, Sally, and wagers Dick that he can't resist having sex with her. Nancy invites Sally to share her bed; Dick takes Nancy's place, and they have sex. When Dick returns to Fanny's bed, she laughs at him for losing the bet, and reveals that she had taken Sally's place in a bed trick. The next guests at the inn are a Methodist preacher and a young squire, both of whom pursue "Miss Polly". "Miss Polly" seduces both men into planning an assignation, allowing Dick and Nancy to trick the preacher into being locked in the privy overnight, and to trick the squire into marrying Nancy. Nancy, the squire, and "Miss Polly" depart for London in good cheer.

== Publication history ==
The story was published anonymously, in three parts. Part two was titled A Continuation of Mr. F--------'s Adventures in Petty-Coats: Being the Second Part of The Spy on Mother Midnight, and part three was A Further Continuation of Mr. F------'s Adventures in Petty-Coats: Being the Third and Last Part of the Spy on Mother Midnight. Part one was advertised for sale for nine shillings in the February 1748 issue of The London Magazine, and part two was advertised the next month for one shilling.

The story was also sold as part of an anthology of pornography from the year, The Temple of Fame: or, the Sc—d—l—s [i.e., Scandalous] Chronicle for the Year 1748, but had no re-issues in new editions in the eighteenth century, suggesting a relatively small audience or lack of commercial success at the time. It did not gain attention until a modern interest in the history of sexuality, especially queer sexuality. An excerpt was reprinted in Secret Sexualities: A Sourcebook of 17th and 18th Century Writing (1997) among its "Sapphic Texts", and the full work was included in Eighteenth-Century British Erotica (2004).

== Style ==
The story is told through six fictitious letters, addressed to Dick's friend Jack. It is noted for its light-hearted tone, which makes no apologies for its content. Like most English erotica of the period, it employs metaphor and allusion rather than dwelling in detail on the movement of specific body parts. Its main narrative technique is to build up detailed anticipation during the narrator's flirtation and approach, and then to suddenly stop at the moment of consummation and leave the reader to imagine the rest. When Dick and Maria first have sex, for example, Dick describes embracing Maria, and then penetration is implied by Maria's exclamation of surprise when she realises that Dick's penis is not her dildo. This tendency to allusively gloss over sexual acts distinguishes A Spy on Mother Midnight in the period as erotica rather than pornography, which (especially in French works) would be more descriptive. Often, the metaphorical language for sexual acts relies on punning. Especially when Dick describes meeting Maria at church, the puns play on religious language. Repurposing religious language for double entendres was another common rhetorical technique of eighteenth-century erotic texts, which often lampooned religious morality.

== Major themes ==
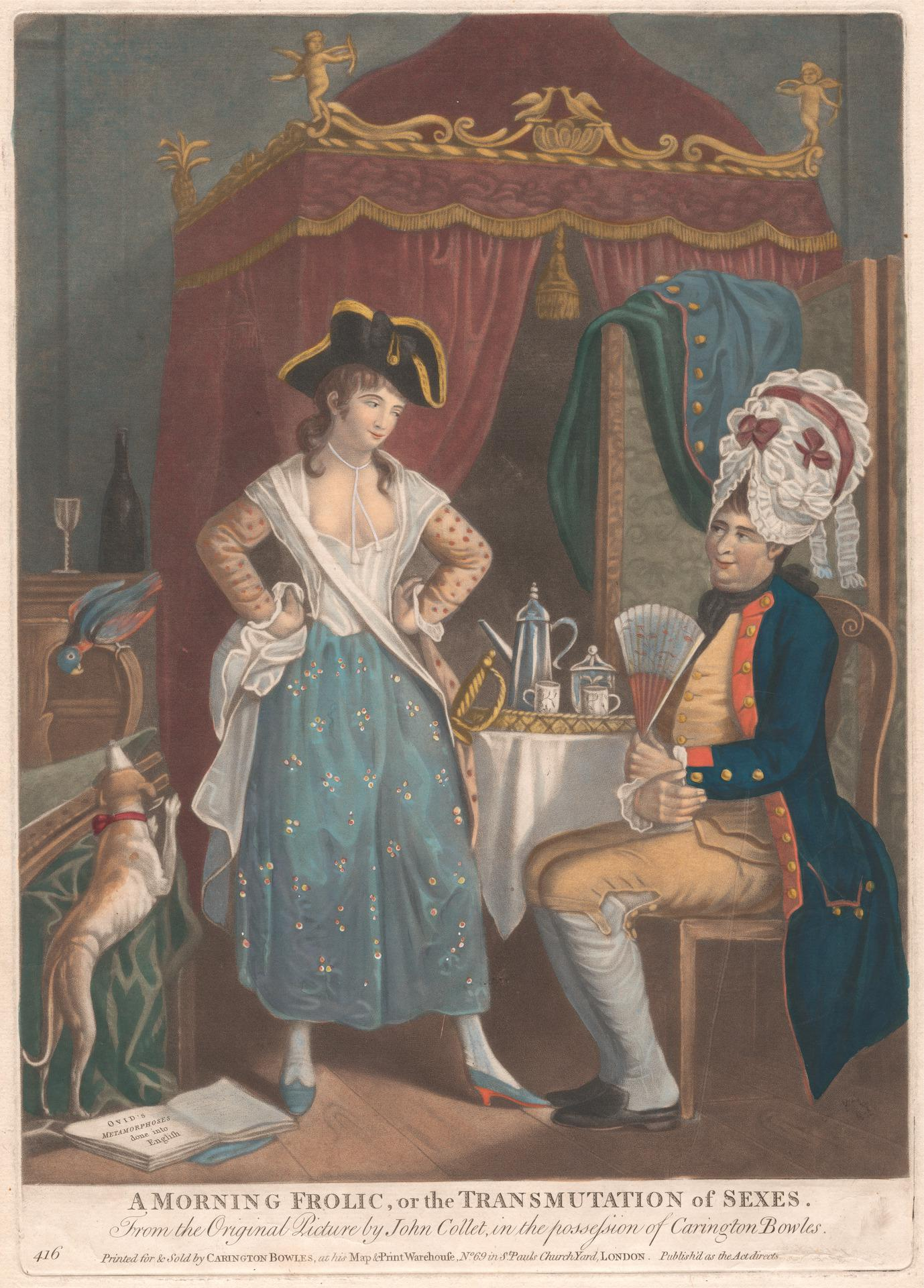
A Morning Frolic, or the Transmutation of the Sexes, a mezzotint c. 1780 after a painting by John Collett, depicting cross-dressing. On the floor is a copy of Ovid's Metamorphoses, also referenced in Mother Midnight's subtitle The Templar Metamorphos'd.

=== Cross-dressing as social boundary-crossing ===
In Mother Midnight, the introduction of a disguise would have signalled the book's erotic content to eighteenth-century readers, further emphasized by the subtitles of the two continuations, Adventures in Petty-Coats. Masquerades and costumes were, in general, associated with social and sexual license in eighteenth-century fiction. At public masked costume parties, the plausible deniability of anonymity allowed both men and women unusual social freedom. Dick's costume allows him to cross boundaries of both gender and class, since "Miss Polly" is not a member of the gentry. As a result, the story presents these social categories as potentially fluid.

The historian Kathleen Lubey also highlights an ambivalence about penises within the work's depiction of cross-dressing and dildos. Dick is sometimes troubled by erections which might undermine his disguise; Lubey argues that, in these moments, "Cross-dressing reveals the loose connection between man and penis, which stands erect irrespective of its owner's wishes, his peer rather than his subordinate." When he later fantasizes about becoming a dildo, Lubey argues, he admires the dildo as a "supramasculine" object: "It penetrates more frequently, outperforms men, and immerses its entirety into the bodies of women unrestrained by modesty." The scholar Julie Park interprets this fantasy as a dissolution of his status as man and heterosexual in pursuit of the secret inner world of female pleasure, and an extension of his gender transgressions in entering female spaces.

=== Sexual libertinism and homoeroticism ===
The primary theme of the book is an embrace of sexual libertinism. Unlike works such as The Libertine (1807), which ends with its titular libertine being swallowed into hell, the ending of Mother Midnight does not punish any of the characters. The sexual encounters are presented as non-violent and enjoyable for all parties, with no negative consequences. Moreover, none of Dick's sexual partners are ultimately restrained by marriage. These factors were not guaranteed in eighteenth-century pornography, and reflect this work's enthusiasm for sex.

A Spy on Mother Midnight is especially notable for extending its lighthearted and permissive attitude to the narrator's cross-dressing and flirtations with men. Other literature of the period is almost universally derogatory of "mollies" and men who cross-dress. Even in pornography, any discussion of sodomy would be followed by harsh condemnations insisting that all sodomites will be punished. Dick, however, brags about how easily his feminine features allow him to cross-dress, and intentionally stokes the lust of his male suitors at the end of the work. The narrator directly addresses the fellow libertine to whom his letters are written, drawing attention to the fact that the expected reader of his escapades is also male and creating an entirely homoerotic scenario in which a man describes his seduction of another man for the titillation of a third man. Through the all-female dialogue at the lying-in, the story also provides an extensive and detailed discussion of the relative attractiveness of various kinds of penis. Taken together, these factors present male homoeroticism as non-threatening and even fun, while remaining sufficiently subtextual that no homophobic disavowals are necessary.

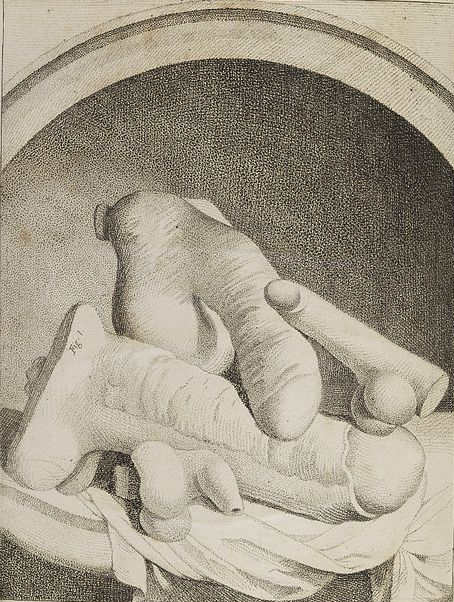
Dildos, from the frontispiece of the 1786 book An Account of the Remains of the Worship of Priapus.

In addition to its male homoerotic subtext, A Spy on Mother Midnight is also known for its female homoerotic text. All of Dick's sexual access to women relies on their belief that he, too, is a woman. The secret female-only sexual world that he enters is most prominently represented by Maria's dildo. In eighteenth-century pornography, the dildo appears as a material symbol of lesbian desire, and potentially threatening as a tool for women's sexual independence. According to the literary scholar Emma Donoghue, the narrator's act of substituting his penis for Maria's dildo enacted a recurring eighteenth-century fantasy of "outdoing and tricking lesbians whose use of a dildo threatens male power". Afterward, Dick lectures Maria that their sex was "less sinful, and indisputably more natural, than ... she heretofore had Recourse to", reinforcing a heterosexual morality.

=== The sexual power of midwives ===
"Mother Midnight"—part of the book's title, and the name of one of its characters—was a cant term for a sexualized midwife, often used for a stock character. Birth and midwifery were recurring themes in eighteenth-century pornography; erotic texts might sell themselves as midwifery manuals. When A Spy on Mother Midnight was published in the middle of the eighteenth century, midwifery was increasingly practiced by male midwives and physicians. A female midwife was therefore a potentially disreputable figure, notable for her sexual knowledge. In fiction, midwives were typically characterized as bawdy, and frequently as sexual procurers. The Mother Midnight in the novel, like other fictional midwives with this name, uses her position of privileged knowledge to exert power over men. She instructs young women on the standards they should expect from their husbands' sexual performance, and she assists in multiple sexual deceptions. In the story's opening birth scene, for example, Mother Midnight knows that the mother's husband is not the father of her baby, and conceals this disruption of the family line.

The midwife is also the figurehead for the lying-in, a female-only social gathering of friends and family who arrive to support a new mother before and after birth. Because the lying-in was intimate, private, and barred to men, some men viewed it as a tantalizing mystery. In molly houses, men would sometimes cross-dress to act out parodic birth and lying-in scenes, further associating the lying-in with homoeroticism.

== See also ==
- 18th-century erotic literature
- Venus in the Cloister
- Memoirs of a Woman of Pleasure
