= OhMiBod =

American sex toys manufacturer

- Type: Private
- Industry: Sex toys
- Founded: 2006; 20 years ago
- Founder: Suki Dunham; Brian Dunham
- Headquarters: New Hampshire, United States
- Area served: Worldwide
- Website: ohmibod.com

OhMiBod is an American company that manufactures sex toys, based in New Hampshire, United States.

== Overview ==
Its name has been used as a collective reference to a range of remote controlled vibrating sex toys. The device originally translated an electronic music output into vibrations, with the volume and beat of the music determining the strength of the vibrations.

Co-creator Suki Vatter previously worked for Apple's product marketing department and the product was first targeted to iPod users. Vatter, who created the product with her husband Brian, said that the vibrator is designed to be "socially acceptable". One journalist commented that the packaging looked like "something that might have come straight from the iPod factory".

The website for the product also included the series "ClubVibe" which allows users to anonymously share playlists and experiences.

The product was made compatible with the iPhone in January 2008 and now responds to ringtones and voice calls. In addition to the upgrade, a smaller and cheaper 'nano' versions of the toy was released.

A 2008 review in MacLife pointed out that the vibrator could be heard "distractingly loud" over the iPod's earbuds.

Ohmibod has been used by webcam models, who program it to vibrate to the sound of online tips.

Body Heat is the name of an iPhone app designed to control an OhMiBod vibrator's vibration speed, intensity, and patterns. OhMiBod team acquired the product after a prototype was presented at the sex technology conference Arse Elektronika in September 2010 in San Francisco. The app's designer Heather Kelley is collaborating with them on creating upgrades of the software.

== See also ==
- Lovense
- Teledildonics
- Lovehoney
