= The Choise of Valentines =

Poem by Thomas Nashe

The Choise of Valentines Or the Merie Ballad of Nash His Dildo, which alternatively acquired the label "Nashe's Dildo", is an erotic poem by Thomas Nashe, thought to have been composed around 1592 or 1593. The poem survives in three extant manuscript versions and was first printed in 1899. It recounts in the first person a sexual encounter in a brothel between the narrator, Tomalin, and his lover, Mistress Frances. The poem contains the most detailed description of a dildo in Renaissance literature, and contains one of the first attestations of the word dildo, though the word seems to derive ultimately from nonsense syllables common in early-modern popular ballads.

In the prologue, Nashe dedicates the poem to “the right honorable the Lord S.”, who is evidently Henry Wriothesley, 3rd Earl of Southampton, Shakespeare's patron and friend. Then in the epilogue when Nashe writes “My muse devorst from deeper care, presents thee with a wanton elegie", it appears that Nashe indeed wrote the poem with the patronage of Southampton.

== Plot summary ==
As it is Valentine's Day, Tomalin goes to seek his flame, Mistress Frances, where she lives in the country, but discovers that she has been driven away by the local authorities and now resides in a brothel in the city. He enters the brothel, posing as a customer, and is offered other women by its Madame, but it is his lover that Tomalin really wants to see, even though it will cost him more. Tomalin is shown to Mistress Frances' room and is greeted with reciprocal passion, but before penetrating her he suffers from premature ejaculation due to his excitement. Mistress Frances lends Tomalin a helping hand to revive his erection, and the two have sex. During intercourse, she admonishes Tomalin to slow down and sets a rhythm more amenable to her own sexual gratification. Tomalin eventually climaxes, and his lover appears to climax as well, but soon expresses that she is not fully satisfied, and resorts to using a dildo. After a long description of the dildo, Tomalin pays for the services rendered and leaves the brothel, asking the readers, "Judge, gentlemen, if I deserve not thanks?"

== Criticism ==
The Choise of Valentines was not published until 1899, in an edition limited to subscribers and apparently intended for collectors of pornography. In 1905 Ronald B. McKerrow included the poem in his edition of Nashe's works. The poem is of particular interest to literary scholars concerned with late Elizabethan representations of gender and sexuality.

Ian Moulton reads the poem as expressing anxieties about masculine sexuality, including men's inability to satisfy women and women's sexual autonomy in taking their pleasure into their own hands. Moulton also describes how several of the extant manuscripts differ widely from the more complete Petyt version, three of them omitting entirely the long description of the dildo, and one of these being partially written in cipher.

A Choise of Valentines is a complex poem: Boika Sokolova writes, "For all its explicitness, . . . the poem manages to diffuse the pornographic through sparkling wit, literary allusion and self-conscious mock-seriousness."
