= Sex technology =

Technology related to human sexual activity

Sex technology, also known as sex-tech or sextech, are technologies that are designed to simulate or assist in the human sexual experience. The term was first propagated online by Cindy Gallop, associated with the beginning of the Information Age on the offset of the 2010s, and its sometimes used interchangeably with the term "teledildonics". Sex technology comprehends the usage of remote controlled or autonomous sex toys, sexual health platforms or apps, virtual reality pornography and sex robots.

Other notable individuals who have pushed the development and/or divulgation of sex technology include:

- Polly Rodriguez (Co-founder and CEO of Unbound, a sexual wellness company)
- Alexandra Fine and Janet Lieberman (Founders of Dame Products)
- Andrea Barrica (Founder and CEO of O.School, an online sexual education platform)
- Anna Lee (Co-founder of Lioness)
- Kate Moyle (Psychosexual & Relationship Therapist, Co-founder of The Thought House Partnership, and UK Sex Expert for LELO)
- Raven V. Faber (Founder and CEO of EngErotics, Inc)
- Dr. Soumyadip Rakshit and Stephanie Alys (Co-founders of MysteryVibe)
- Dr. Kate Devlin (Goldsmiths University)
- Maxine Lynn (Sextech Attorney, and CEO of Stript Erotic Designs)
- Alix Fox
- Nichi Hodgson
- Rebecca Newman
- Gigi Engle
- Bryony Cole
- Suzannah Weiss
- Joseph Seon Kim
- Hallie Lieberman
- GirlOnTheNet

Andrea Barrica estimated the market at $30 billion in 2018, with $800 million coming from Amazon sales.

== Impact ==
=== Advantages ===
1. Possibility of sexual enlightenment
2. Stronger relationships
3. Suitable for both men and women of all types
4. Cure for loneliness

=== Criticism ===
1. Risk of addiction
2. Cyber-risk
3. Unnecessary or unlawful collection and use of sensitive personal data
4. Potential for harm and inequality caused by sex robots

== See also ==
- Artificial intelligence
- Augmented reality
- Cybersex
- Haptic technology
- Teledildonics
- Vibrators
- Virtual reality sex
