= Red Light Center =

- Developer: Utherverse Digital
- Publisher: Utherverse Digital
- Platform: Windows
- Release: 30 December 2005
- Genre: Virtual world

Red Light Center (RLC) is an online virtual world that was made available to the public in 2005 by Utherverse Inc. Its tag line is "EXPAND Your Fantasy". Red Light Center is modeled after Amsterdam's Red Light District. The online community site offers users virtual nightclubs, hotels, bars, movie theaters and stores. There is a virtual currency called Rays, which members can earn and use for services in the community, Zaby apartments, Gifts for other members, and various other purposes. Rays can also be sold on an open Marketplace for real currency.

The last press release noting RLC membership, in March 2008, estimated the registered userbase at over 1.5 million.

== Gameplay ==
A player can own their own Zaby apartment within the 3D World. It is possible to install televisions with streaming video, or a jukebox with music. One can color the walls, and place furniture. The Zaby apartments vary in size from a small one-bedroom apartment to a large country house.

There are other worlds attached to Red Light Center, the largest of which is Virtual Vancouver, modeled on the city of Vancouver, which includes notable landmarks and buildings. Virtual Vancouver hosts Art Gallery shows, streaming concerts, book festivals, and other cultural events.

Red Light Center offers Community Events, such as classes, meeting rooms, live music with dancing and art-gallery openings. Users also have the ability to put on their own events. In many locations, one can smoke hookahs of ganja and eat magic mushrooms, which can have their effects shaken off at the user's choice.

As an adult playground, RLC features a sex function for VIP members. The users are represented by avatars, which may be customized personally to suit a user's tastes, and may be used to have virtual sex with another. Certain areas of RLC provide a bed for the users and cater to various popular fantasies. Users have access to underwater caves, locker rooms, a hotel, and bordello rooms, all of which are private spots. There are several themed and equipped rooms available for BDSM play. The avatars are all anatomically correct and the sexual activity is detailed and animated. Users choose a position or action from a menu and then watch it happen with their avatar partner. Since both partners have the same menu to choose from, the result is a visual cybersex.

== Roles ==
Within the RLC metaverse, there are several roles and functions which are provided solely by currently active members of the RLC community.

Working Girls/Guys are members that are allowed to sell sexual services for in-game currency, which can be exchanged for U.S. dollars.

Guides have the role of helping new members learn their way around, giving tours, answering questions, and helping with minor disputes.

Greeters take over where the guides leave off. The job of greeters is to make new members feel welcome and to ensure that everyone has a good time. Greeters help the members have a good time and party. They introduce new members to other members so they will get to know people sooner. Greeters are a staff position. Ambassadors are the volunteer counterparts.

The next role is Leader, which is a promotion for those guides who have shown themselves to be seriously dedicated to helping the community. They now have the added responsibility of helping the guides, trying to settle disputes, and assisting the protectors in any way they can.

A Protector is the highest role that most members can reach. This is someone who has proven themselves to be very dedicated to the community; they are essentially moderators. Protectors are entrusted with helping the guides, leaders, and all the other members. Protectors step into situations that the leaders or others can't get under control. Protectors try to reason with members, and if after an ample amount of time and warnings, booting a member if needed.

Community Supervisor is in charge of helping, training, and moderating the guides, recommending promotions, as well as assisting the leaders. They are protectors or leaders who have been promoted to this leadership position. They have the same roles as the leaders and guides, but with these added responsibilities. They also work closely with the protectors and Community Moderators.

Community Moderator was created in tandem with the growing number of members joining the community. In addition to being protectors, community moderators are there to assist everyone. They help guides, leaders, and protectors with any problems or complaints they may have, and act as a main pipeline to the higher staff. They also help with members' complaints and problems. This position has all but been replaced by the Staff Moderators.

Staff Moderators are a special staff position created to ensure a better staff involvement with in-world issues. They oversee and assist the duties of both the Community Moderators and Supervisors, therefore assisting with the oversight of this branch of volunteers. They also provide a conduit between volunteers/members and higher staff as well as handle any in-world issues that need attention.

== The Concept ==
Essentially, the "Utherverse" besides being the parent company is namely also the universe or "Metaverse" that engulfs all of the cities that make up the environment. Cities such as Red Light Center, Loki Land and Virtual Vancouver, while both a part of the big picture, are each separate entities connected to each other by "transport centers" linking them together.

In keeping with its suggestion that there should eventually be "millions of worlds, all of them connected, searchable, and customized..." the company claims it will license the use of its software infrastructure to anyone who wishes to create entire worlds on the scale of either of its existing properties, or much larger, on terms of a franchise. The company has recently released the groundwork for this with its Virtual World Web (VWW) option to its service. This enables any member to create a virtual world of their own for personal or business intent.

The Utherverse social center, is comparable to Myspace or Facebook but with less content limitation and with some dating flavor.

Freedom of speech and expression, within the confines of the law, are a key factor to the concept's appeal. There is a rewards system namely an in-world currency, referred to as 'Rays', in memory of Ray Schwartz, the late co-founder of Utherverse, which pays you for browsing profiles, rating pictures, creating and selling clothing etc. This currency and the vast amount of creativity in the Utherverse is also the driving force of the in-world economy.

== Award Nominations ==
- 2010 XBIZ Award Nominee: Innovative Company of the Year

== Press ==
- Sexgame Reviews: Interview with Brian Shuster, CEO of Utherverse/Red Light Center
- The New Amsterdam: An Interview with Utherverse CEO, Brian Shuster
- RLC in the LA Times
- RLC Gay Marriage On Eyebeam
- Free Pot? High Times Story on RLC
- The Irresistible Rise Of Cybersex on NewScientistTech.com
- "Red Light Center Exposed". Wired. August 4, 2006. Archived from the original on June 26, 2008.
- "Red Light Center Exposed". Wired. August 4, 2006.
- PCMag article
