= Cybersex =

Virtual sex encounter

Cybersex, also called Internet sex, computer sex, netsex, e-sex, cybering, is a virtual sex encounter in which two or more people have long distance sex via electronic text or video communication (webcams, VR headsets, etc.) and other electronics (such as teledildonics) connected to a computer network.

Cybersex can also mean sending each other sexually explicit messages without having sex, and simply describing a sexual experience (also known as "sexting"). Cybersex is a sub-type of technology-mediated sexual interactions. In one form, this is accomplished by the participants describing their actions and responding to their chat partners in a mostly written form designed to stimulate their own sexual feelings and fantasies. Cybersex often includes real life masturbation. Environments in which cybersex takes place are not necessarily exclusively devoted to that subject, and participants in any Internet chat may suddenly receive a message of invitation.

Non-marital, adult, consensual paid cybersex counts as illegal solicitation of prostitution and illegal prostitution in multiple US states. Non-consensual cybersex sometimes occurs in cybersex trafficking crimes. There also has been at least one rape conviction for purely virtual sexual encounters.

== Environments ==
Cybersex is commonly performed in Internet chat rooms (such as IRC, talkers or web chats) and on instant messaging systems. It can also be performed using webcams, voice chat, or online games and/or virtual worlds like Second Life or VRChat.

The exact definition of cybersex—specifically, whether real-life masturbation must be taking place for the online sex act to count as cybersex—is up for debate. It is also fairly frequent in online role-playing games, such as MUDs and MMORPGs, though community attitudes toward this activity vary greatly from game to game. Some online social games like Red Light Center are dedicated to cybersex and other adult behaviors.

Cybersex may also be accomplished through the use of avatars in a multiuser software environment. It is often called mudsex or netsex in MUDs. In TinyMUD variants, particularly MUCKs, the term TinySex (TS) is very common. In a textual environment, good writing skills are a desirable trait in a cybersex partner.

Though text-based cybersex has been in practice for decades, the increased popularity of webcams has raised the number of online partners using two-way video connections to "expose" themselves to each other online—giving the act of cybersex a more visual aspect. There are a number of popular, commercial webcam sites that allow people to openly masturbate on camera while others watch them. Using similar sites, couples can also perform on camera for the enjoyment of others.

In online worlds like Second Life and via webcam-focused chat services, however, Internet sex workers engage in cybersex in exchange for both virtual and real-life currency.

The OnlyFans internet platform, originally created in 2016 for performers to directly monetize their content and interactions, became mainstream during the 2020 COVID-19 pandemic with most of its performers monetizing cybersex.

== Advantages ==
Cybersex provides various advantages:

- Cybersex allows real-life partners who are physically separated to continue to be sexually intimate. In geographically separated relationships, it can function to sustain the sexual dimension of a relationship in which the partners see each other only infrequently face to face. Also, it can allow partners to work out problems that they have in their sex life that they feel uncomfortable bringing up otherwise.
- Cybersex allows for sexual exploration. For example, it can enable participants to act out fantasies which they would not act out (or perhaps would not even be realistically possible) in real life through roleplaying due to physical or social limitations
- Cybersex is a relatively safe form of sexual exploration in comparison to face-to-face sexual interactions. Sexually transmitted infections, unwanted pregnancies and physical violence are no dangers in online contexts, which is an advantage especially for women.
- It takes less effort and fewer resources on the Internet than in real life to connect to a person like oneself or with whom a more meaningful relationship is possible.

Research reviews and surveys call for a balanced view of online sexual activities in general and cybersex in particular that acknowledges both advantages and disadvantages, positive and negative effects.

== Legality of consensual, paid cybersex ==
=== United States ===
Several US states use very broad language in their criminal code for prostitution and prostitution related crimes. For example, the criminal code in multiple US states does not necessitate physical presence to be an element of prostitution. The role of physical presence in states with broad prostitution definitions has at times been debated in court.

==== California ====
California has one such broad law about prostitution, and the California supreme court ruled in Wooten v. Superior Court that physical contact is necessary for a prostitution conviction. However, this only protects long distance buyers of cybersex in that state and may not apply to all sellers of cybersex services.

Sellers of cybersex in California may still be convicted under existing prostitution laws. Court cases such as Pryor v. Municipal Court and People v. Hill determined that touching of genitals, buttocks, or the female breast is essential to a prostitution conviction. As a result, physical touching between two sellers of during a live cybersex service "for the purpose of sexual arousal", and coupled with "money or other considerations", may in fact qualify as prostitution.

==== Wisconsin ====
Buyers of cybersex services have more criminal liability under solicitation of prostitution laws than act-of-prostitution laws. For example, the Wisconsin Supreme Court ruled that illegal solicitation of prostitution can occur with a lack of physical contact. Wisconsin v. Kittilstad ruled that simply offering money to view people having in-person sex, even from a distance, counts as solicitation of prostitution.

Wisconsin also explicitly criminalizes offers or requests of non-marital sexual intercourse for anything of value. This allows for criminal prosecution of non-marital, paid cybersex acts where at least one party resides in Wisconsin and at least one party has physical sex as part of the cybersex act.

=== Measures undertaken by cybersex sites to avoid criminal liability ===
To reduce the potential of criminal liability in cybersex selling, Voyeur Dorm, the operator of a controversial voyeurism-focused website, implemented a "no sex on camera" policy. The site was ordered to shut down in 1999, with an unsuccessful appeal two years later.

== Non-consensual cybersex ==
=== Cybersex trafficking ===
Cybersex trafficking is the live streaming of coerced sexual acts and or rape. Victims are abducted, threatened, or deceived and transferred to 'cybersex dens.' The dens can be in any location where the cybersex traffickers have a computer, tablet, or phone with internet connection. Perpetrators use social media networks, videoconferences, pornographic video sharing websites, dating pages, online chat rooms, apps, dark web sites, and other platforms. They use online payment systems and cryptocurrencies to hide their identities. Millions of reports of its occurrence are sent to authorities annually. South China Morning Post has stated that new laws and police procedures are needed to combat this type of cybercrime.

=== Cyber-rape ===
A Swedish man named Bjorn Samstrom was the first person charged with rape-via-the-internet. This was because Samstrom blackmailed minors into performing sexual acts for him over a computer network, which would normally be prosecuted under other laws—however, Swedish laws notably do not require physical penetration for a rape conviction, and Samstrom was charged for rape by Swedish authorities.

== Criticism ==
Cybersex sometimes attracts ridicule when the partners have little verifiable knowledge about each other. For many, the primary goal of cybersex is the plausible simulation of sexual activity, with knowledge of the other not being a priority, which has been criticized as the emptying out of embodied relations.

In the words of Carkeek and James (1992):

Without continuing to draw off our historically ambivalent faith in embodied relations, techno-sex quickly becomes hollow, unsatisfying, no more erotic than collecting answers to what-are-your-measurements questions. And herein lies the rub, or so we will argue. By continuing to draw off that ambivalent faith, techno-sex and the many other practices of disembodying interaction contribute to a changing and increasingly abstracted dominant ontology of embodiment.

Privacy concerns are a difficulty with cybersex, since participants may log or record the interaction without the other's knowledge, and possibly disclose it to others or the public.

There is disagreement over whether cybersex is a form of infidelity, though this sentiment has shifted towards an affirmative. While it does not involve physical contact, critics claim that the powerful emotions involved can cause marital stress, especially when cybersex culminates in an Internet romance. In several known cases, Internet adultery became the grounds for which a couple divorced. Therapists reported a growing number of patients addicted to this activity in 2002, and treated it as a form of both Internet addiction and sexual addiction, with the standard problems associated with addictive behaviors.

== See also ==
- Cybersex addiction
- Computer-mediated communication
- How to Be a Cyber-Lovah
- Internet pornography
- Sexting
- Sextech
- Teledildonics
- Webcam model
