= AEBN =

Internet pornography company

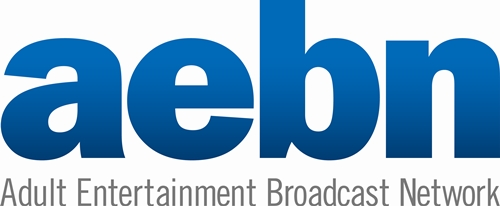
- Website type: Pornographic streaming video
- Available in: English
- Founded: 1999; 27 years ago
- Headquarters: Charlotte, North Carolina
- Website: aebn.net
- Registration: Optional (pay-per-minute)
- Current status: Active

AEBN, short for Adult Entertainment Broadcast Network, is an Internet pornography company that specializes in delivering material through streaming video in a video on demand format. Subsidiaries include PornoTube.

== History ==
AEBN was formed in 1999. At the time, video-streaming technology was still in its infancy. AEBN developed and launched an adult Video-on-Demand service that now serves as a widely recognized model of content delivery for the adult industry. AEBN's pay-per-minute model is a standard in online pornography. In 2004, AEBN began offering its theater templates in languages other than English.

Headquartered in Charlotte, North Carolina, AEBN offers more than 100,000 titles and includes material from at least 1,500 different studios with 10 million subscribers worldwide, as of 2011.

== Studio and other acquisitions ==
In January 2007, AEBN announced a merger with NakedSword.com, one of the largest gay Internet pornography companies on the Web. The merger gave AEBN a windfall of gay content from studios such as COLT and Falcon, as well as a strong brand name in the gay market. NakedSword retained its separate headquarters in San Francisco, California, giving AEBN offices on both the east and west coasts.

In 2009, AEBN merged with another gay adult company, Raging Stallion Studios, and its sister label, Pistol Media. The merger also included Pistol Media's Gunzblazing affiliate program. Raging Stallion Studios is also based in San Francisco and is one of the world's largest producers of gay adult films.

On December 19, 2010, AEBN purchased Falcon Studios for an undisclosed sum.

AEBN merged Falcon Studios and Raging Stallion, although the company said that both brands would remain distinct and AEBN's output would remain constant at 60 DVD titles per year, with 40 originating from Raging Stallion. Falcon CEO James Hansen would remain with the company as the chief financial officer of Falcon Studios.

== Other ventures ==
AEBN launched Xobile in April 2005. Xobile made adult material available on mobile devices. Xobile was known for its "PornMyPortable" campaign, which offered adult material specifically made to work with mobile entertainment devices like the iPod and Sony's PSP. On March 5, 2010, AEBN announced the relaunch of its Xobile mobile porn platform that included a "massive redesign."

AEBN announced plans to host the first annual VOD Awards in 2005. The awards' winners are chosen based on the viewing habits of the sites' users and on per-minute sales in theaters during the preceding calendar year.

Early in 2006, AEBN started xPeeps.com, an x-rated dating site that garnered 300,000 users in its first eight months. In 2007, AEBN created a dating site similar to xPeeps but specifically for the fetish community called SocialKink.com.

In 2008 AEBN debuted a product called RealTouch, a sleeve fitted with "belts, jets, heating elements and other gadgetry" that fits over the penis and synchronizes sensations to a specially produced online video. Representatives for the company demonstrated the device at the 2009 AVN Adult Entertainment Expo in Las Vegas and it was released in November 2009.

== Awards ==
VOD Awards
- Website: https://www.aebn.com/

=== VOD Awards ===
Since 2006 AEBN has its own award program to acknowledge videos, performers, and studios based on their popularity as selected by their customer base. The awards recognize "each year's most popular films and stars based on viewing habits of the millions who visit the company's network of VOD theaters". Nominations are based on sales (measured in minutes of video viewing) for each calendar year. "Customers are the only voters for the VOD Awards," said AEBN's VP of Sales and Marketing, Jerry Anders. "They voted with every minute they watched...".

The awards cover a range of genres along with an award for Studio of the Year. Categories include: Performer of the Year, Best Newcomer, Best Overall Movie, Amateur, BDSM, Feature, International, Lesbian, Series, and Transsexual.
