= Sarah Jamie Lewis =

Privacy and anonymity researcher; technologist

Sarah Jamie Lewis is an anonymity and privacy researcher with published research in the fields of deanonymization and e-voting. She is the executive director of Open Privacy Research Society, a Canadian nonprofit organization specialized in privacy research and advocacy. In 2019, Lewis in collaboration with researchers from the University of Melbourne and UCLouvain published details of critical vulnerabilities impacting electronic voting systems in Switzerland and Australia.

Lewis has also researched the privacy protocols (or lack thereof) of sex toys. She has been cited in academic research regarding their security. She believes there is a lack of legal framework related to the field of onion dildonics, stating that "We are currently sprinting into this world of connected sex toys and connected sex tech without regards to what consent, privacy, or security means in that context..." and recommending "100% encrypted peer-to-peer cyber sex over Tor hidden services." More generally, due to the litigious environment in which computer security researchers operate, she has opted to build bespoke secure systems rather than fix broken systems.

In 2017, Lewis self-published and edited a collection of essays entitled Queer Privacy, focussing on the effects of technology on marginalised communities; it is written by people in queer and trans communities, and discusses topics like media representation. She describes herself as a "Vegan Lesbian, Queer Anarchist" and lives in Vancouver, British Columbia.

== Bibliography ==
- Queer Privacy: Essay from the Margins of Society (2017; self-published)

== See also ==
- Crypto-anarchism
- Tor (anonymity network)
- Dark web
- Ricochet (software)
