= Womanizer (pressure wave vibrator) =

Pressure wave vibrator for sexual stimulation

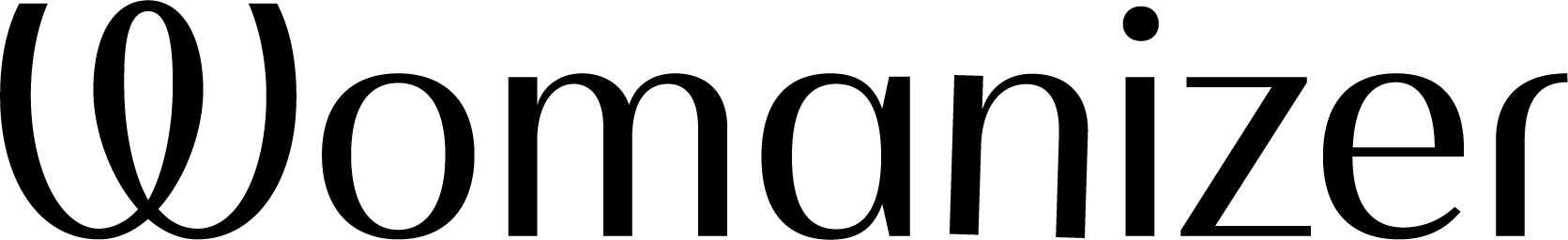
- Product type: Sex toys
- Produced by: Lovehoney Group
- Country: Germany
- Introduced: 2014; 12 years ago
- Markets: Worldwide
- Website: womanizer.com

The Womanizer is a series of sex toys in the form of a vibrator that are used for sexual stimulation of the female genital area. As part of the Lovehoney Group, Womanizer manufactures pleasure products based on patented "Pleasure Air Technology".

== History ==
The first Womanizer clitoral massager was created in 2014 in Bavaria, Germany by Michael Lenke. Lenke was inspired by a study concluding that about half of women experience difficulty in orgasming. The development process took about two years and his wife Brigitte helped to test the prototypes. Lenke’s first prototypes worked with modified aquarium pumps designed to create clitoral massage and suction. In the same year, the company launched its first product, W100 with patented Pleasure Air Technology. From the following year, Womanizer gained international distribution. The W100 was recognized as the “Best new female product of the year” at the ETO-Awards 2015.

In 2017, Johannes Plettenberg became the founder and CEO of Womanizer Group Management GmbH.

In 2018, Womanizer merged with the Canadian sex toy manufacturer We-Vibe. WOW Tech Group was formed through the merger.

At EAN Erotix Award 2019, the brand was recognized as Best Luxury Product Line and as Highest Mainstream Appeal.

At the ETO Awards 2020, Womanizer became the Best Luxury Brand.

In 2020, Womanizer, in collaboration with Lunette, launched the Menstrubation Study, a clinical study to determine whether masturbation can relieve menstrual pain.

In 2021, WOW Tech Group merged with pleasure product manufacturer and distributor Lovehoney to form Lovehoney Group. Womanizer is part of the Lovehoney Group’s brand portfolio. In the same year, brand launched the “Pleasure Fund”, which involves an investment of 250 thousand euros in research in the field of female sexual health and sexual pleasure.

Womanizer won “Best of Best” in the “Product Brand of the Year” category at the German Brand Award 2021.

== Technology ==
According to reviews by Berliner Zeitung, Glamour Magazine and Vice Magazine Womanizer's "Pleasure Air Technology" is considered "a first-of-its-kind tech in the sex toy market". Instead of a simple vibration mechanism, the Womanizer relies on air vibrations. It is equipped with a small air window that opens and closes as quickly as a hummingbird's wing beat.

The patented Pleasure Air Technology uses changes in air pressure to gently massage the sensitive clitoral nerve endings without contact, which means that the 8000 nerve endings in the clitoris are never overstimulated.

The brand also has other patented features such as Autopilot and Smart Silence. In 2019, Womanizer launched a product featuring Pleasure Air Technology stimulation for the clitoris and internal vibrations for the G-spot.

The Womanizer OG features Pleasure Air technology for the G-spot as well as internal vibrations. Womanizer also focuses on sustainability with patented Premium Eco sex toy made from biodegradable Biolene materials.

== Reception ==
The Swiss Blick.ch calls Womanizer “the world's best-selling sex toy for women”.

Famous British singer Lily Allen mentioned Womanizer in her 2018 memoir My Thoughts Exactly. She joined Womanizer as Chief Liberation Officer from 2020 to 2023. Womanizer and Lily Allen also collaborated in creating the special edition Lily Allen Liberty designed to be discreet and travel ready. At PR Week Global Awards 2021, Liberty Lily Allen became a finalist.
