= Absolute Steel =

Norwegian band

- Origin: Larvik, Norway
- Genres: Heavy metal
- Years active: 1999–present
- Label: Black Lotus Records
- Members: K2; Andy Boss; Dave Bomb; Dr. Schmutz; Rick Hagan
- Website: www.absolutesteel.com

Absolute Steel is a Norwegian heavy metal band from Larvik. Formed in 1999, the band's founding members were Andy Boss (lead guitar), Dave Bomb (lead guitar) and K2 (vocals). Throughout the late 1990s they played live performances and developed a heavy metal party band style that caught the attention of Edgerunner Records, a local heavy metal label. In 2002, the label released The Fair Bitch Project, the band's debut recording. Performances after the release further defined their style by featuring female strippers and pyrotechnics.

A second Edgerunner release was planned, but the label folded before it could be issued. The recording was self produced and the band printed and distributed 200 copies in an attempt to attract another label.

Black Lotus, a Greek label heard the recording and signed the band in 2005. Released as WomaniZer, the recording was distributed worldwide and the label plans on remastering The Fair Bitch Project and releasing that as well.

== Discography ==
- Absolute Steel, 1999 (demo)
- "We Sentence You To Death (Even If You're Innocent)", 2001 (single)
- The Fair Bitch Project, 2002 (album)
- WomaniZer, 2004 (album, re-issue 2005)

== Line-up ==
- K2 - vocals
- Andy Boss - guitars
- Dave Bomb - guitars
- Dr. Schmutz - bass
- Rick Hagan - drums
