= Dildo =

Sex toy, often phallic

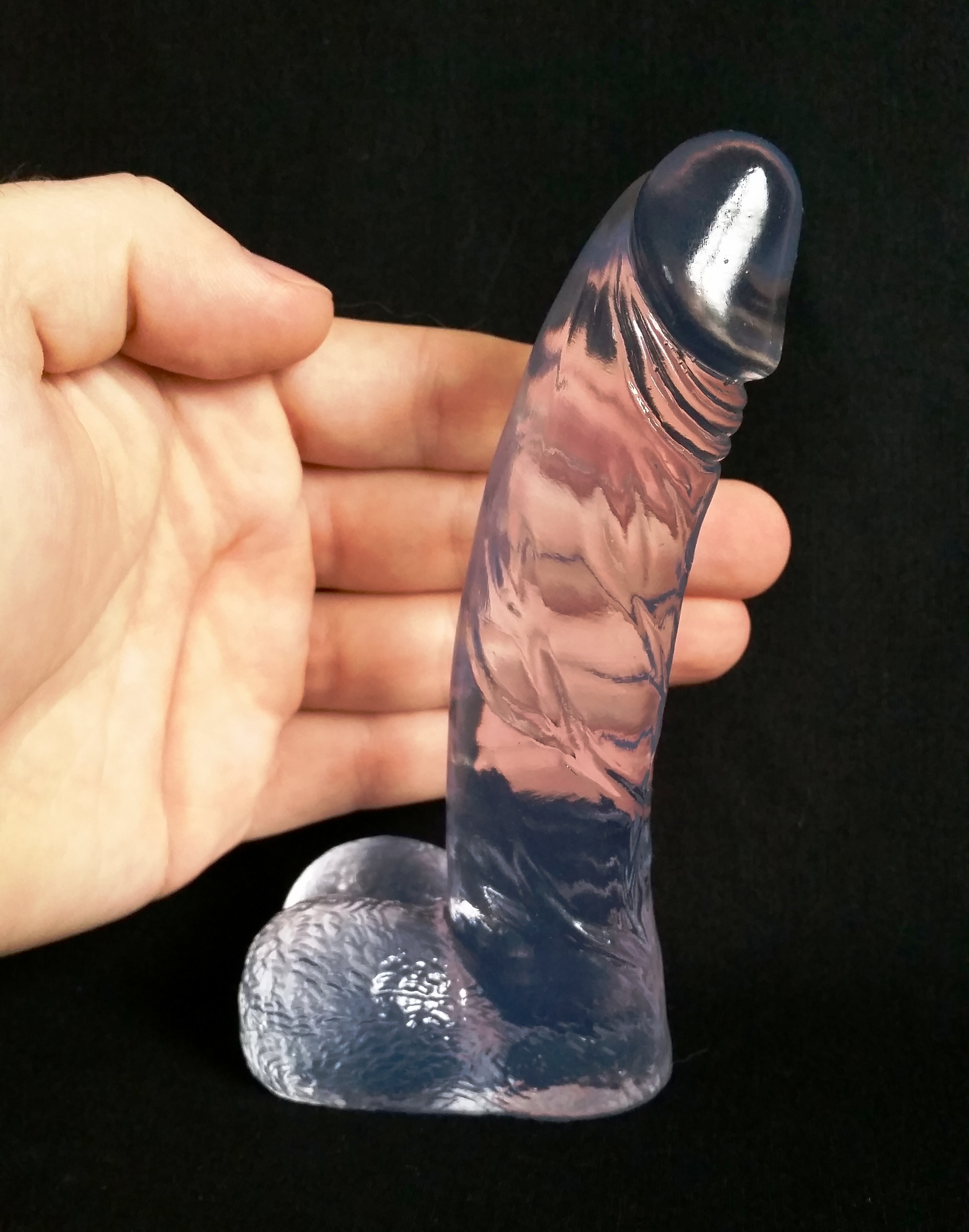
A 5.5-inch (14 cm) clear thermoplastic elastomer ("jelly") dildo

A dildo is a sex toy, often explicitly phallic in appearance, intended for sexual penetration or other sexual activity during masturbation or with sex partners. Dildos are made from a number of solid materials. The shape and size are typically that of a human penis, but there is a wide variation to accommodate the needs of different users.

== Etymology ==
The etymology of the word dildo was long considered unclear, but the third edition of the Oxford English Dictionary concluded in 2018 that the word originates in nonsense syllables common in early-modern popular ballads (not dissimilar to the still-familiar nursery rhyme phrase "hey diddle diddle"), which came to be used as a coy euphemism for dildos. The phrase "Dil Doul", referring to a man's penis, appears in the seventeenth-century folk ballad "The Maids Complaint for want of a Dil Doul". The song was among the many in the library of Samuel Pepys.

Other theories that have previously circulated speculate that the word dildo originally referred to the phallus-shaped peg used to lock an oar in position on a dory (small boat). It would be inserted into a hole on the side of the boat, and is very similar in shape to the modern toy. The sex toy might take its name from this sailing tool, which also lends its name to the town of Dildo and the nearby Dildo Island in Newfoundland, Canada. Others suggest the word is a corruption of Italian diletto "delight".

According to the OED, one of the word's first appearances in English was in Thomas Nashe's The Choise of Valentines or the Merie Ballad of Nash his Dildo (c. 1593), in the sentence "Curse Eunuke dilldo, senceless, counterfet, | Who sooth maie fill, but neuer can begett" ('curse dildo, that eunuch, lacking feelings, and counterfeit, who can certainly fill [a vagina], but can never beget [children]').

=== Terms in other languages ===
The word dildo appears in several other languages, originating as a loanword from English. In the past, other names have been used since antiquity.

An olisbos (pl. olisboi) is a classical term for a dildo, from Ancient Greek olisbos (ὄλισβος), originally a dildo that was usually made of leather. In French, the word godemiché refers to a dildo in the shape of a penis with scrotum.

In some modern languages, the names for dildo can be more descriptive, creative or subtle—note, for instance, Bengali dalda (ডাল্ডা), Hindi darśildō (दर्शिल्दो), Russian falloimitator (фаллоимитатор, literally "phallic imitator"), Spanish consolador ("consoler"), and Welsh cala goeg ("fake penis").

== Description and uses ==
=== General ===
A dildo is an object usually designed for sexual penetration of the vagina, mouth, or anus, and is usually solid and phallic in shape. Penis prosthetic aids, known as "extensions", are not considered dildos. Some include penis-shaped items clearly designed for vaginal penetration, even if they are not true approximations of a penis. An anal dildo is intended for repeated anal penetration, to be distinguished from a butt plug which is flanged with the intent of remaining in place. People of all genders and sexual orientations use these devices for masturbation or other sexual activity.

Mahogany wood dildo

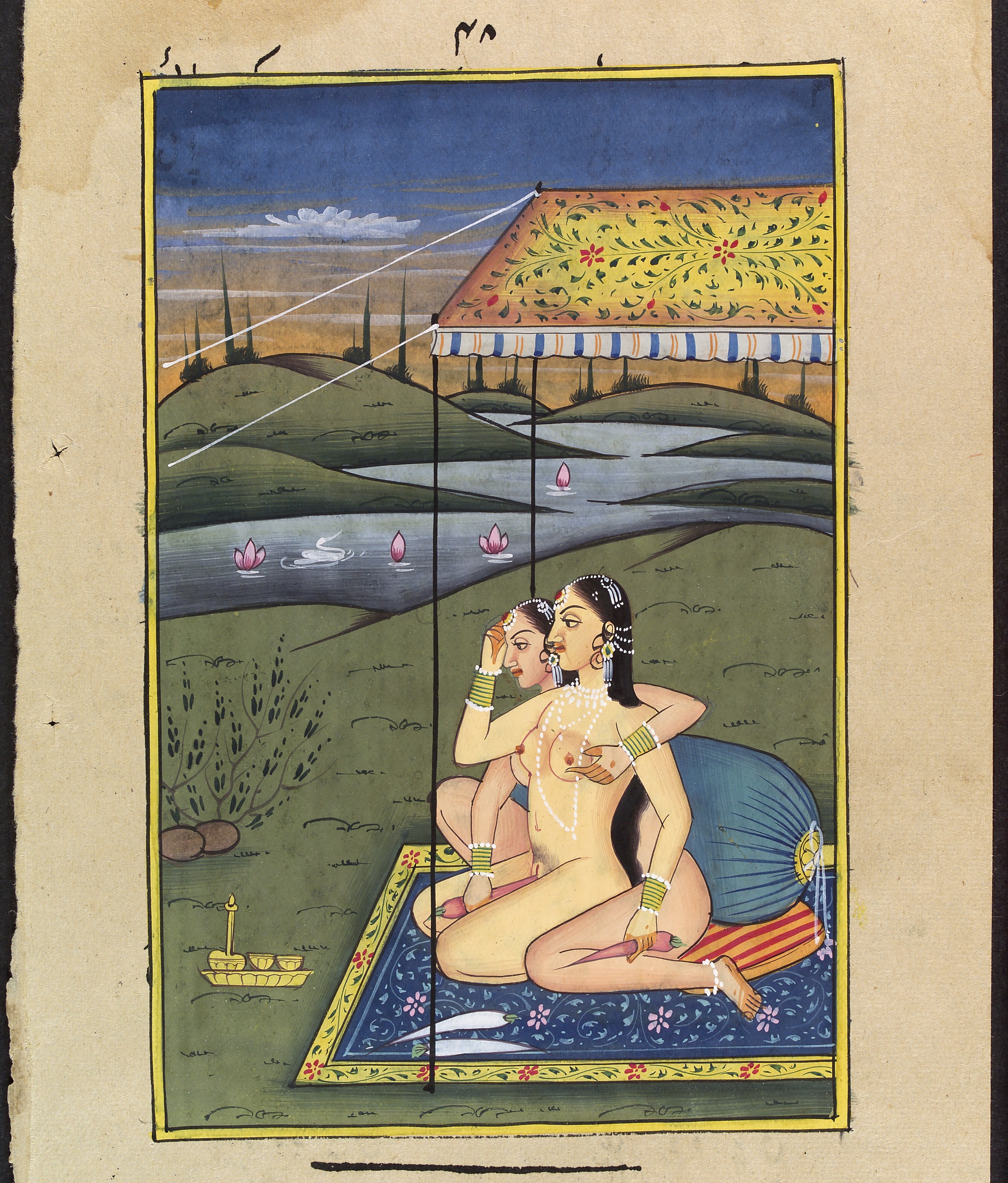
Two women embracing and using carrots as dildoes in an act of food play, 19th-century India.

=== Materials ===
Phallus-shaped vegetables and fruits, such as bananas, zucchini, eggplants, carrots, or other food items, such as hot dogs or other types of sausages, have been used as dildos in a form of food play. Any object of sufficient firmness and shape can be used like a dildo. Pure silicone is considered one of the safest materials for dildos, for both anal and vaginal use cases, as many other materials are porous and typical cleaning methods may not remove all bacteria.

=== Design ===
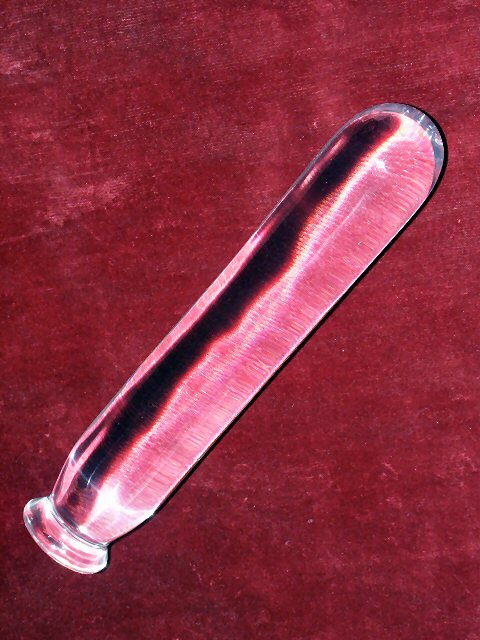
Acrylic dildo shaped like a torpedo

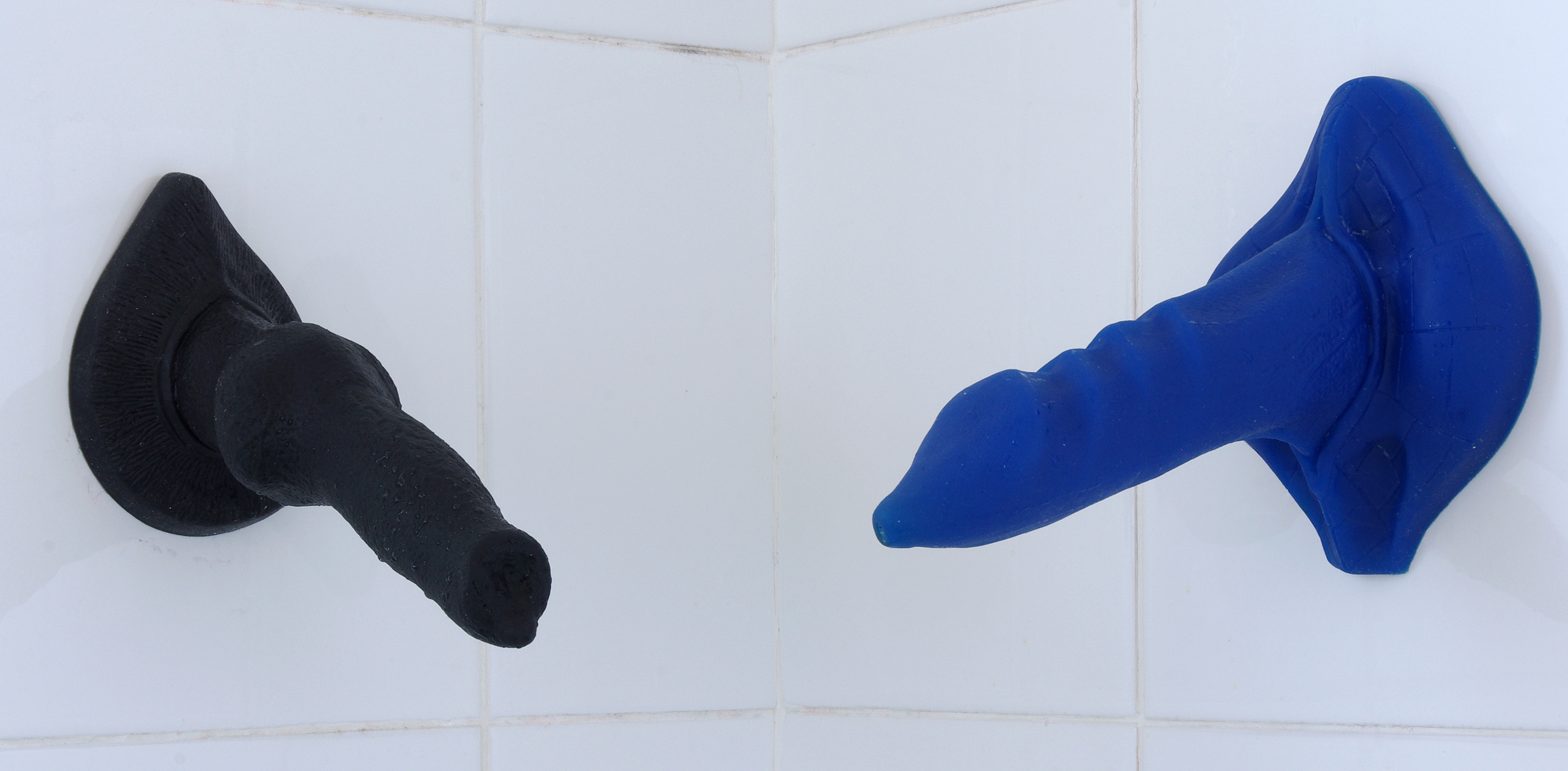
An example of a dildo inspired by an animalistic features

Conventionally, many dildos are shaped like a human penis with varying degrees of detail, while many others are made to resemble the phallus of animals. Not all, however, are fashioned to reproduce the male anatomy meticulously, and dildos come in a wide variety of shapes. They may resemble figures, or simply include practical creations and features, mainly physical (e.g. spikes, rings, knots, tentacles, textures) and electrical (e.g. vibration and heating), which offer more stimulation than conventional designs. In Japan, many dildos are created to resemble animals or cartoon characters, such as Hello Kitty, so that they may be sold as conventional toys, thus avoiding obscenity laws. Some dildos have textured surfaces to enhance sexual pleasure, and others have macrophallic dimensions including over 12 inches (30.5 cm) long.

Starting in 2012, 3D models of dildos became available for printing by individuals, offering size personalization. This, however, did not take off at that time, in part due to the porosity issue of the materials used (which is mainly a problem if no condom is used over the dildo). Some websites have continued to exist however. Besides printing them at home, it is also possible to print it off at a fablab or makerspace.

=== Uses ===
Most dildos are intended for vaginal or anal penetration and stimulation, for masturbation on oneself or by a sexual partner. Dildos have fetishistic value as well, and may be used in other ways, such as touching one's own or another's skin in various places, often during foreplay or as an act of dominance and submission. If of appropriate sizes, they can be used as gags, for oral penetration for a sort of artificial fellatio. Dildos, particularly specially designed ones, may be used to stimulate the G-spot area.

A dildo designed for anal insertion that then remains in place is usually referred to as a butt plug. A dildo intended for repeated anal penetration (thrusting) is typically referred to as an 'anal dildo'. Anal dildos and butt plugs generally have a large base to avoid accidental complete insertion into the rectum, which may require medical removal. Double-ended dildos, which are dildos that have a shaft on either end, are used by two partners to share a single dildo, where each partner takes an end and receives stimulation. In the case of both shafts pointing at the same direction, they are also used by some women for simultaneous vaginal and anal stimulation.

Some dildos are designed to be worn in a harness, sometimes called a strap-on harness or a strap-on dildo, or to be worn inside the vagina (then called strapless dildo or "strapless strap-on dildo"), sometimes with externally attached vibrating devices. Strap-on dildos may be double-ended, meant to be worn by users who want to experience vaginal or anal penetration while also penetrating a partner. They may also be used for anally penetrating men. If a female penetrates a male, the act is known as pegging.

Some contemporary dildos incorporate app-controlled features, including some models manufactured by companies like Lovense. Other types of dildos include those designed to be fitted to the face of one party, inflatable dildos, and dildos with suction cups attached to the base (sometimes referred to as a wall mount or "flare"). Other types of harness mounts for dildos (besides strapping to the groin) include thigh mount, face mount, or furniture mounting straps.

== History ==
Dildos in one form or another have existed widely in history. Artifacts from the Upper Paleolithic of a type called bâton de commandement have been speculated to have been used for sexual purposes. Few archaeologists consider these items as sex toys, but archaeologist Timothy Taylor put it, "Looking at the size, shape, and—some cases—explicit symbolism of the ice age batons, it seems disingenuous to avoid the most obvious and straightforward interpretation. But it has been avoided."

The first dildos were made of stone, tar, wood, bone, ivory, limestone, teeth, and other materials that could be shaped as penises and that were firm enough to be used as penetrative sex toys. Scientists believe that a 20-centimeter siltstone phallus from the Upper Palaeolithic period 30,000 years ago, found in Hohle Fels Cave near Ulm, Germany, may have been used as a dildo. Prehistoric double-headed dildos have been found which date anywhere from 13 to 19,000 years ago. Various paintings from ancient Egypt around 3000 BCE feature dildos being used in a variety of ways. In the Middle Ages, a plant called the "cantonese groin" was soaked in hot water to enlarge and harden for women to use as dildos. Dildo-like breadsticks, known as olisbokollikes (sing. olisbokollix), were known in Ancient Greece prior to the 5th century BC. In Italy during the 15th century, dildos were made of leather, wood, or stone. Chinese women in the 15th century used dildos made of lacquered wood with textured surfaces, and were sometimes buried with them. Nashe's early-1590s work The Choise of Valentines mentions a dildo made from glass. Dildos also appeared in 17th- and 18th-century Japan, in shunga. In these erotic novels, women are shown enthusiastically buying dildos, some made out of water buffalo horns.

Dildos were not just used for sexual pleasure. Examples from the Eurasia Ice Age (40,000-10,000 BCE) and Roman era are speculated to have been used for defloration rituals. This is not the only example of dildos being used for ritual ceremonies, as people in 4000 BCE Pakistan used them to worship the god Shiva.

Many references to dildos exist in the historical and ethnographic literature. Haberlandt, for example, illustrates single and double-ended wooden dildos from late 19th-century Zanzibar. With the invention of modern materials, making dildos of different shapes, sizes, colors and textures became more practical.

=== Ancient Greece ===
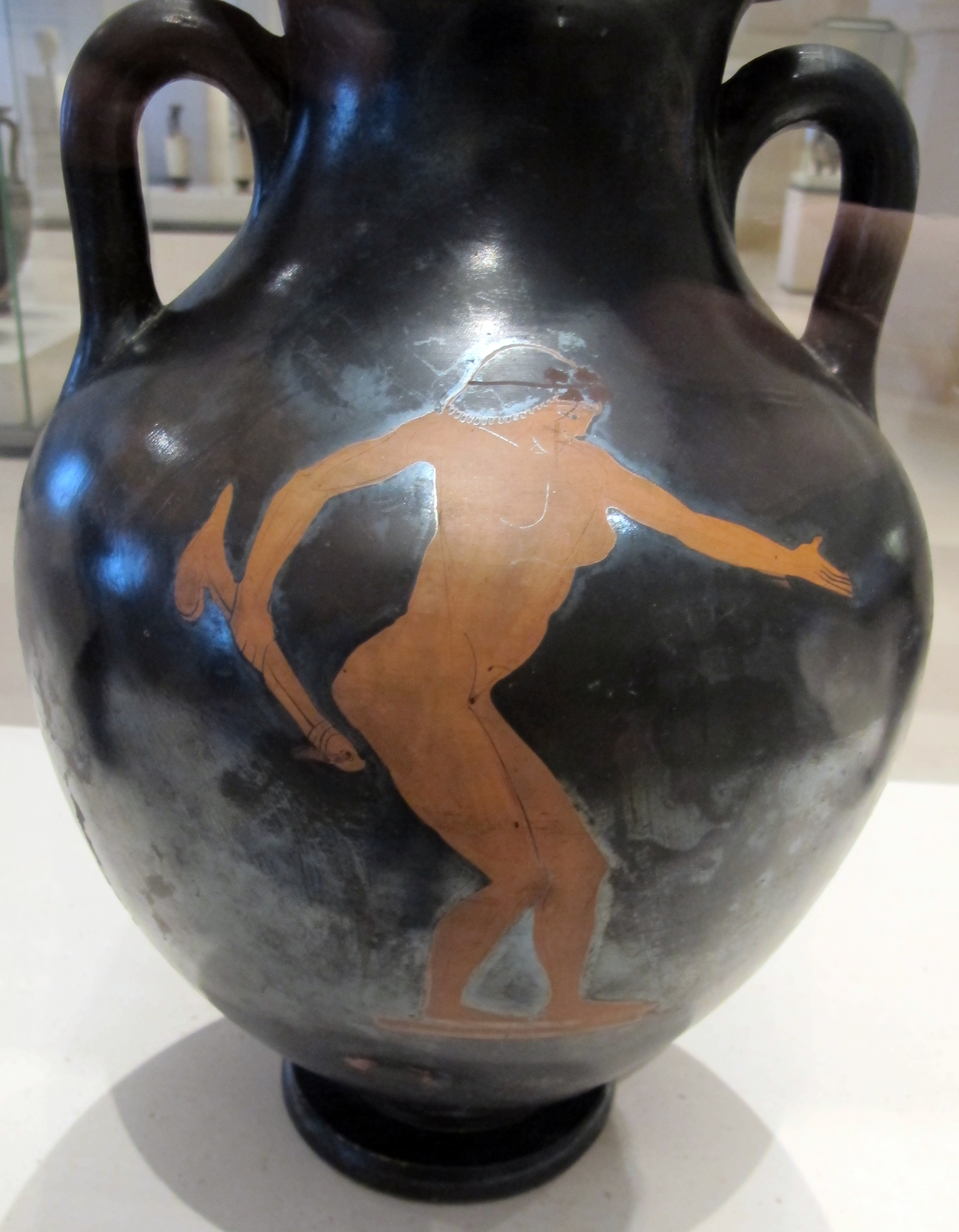
A woman with a dildo. Red figure amphora attributed to the Flying-Angel Painter c. 490 BC; City of Paris Museum of Fine Arts

Dildos may be seen in some examples of ancient Greek vase art. Some pieces show their use in group sex or in solitary female masturbation. One vessel, of about the sixth century BCE, depicts a scene in which a woman bends over to perform oral sex on a man, while another man is about to thrust a dildo into her anus.

They are mentioned several times in Aristophanes' comedy of 411 BCE, Lysistrata.

LYSISTRATA
And so, girls, when fucking time comes... not the faintest whiff of it anywhere, right? From the time those Milesians betrayed us, we can't even find our eight-fingered leather dildos. At least they'd serve as a sort of flesh-replacement for our poor cunts... So, then! Would you like me to find some mechanism by which we could end this war?

Herodas' short comic play, Mime VI, written in the 3rd century BCE, is about a woman called Metro, anxious to discover from a friend where she recently acquired a dildo.

METRO
I beg you, don't lie,
dear Corrioto: who was the man who stitched for you this bright red dildo?

She eventually discovers the maker to be a man called Kerdon, who hides his trade by the front of being a cobbler, and leaves to seek him out. Metro and Kerdon are main characters in the next play in the sequence, Mime VII, when she visits his shop.

Page duBois, a classicist and feminist theorist, suggests that dildos were present in Greek art because the ancient Greek male imagination found it difficult to conceive of sex taking place without penetration. Therefore, female masturbation or sex between women required an artificial phallus to be used. Greek dildos were often made out of leather stuffed with wool in order to give it varying degrees of thickness and firmness. They were often lubricated with olive oil, and used for sexual practice and other activities. The Greeks were also one of the first groups to use the term "toy" in reference to a dildo.

=== Talmud ===
The Talmud's Avodah Zarah Tractate records the interpretation which Rav Yosef bar Hiyya gave to the Biblical reference of King Asa of Judah having "(...) deposed his grandmother Maakah from her position as Queen Mother, because she had made a repulsive image for the worship of Asherah. Asa cut it down and burned it in the Kidron Valley". According to Rav Yosef, Maakah had installed "a kind of male organ" on her Asherah image "in order to fulfill her desire", and was "mating with it every day". Rav Yosef's words are quoted by Rashi in his own interpretation of 2 Chronicles 15:16. Whether or not Rav Yosef was right in attributing this practice to the Biblical queen, his speaking of it indicates that Jews in 3rd-century Mesopotamia were familiar with such devices.

=== Early modern period ===
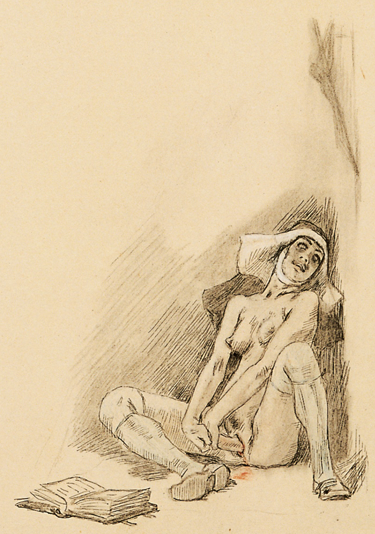
19th-century satire, depicting the use of a dildo by Saint Teresa (Félicien Rops)

In the early 1590s, the English playwright Thomas Nashe wrote a poem known as The Choise of Valentines, Nashe's Dildo or The Merrie Ballad of Nashe his Dildo. This was not printed at the time, due to its obscenity, but it was still widely circulated and made Nashe's name notorious. The poem describes a visit to a brothel by a man called Tomalin; he is searching for his sweetheart, Francis, who has become a prostitute. The only way he can see her is to hire her. However, she resorts to using a glass dildo as he finds himself unable to perform sexually to her satisfaction.

Dildos are humorously mentioned in Act IV, scene iv of Shakespeare's The Winter's Tale. This play and Ben Jonson's play The Alchemist (1610) are typically cited as the first use of the word in publication (Nashe's Merrie Ballad was not published until 1899).

John Wilmot, the seventeenth-century English libertine, published his poem Signor Dildo in 1673. During the Parliamentary session of that year, objections were raised to the proposed marriage of James, Duke of York, brother of the King and heir to the throne, to Mary of Modena, an Italian Catholic princess. An address was presented to King Charles on 3 November, foreseeing the dangerous consequences of marriage to a Catholic, and urging him to put a stop to any planned wedding "...to the unspeakable Joy and Comfort of all Your loyal Subjects". Wilmot's response was Signior Dildo (You ladies all of merry England), (Note: Archived 2003-10-15 at the Wayback Machine) a mock address anticipating the "solid" advantages of a Catholic marriage, namely the wholesale importation of Italian dildos, to the unspeakable joy and comfort of all the ladies of England:

You ladies all of merry England
Who have been to kiss the Duchess's hand,
Pray, did you not lately observe in the show
A noble Italian called Signor Dildo? ...

A rabble of pricks who were welcomed before,
Now finding the porter denied them the door,
Maliciously waited his coming below
And inhumanly fell on Signor Dildo ...

This ballad was subsequently added to by other authors, and became so popular that Signor became a term for a dildo. In the epilogue to The Mistaken Husband (1674), by John Dryden, an actress complains:

To act with young boys is loving without men.
What will not poor forsaken women try?
When man's not near, the Signior must supply.

Signor Dildo was set to music by Michael Nyman for the 2005 biopic The Libertine.

Many other works of bawdy and satirical English literature of the period deal with the subject. Dildoides: A Burlesque Poem (London, 1706), attributed to Samuel Butler, is a mock lament to a collection of dildos that had been seized and publicly burnt by the authorities. Examples of anonymous works include The Bauble, a tale (London, 1721) and Monsieur Thing's Origin: or Seignor D---o's Adventures in London (London, 1722). In 1746, Henry Fielding wrote The Female Husband: or the surprising history of Mrs Mary, alias Mr. George Hamilton, in which a woman poses as a man and uses a dildo. This was a fictionalized account of the story of Mary Hamilton. The 1748 chapbook A Spy on Mother Midnight depicts an innocent country girl who travels with a dildo and a copy of Rochester's dildo poem in her luggage.

The Wellcome Collection, a London museum of medicine, owns several dildos made from wood, cloth or ivory, including one ivory example possibly made in France in the 18th century.

=== 20th century ===
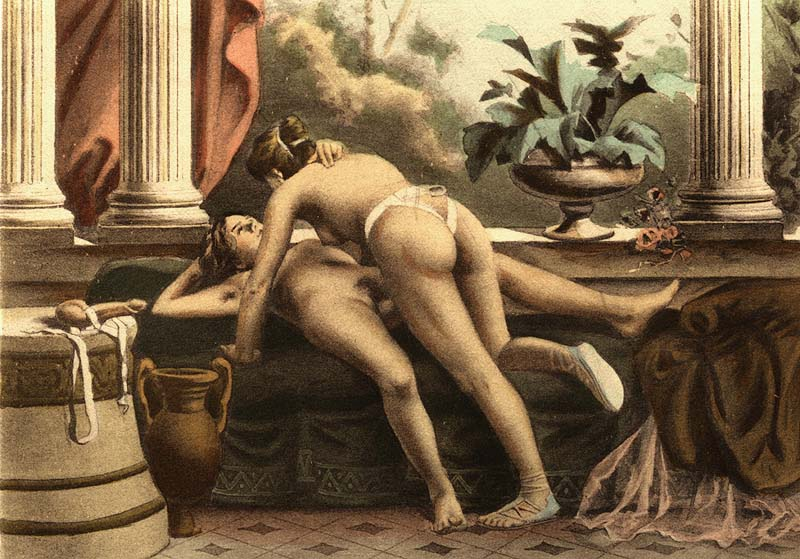
Dildo being used by two women. Lithograph from De Figuris Veneris (1906) by Édouard-Henri Avril

Dildos are obliquely referred to in Saul Bellow's novel The Adventures of Augie March (1953): "....he had brought me along to a bachelor's stag where two naked acrobatic girls did stunts with false tools". A dildo called Steely Dan III from Yokohama appears in the William S. Burroughs novel The Naked Lunch (1959). The rock band Steely Dan took their name from it.

=== 21st century ===
In 2017, dark web privacy researcher Sarah Jamie Lewis connected a vibrator (using reverse engineering) to Tor, the anonymity network, in a proof of concept demonstrating the applicability of privacy technology after the fact.

=== Legal and ethical issues ===
The possession and sale of dildos is illegal in some jurisdictions, such as India. Until recently, many southern states and some Great Plains states in the United States banned the sale of dildos completely, either directly or through laws regulating "obscene devices". In 2007, a federal appeals court upheld Alabama's law prohibiting the sale of sex toys. The law, the Anti-Obscenity Enforcement Act of 1998, was also upheld by the Supreme Court of Alabama on September 11, 2009. There are even instances where dildos have been seized and burned at customs.

In February 2008, a United States federal appeals court overturned a Texas statute banning the sales of dildos and other sexual toys, deeming such a statute as violating the Constitution's 14th Amendment on the right to privacy. The appeals court cited Lawrence v. Texas, where the Supreme Court of the United States in 2003 struck down bans on consensual sex between gay couples, as unconstitutionally aiming at "enforcing a public moral code by restricting private intimate conduct." Similar statutes have been struck down in Kansas and Colorado. Alabama is the only state where a law prohibiting the sale of sex toys remains on the books.

Some Conservative Christians believe that the use of sex toys is immoral. The Southern Baptist preacher Dan Ireland has been an outspoken critic of such devices and has fought to ban them on religious and ethical grounds. Ireland led an effort to outlaw dildos and other sex toys in Alabama to "...protect the public against themselves." Other Christian religious leaders such as Evangelical Lutheran Church of America pastor Heidi Johnson, who founded a student group on sexuality at Duke Divinity School, have a positive view of sex toys in Christian sexuality.

== See also ==
- Artificial vagina
- Bread dildo
- Double penetration dildo
- Hegar dilators
- Strap-on dildo
- Vibrator

== Bibliography ==
- Haberlandt, M. 1899. "Conträre Sexual-Erscheinungen bei der Neger-Bevölkerung Zanzibars", Zeitschrift für Ethnologie, 31: 668–670.
- Marshack, A. 1972. The Roots of Civilization: The Cognitive Beginnings of Man's First Art, Symbol and Notation.. New York: McGraw-Hill. ISBN 978-0-297-99449-7.
- Taylor, T. 1996. The Prehistory of Sex: Four Million Years of Human Sexual Culture. New York: Bantam. ISBN 978-0-553-09694-1.
- Vasey, PL. 1998. "Intimate Sexual Relations in Prehistory: Lessons from Japanese Macaques", World Archaeology 29(03):407–425.
- Wagner, Peter (1987). "Chapter 2: The discourse on sex - or sex as discourse: eighteenth-century medical and paramedical erotica". In Porter, Roy; Sebastian Rousseau, George (eds.). Sexual Underworlds of the Enlightenment. Manchester University Press. ISBN 978-0-7190-1961-6.
