= Stahl Stenslie =

Norwegian-born artist

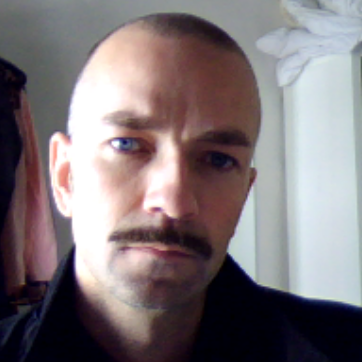
- Stahl in 2008
- Born: Ståle Stenslie; 27 November 1965; Elverum, Norway
- Occupations: media artist, researcher, professor
- Writing career
- Genre: experimental media art
- Notable works: cyberSM (1993) sense:less (1996); Solve et Coagula (1997); World Ripple (2008); The Blind Theatre (2009)

Stahl Stenslie is a Norwegian born artist working with cognition and perception manipulative projects. He has produced and exhibited interactive media artworks including cyberSM (1993), sense:less (1996), Solve et Coagula(1997), The Leap, World Ripple (2008) and The Blind Theatre (2009).

== Education ==
Oslo School of Architecture and Design (PhD), Statens Kunstakademi (Oslo, Norway), The Düsseldorf Art Academy (Düsseldorf, Germany), Academy of Media Arts Köln (Cologne, Germany)

== Exhibits ==
2009

- Theatre of the Blind, Nationaltheateret, Oslo
- Walking the Line, performances, SKC center, Beograd, Serbia
- Serpents Tongue, performance with Kate Pendry, SKC center, Beograd, Serbia

2008

- World Ripple # 2, Touch Me Festival, Zagreb, Croatia
- Artgasm, Touch Me Festival, Zagreb, Croatia
- Artgasm, Beton Halla, Beograd, Serbia
- Chador Touch; World Ripple, Bagh-e-Tehran Park, Tehran, Iran
- Invisible Sculptures: World Ripple, The Association of Norwegian Sculptors, Oslo, Norway
- Ecstatic Bodies, Gallery 13 Kubikova, Bratislava, Slovakia (13m3.sk/)

2006

- Solve et Coagula touch suit, Spiel mit Technik, Deutsches Technikmuseum Berlin

2005

- S.U.F.I. suicide fashion, Touch Me festival, Zagreb, Croatia

2004

- Post Digital Lunch, Dutch Electronic Art Festival (DEAF), V2, Rotterdam, Holland
- Inter_Skin II, The Nova Gallery, Zagreb, Croatia

2003

- Erotogod 3.5 at Dutch Electronic Art Festival, V2, Rotterdam, Holland
- Erotogod, Atelier Nord, Oslo, Norway

2002

- Tactile technology, cyberSM, Deutsche Hygiene Museum, Dresden, Germany
- Stunt Club, Kunstnernes Hus, Oslo, Norway
- Suicidal Fashion, Break 21, Dead or Alive @ Kapelica, Ljubljana, Slovenia

2001

- Erotogod, Henie Onstad Kunstsenter, Norway
- CyberSM, Deutsches Hygiene Museum, Dresden, Germany

2000

- The Leap, at The Norwegian Nationaltheater, Oslo, The Ibsen Festival 2000
- "Wie man sieht", Museum Ludwig, Cologne, Germany
- "Stoneproof", Økomuseum Boarderland, Halden, Norway

1999

- The Leap, The Artists House, Oslo Norway

1997

- Solve et Coagula, Ars Electronica, Linz, Austria
- 5th International Biennial, Istanbul, Turkey
- e~on, Kunstnernes Hus, Oslo, Norway

1992 -96

- DEAF, Dutch Electronic Art Festival, Rotterdam, Holland
- Electra, Henie Onstad Kunstsenter, Norway
- Du + You, Gallerie Schipper - Krome, Cologne, Germany
