= Lovehoney =

British business selling erotic items

- Industry: Retail
- Founded: 2002
- Founder: Richard Longhurst and Neal Slateford
- Subsidiaries: Womanizer
- Website: https://www.lovehoney.co.uk/

Lovehoney is a British business that sells sex toys, lingerie and erotic gifts on the Internet. Their tagline is "the sexual happiness people". In addition to retailing, Lovehoney has more than 400 own brand products and does development and publicity. In 2014 the company was the focus of a television show entitled Frisky Business, which looked at their day-to-day operations.

== Background ==
Lovehoney was founded in Bath, Somerset in 2002 by Richard Longhurst (former editor of .net magazine and PC Format) and Neal Slateford (former member of DNA). The company employs 230 people in the area, and is an official UK distributor of Durex products. In 2009–10, Lovehoney had a turnover of £10.4 million and profits of £1.5 million. In 2010–11, it had a turnover of £13.4 million, and in 2011–12, it had a turnover of £16 million. In 2020–21, the turnover was £87.3 million.

== History ==
Lovehoney launched its online store in 2002, operating from Richard Longhurst's bedroom. The next year Lovehoney moved into a small warehouse, and became a limited company. Lovehoney developed its first product in 2005, a music-activated vibrator called iBuzz.

In 2007, Lovehoney launched the world's first sex toy recycling scheme, called Rabbit Amnesty. In 2009, Lovehoney announced the first Lovehoney Design A Sex Toy Competition. The winner of that competition was Trevor Murphy with the Sqweel Oral Sex Simulator. The Lovehoney Sqweel Oral Sex Simulator is the bestselling oral sex simulation sex toy in the world. Lovehoney USA was launched to sell Lovehoney own brand products wholesale to the United States.

In 2011, Lovehoney expanded its warehouse and workforce and the company is rebranded, with the cartoon mascot "Honey" being dropped and the tagline "the sexual happiness people" adopted. Lovehoney was featured in a Channel 4 documentary titled More Sex Please, We're British in 2012. Also in 2012, Lovehoney secured exclusive world rights outside the Americas to design, manufacture and sell products based on the Fifty Shades trilogy by E. L. James. In 2013, a Lovehoney advert was the first to say "sex toys" on British television.

Lovehoney released the television show Frisky Business in 2014. Lovehoney purchased a majority stake in Alan Frei's company Amorana in 2020. In 2021, Lovehoney received The Queen's Award for Enterprise. Also in 2021, Lovehoney underwent a merger with WOW Tech to become Lovehoney Group, and was later featured in Channel 4's Christmas-themed documentary titled Naughty & Nice: Sex Toy Britain.

== Notes and references ==
- "Starting out". The Telegraph. Telegraph Media Group. 28 August 2005.
- Hunt, Justin (29 April 2004). "Good vibrations". The Guardian. UK: Guardian News and Media.
