= LELO =

Swedish sex toy manufacturer

LELOi AB
- Company type: Private
- Industry: Consumer Goods
- Founded: Stockholm, Sweden (2002)
- Founder: Eric Kalen, Carl Magnuson, Filip Sedic
- Headquarters: Stockholm, Sweden
- Key people: Milivoj Librenjak (CEO)
- Products: Luxury Goods
- Number of employees: 300+
- Website: www.lelo.com

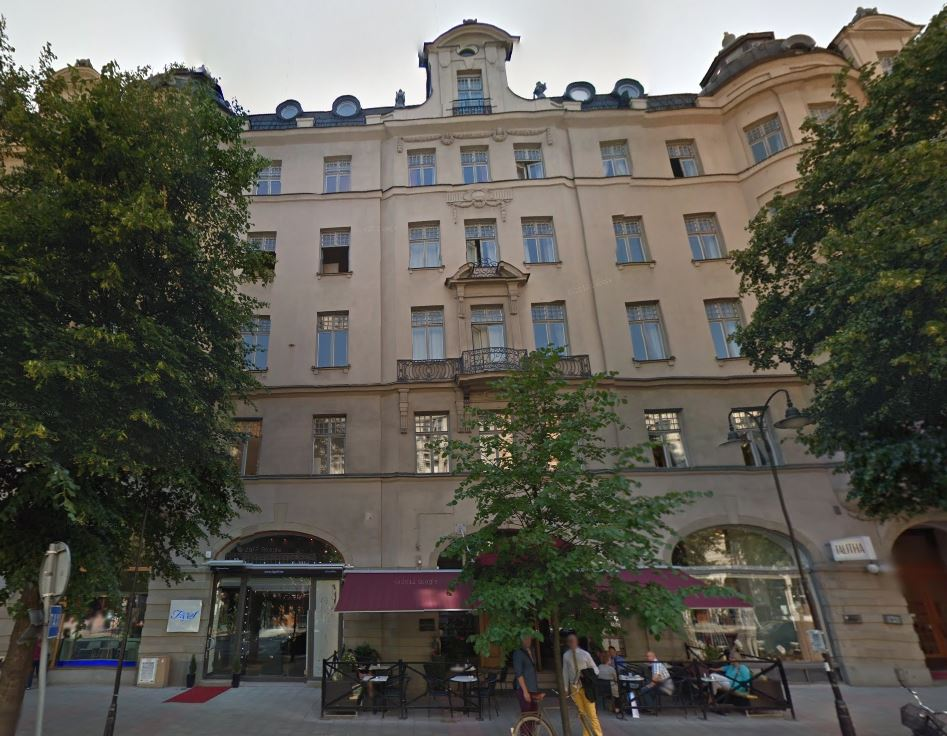
The official company registration address at an apartment in Stockholm

LELO (LELOi AB) is a Swedish company that manufactures sex toys and massage products, based in Stockholm, Sweden with other offices in Melbourne, San Jose, and Shanghai. A 2011 The New York Times article detailed that LELO sold one of the most expensive vibrators in the world, a 24-karat gold-plated vibrator that cost $15,000.

== History ==
In 2002, industrial designers Eric Kalén and Carl Magnuson, and engineer Filip Sedic founded LELO. In September 2003, the three registered LELO LLC. LELO presently has over 600 employees with offices in Asia, Australia, Europe, and the US.

== Operations ==
=== Partners and distributors ===
In 2016 LELO HEX condoms launched in Target stores and in 2017, they became available in all Target, Walmart and Rite Aid stores. On February 25, 2009, LELO partnered with Walgreens to make the LELO products available in all drugstore locations in the United States. Also, in 2019. LELO HEX condoms were available in Equinox Hotel. On May 22, 2010, the Swedish state-owned pharmacy chain Apoteket also announced that it would be carrying a limited range of LELO products. A month later, LELO announced its collaboration with the Ron Robinson boutique at the Fred Segal shopping center in Hollywood. On May 13, 2011, Brookstone announced they would begin to feature the Alia, Gigi, Lily, and Siri personal massagers, and the Flickering Touch line of massage oils and candles in select retail locations, and in their online store; LELO and Brookstone launched the partnership at The Venetian, Las Vegas, where they also showcased the LELO Sussurra collection of intimate apparel.
