= Vibratex =

American sex toy company

Vibratex, Inc.
- Type: Incorporated
- Industry: distribution
- Founded: 1984
- Headquarters: Napa, United States
- Products: Vibrators and Massagers
- Website: www.vibratex.com

Vibratex is a manufacturer of sex toys, headquartered in Napa, California. The company was founded in 1983 by Suzi and Harold Spielberg. They aimed to bring Japanese style sex toys to the American market, with a focus on bright colours and non phallic shapes. Vibratex has been covered by Glamour magazine and O, The Oprah Magazine.

Vibratex produced the Rabbit Pearl vibrator, which they claimed was the first dual-stimulation toy on the market. It found success after the rabbit vibrator was featured on Season 1, Episode 9 of HBO's hit series Sex and the City. After the episode's release, sex shops found themselves with huge demand for the toy, with Good Vibrations (sex shop) having a line of women waiting to see the vibrator. Vibratex noticed the increase in sales, but only became aware of the reason when a client sent them a VHS copy of the Sex and the City episode. The company's annual sales increased more than 700% in the years following the episode, and the company increased orders with their Japanese manufacturer to keep up with demand. The company has since ceased sales of the Rabbit Pearl.

Since 2000, Vibratex has been the only authorized U.S. import agent of the Hitachi Magic Wand massager. In 2013 the wand was redesigned and renamed to Original Magic Wand. A spokesperson from Vibratex explained the change came after Hitachi considered discontinuing the device as they worried about their brand name being associated to the sex toy. Vibratex stated they were involved in convincing Hitachi to continue producing it under the new name.
