= Erotic furniture =

Furniture designed for sexual purposes

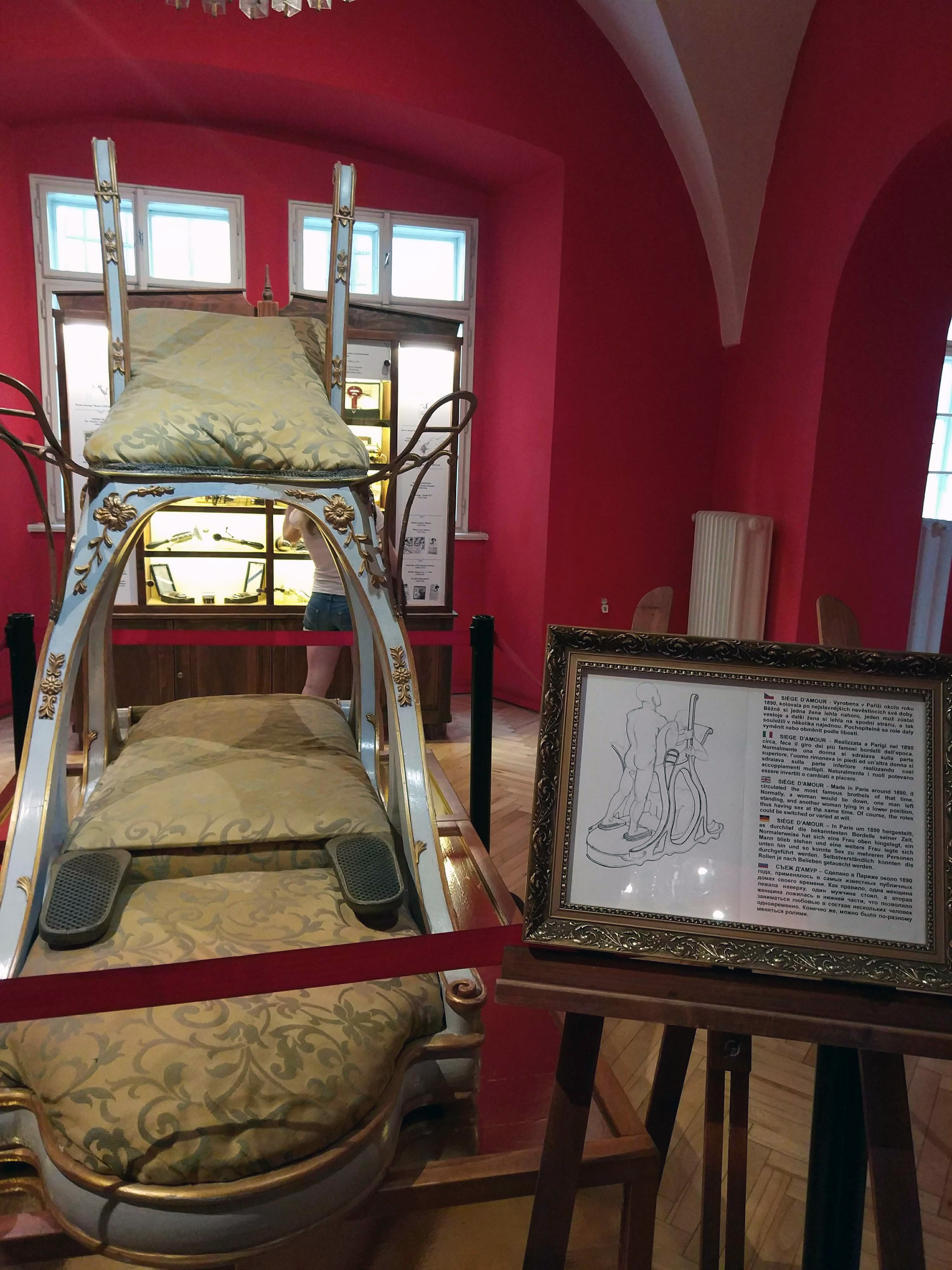
A chair designed to facilitate threesomes, exhibited in the Sex Machines Museum in Prague

Erotic furniture, also known as sex furniture, is any form of furniture that is designed to act as an aid to sexual activity. This includes furniture and harnesses designed to aid positioning, assisting with comfort, penetration level and stimulation. Other types of erotic furniture are constructed to be an aid to erotic bondage. The functionality may be obvious or the erotic furniture may be designed to appear as conventional furniture. Some conventional items of furniture such as the four-poster bed and the chaise longue traditionally have erotic associations, but they are not considered to be erotic furniture as their primary use is not erotic. Erotic furniture can also be furniture decorated with erotic art.

== History ==
In ancient Assyria, there are examples of furniture decorated with erotic reliefs dating to the 13th century BC.

According to an urban legend, the 18th-century Russian empress Catherine the Great collected erotic furniture, including tables with penises for legs and other items carved in relief with penises and vulvas.

The 1791 French novel Les Délices de Coblentz describes beds that are designed to increase sexual pleasure by virtue of the elasticity of their springs.

The British king Edward VII, who was heavily overweight, used a specially constructed "love chair" (siège d'amour) when he visited the famous brothel Le Chabanais in Paris. The piece still exists and a replica was exhibited at the Musée de l'érotisme in Pigalle.

Edward Gorey's The Curious Sofa (1961) is a neo-Victorian pseudo-porno satire described as a "pornographic illustrated story about furniture". The book consists of euphemistic illustrations with strategically deployed objects, such as potted plants and tree branches, that block the reader's view of sexual activities taking place on furniture.

The British pop artist Allen Jones has designed erotic furniture. His piece Hatstand, Table and Chair, consisting of scantily clad female mannequins converted to items of furniture, was first exhibited in 1970.

News reports during the 2024 Paris Olympics said that the bed bases provided for competing athletes were made from recycled cardboard to prevent them from having sex. However, the organisers said that the material was chosen for its environmental impact, and the manufacturer said they "can support several people on top".

In modern times, erotic furniture continues to be produced mainly by small businesses rather than large-scale manufacturers.

== Types ==
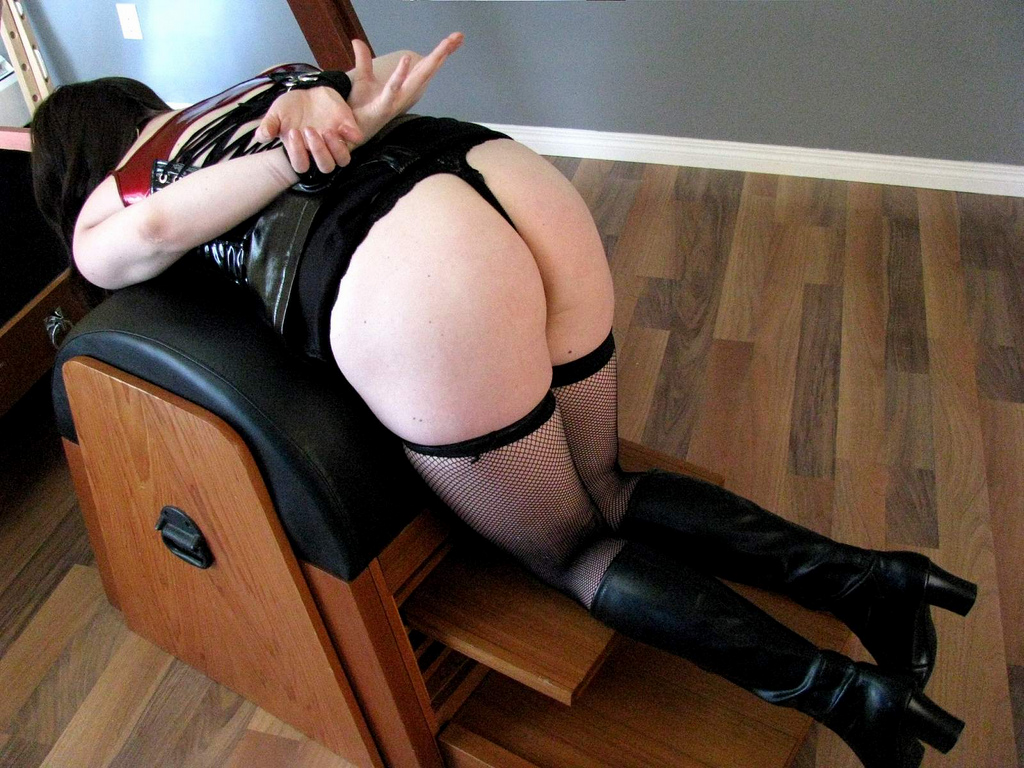
A spanking bench

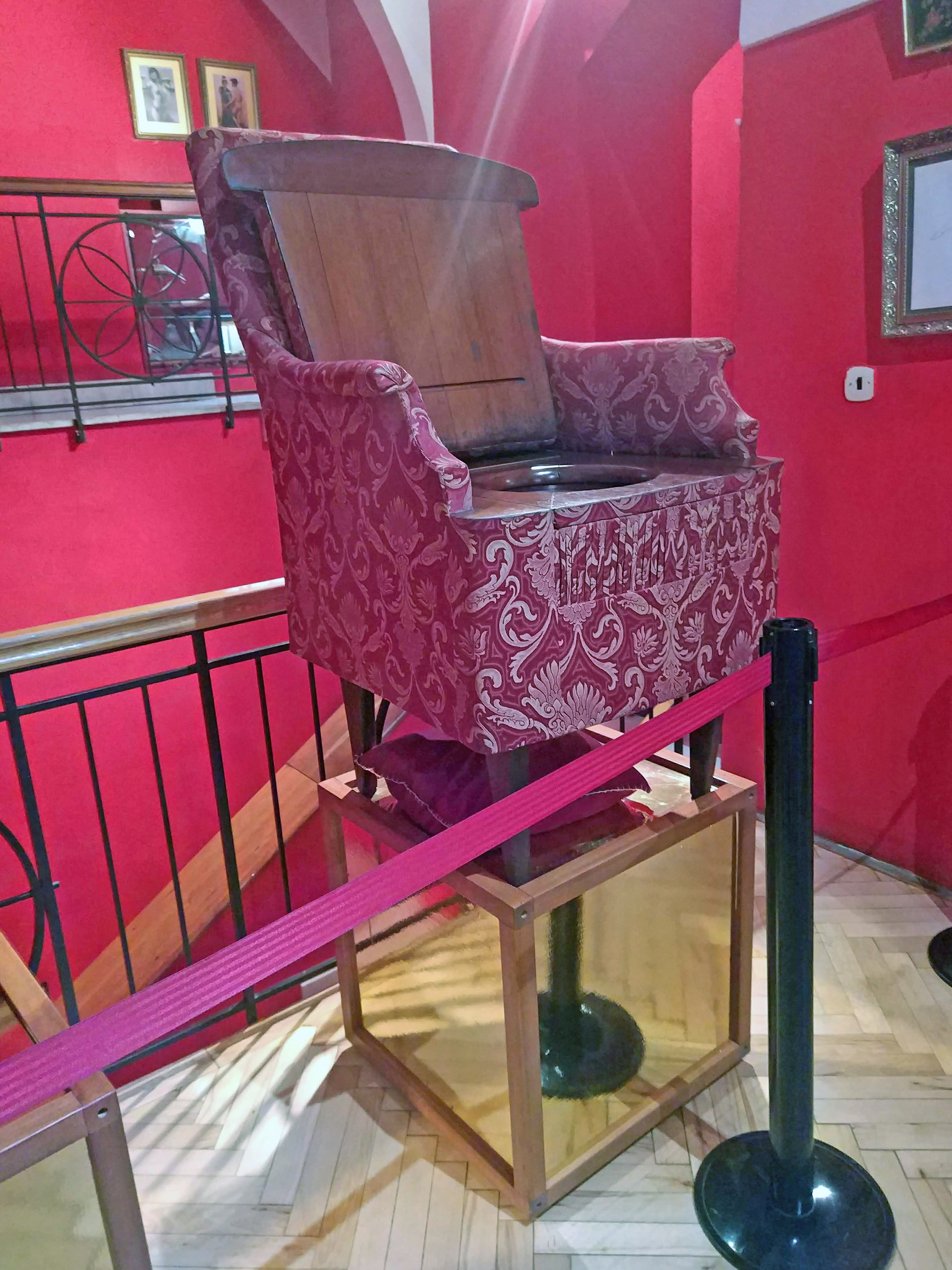
Chair with a toilet seat for use in coprophagy activities, Sex Machines Museum, Prague

Specifically designed furniture for erotic purposes can include:

- Devices to aid impact play activities such as erotic spanking and flagellation. This type of furniture includes spanking benches such as the Berkley Horse. Another example is the Saint Andrew's Cross to which a person is tied.
- Sex swings, either freestanding or temporarily installable in places such as doorways.
- Fisting slings
- Sex gliders (also known as monkey rockers) – rocking stools with built-in dildos
- Devices for using gravity to aid in sex without the use of complicated slings.
- Various types of angled foam wedges or specially designed sex pillows that support various sex positions. Liberator Shapes are an example which can be used to improve g-spot and cervical stimulation. Another example are the ergonomically based Lovebumpers.
- Bondage equipment such as stocks, pillories and cages.
- Smotherboxes and other queening stools used for facesitting.
- Sex chairs and sex sofas, positioning furniture which in some cases have openings to allow for genital or anal access.
- The Love Chair, a chair made of curved tubular steel, articulated in several ways and designed to facilitate otherwise impossible sexual acts. This device was advertised in men's magazines in the mid-1970s, and is seen in at least one of Nina Hartley's Guide to videos, but it is no longer commercially available.
- Wooden horses, which are shaped much like the sawhorses used for carpentry, but have a sharpened edge and are primarily sat on to achieve a feeling similar to a crotch rope in bondage.
- Sybians, a type of sex machine consisting of a vibrating saddle-like seat with an upward-pointing shaft for internal stimulation.

== See also ==
- Human furniture
- List of BDSM equipment
- Sex machine
- Sex toy

== Bibliography ==
- Kemper, Alfred M. (1972). Love Couches Design Criteria. Los Angeles. LCCN 75-36170. OCLC 3592145. (101 pages. Design criteria for assistive furniture, with sections on accommodation of disabled persons.)
