= Rabbit vibrator =

Sex toy

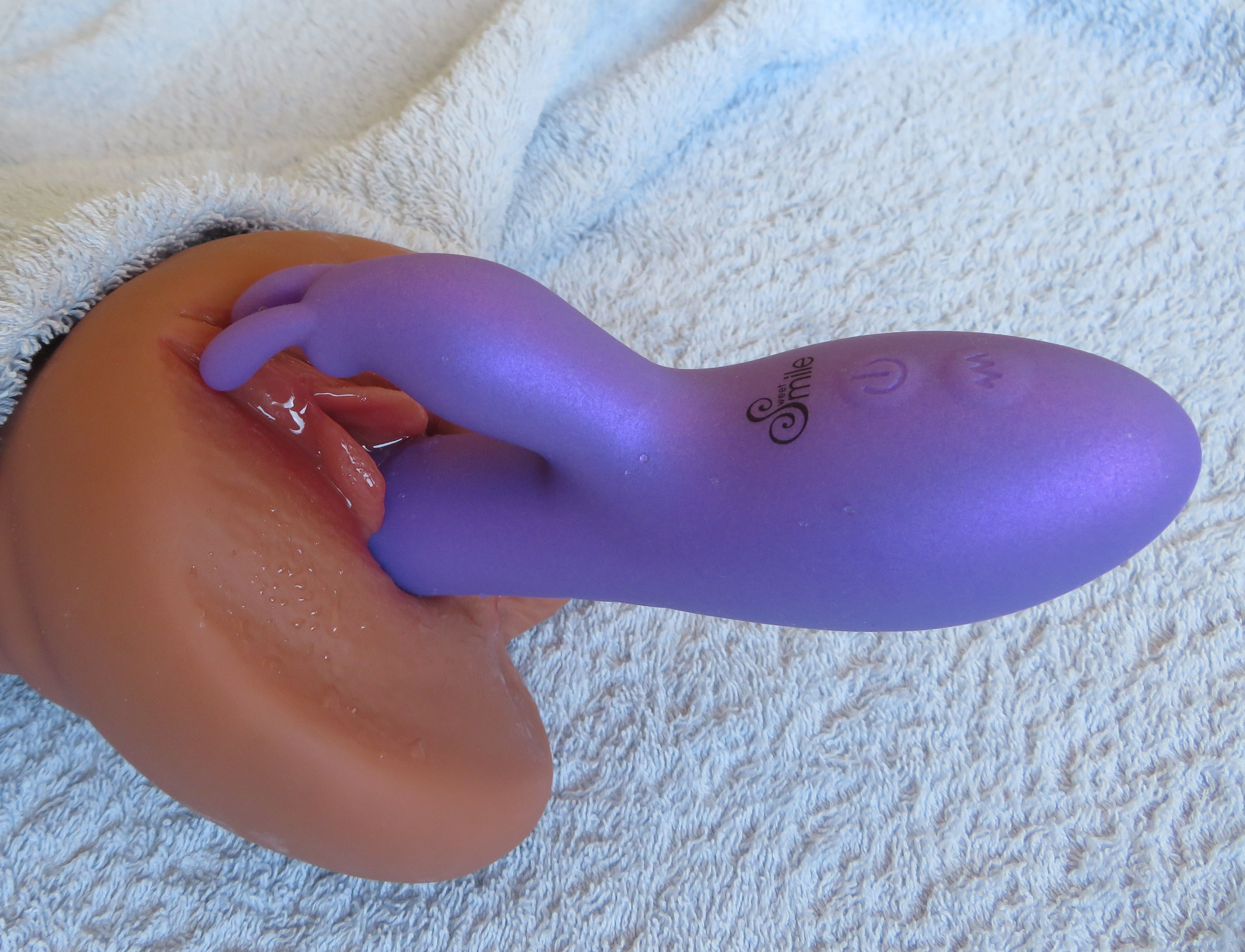
Rabbit vibrator in a vulva-model made of silicone.

A rabbit vibrator (also known as a Jack Rabbit vibrator or Jessica Rabbit vibrator) is a vibrating sex toy, usually made in the shape of a phallic shaft for vaginal stimulation with a clitoral stimulator attached to the shaft. The device's name is derived from the fact that the clitoral stimulator looks like a pair of rabbit ears. The first rabbit vibrator appeared on the market in 1984 and, along with the magic wand vibrator, is considered by Cosmopolitan magazine to be one of the classic sex toys.

Their popularity was boosted in the United States after a 1998 episode of HBO's Sex and the City ("The Turtle and the Hare") featured Vibratex's Rabbit Pearl. The rabbit was chosen for the show because it was a bestseller at a store in New York.

Rabbit vibrators are designed to give more intense sensations than the more traditional dildo or clitoral stimulator by providing simultaneous vaginal and clitoral stimulation. The Rabbit Pearl, the original device, also had a rotating section.

Since then, the rabbit vibrator has evolved and become a whole genre of sex toys with many different brands and variations in design, including ones with a less phallic shape or without the rotating beads section. The device can be used in a variety of ways and for both solo sexual play and during partnered sex.

== History ==
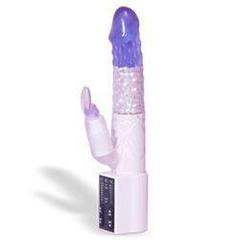
Techno Rabbit Vibrator

Company owner Shay Martin says Vibratex was the first to import dual-action vibrators to the United States in 1983. These vibrators were imported from Japan and were manufactured in bright colours and shaped to look like beavers, kangaroos, and turtles to get around the country's obscenity laws, unlike previous imports from China that had been designed to resemble a realistic phallus. Martin credits their colouring and cuteness as making them more appealing to women and leading to the market success of the Rabbit. Designers at Vibratex had been working on a new version that added rotating pearls to the base of the shaft of the dual-action vibrators.

In 1984, the Rabbit Pearl was released. From 1985 onwards, Rabbit Pearl had imitators, including Susan Colvin's Jack Rabbit for the adult magazine company CPLC and the Rampant Rabbit for the UK sex toy party company Ann Summers.

== Materials ==
Normally, rabbit vibrators are made out of a jelly-like substance (polyvinyl chloride), silicone (semi-organic polymer), rubber (elastic hydrocarbon polymer), or latex (natural rubber) materials. Silicone vibrators are not porous; therefore, the toy absorbs no bacteria or foreign matter. Silicone retains heat and has no odour. Jelly material is porous and cannot be sterilised in boiling water, and has a scent of rubber that some may find unappealing. Some producers aromatise the products. Rabbit vibrators made from vinyl, plastic, metal, and elastomer materials can be also found. They are much less porous than jelly or entirely non-porous.

== Use and pleasure ==
Rabbit vibrators are designed for simultaneous internal (vaginal) and external (clitoral) stimulation. The rabbit-shaped stimulator is held near the clitoris, while the shaft is taken into the vagina, offering deep, "all-around" stimulation. Most models offer a choice of shaft rotation speeds and patterns of clitoral stimulation. In recent years, some manufacturers, including Lovense, use wireless connectivity and app-based interfaces to enable remote and customizable operation.

Jelly can absorb the body's natural lubrication, and jelly and silicone create friction against the skin. Lack of moisture may cause irritation, discomfort, or pain.

== Commentary ==
The rabbit vibrator has been described as "one of the most visible contemporary signs of active female sexuality". The main appeal of the rabbit vibrator is its ability to give clitoral and vaginal stimulation at the same time.

== See also ==
- Anal vibrator
- G-spot vibrator
- Hitachi Magic Wand
- Vibrator (sex toy)
