= Sex toy =

Sexual pleasure device

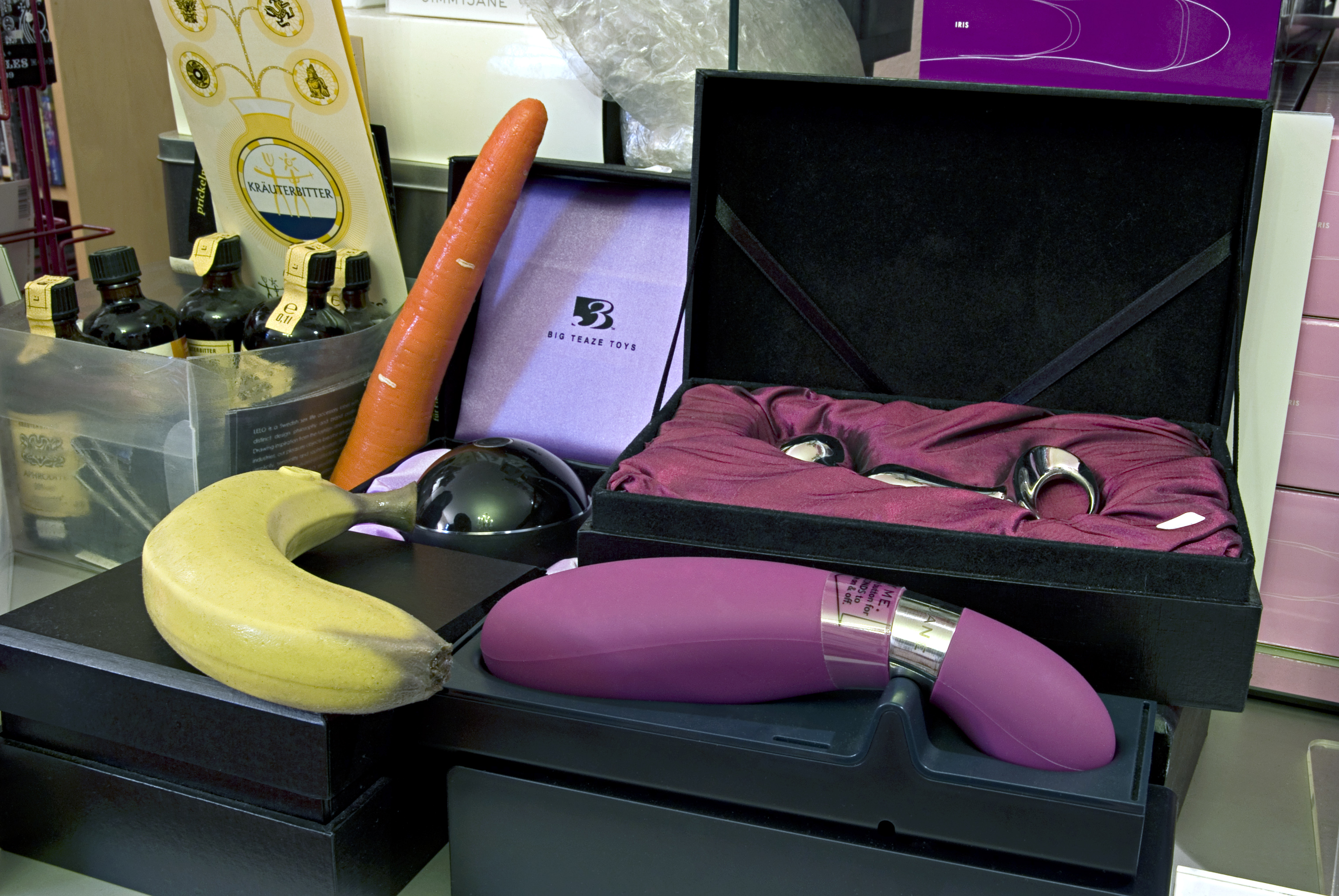
Collection of sex toys, Germany, 2005

A sex toy is an object or device that is primarily used to facilitate sexual pleasure, such as a dildo, artificial vagina or vibrator. Many popular sex toys are designed to resemble human genitals, and may be vibrating or non-vibrating. The term sex toy can also include BDSM apparatus and sex furniture such as sex swings; however, it is not applied to items such as birth control, pornography, or condoms. Alternative terms for sex toy include adult toy and the dated euphemism marital aid. Marital aid also has a broader meaning and is applied to aphrodisiac drugs and herbs marketed to enhance or prolong sex.

Sex toys are most commonly sold at sex shops or through online shopping, but they may also be sold in a pharmacy, a head shop, or a department store.

== Types ==
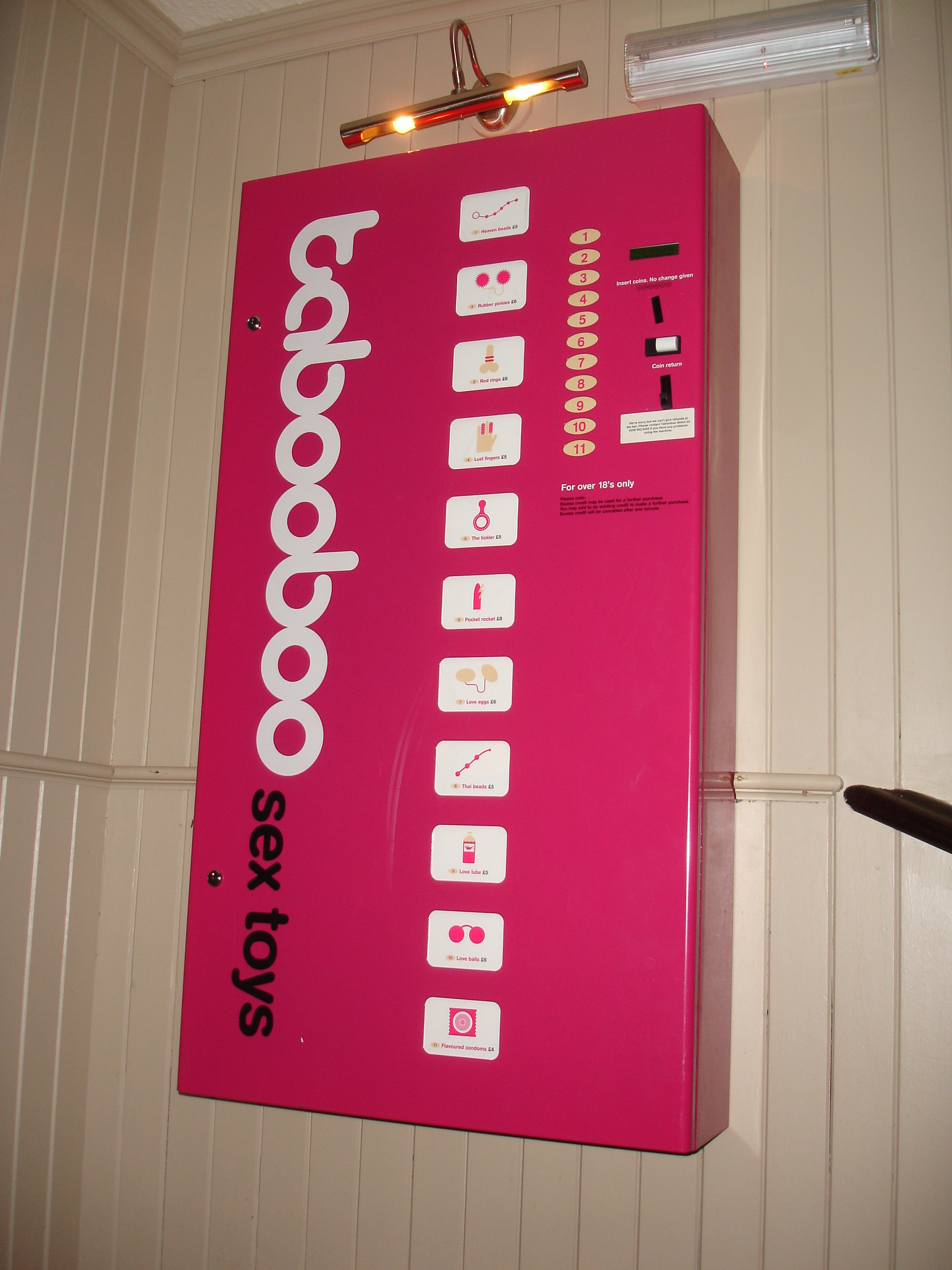
A "tabooboo" sex toys vending machine, England, 2005

=== Erotic electrostimulation ===
Another form of sex toys for both men and women are those for erotic electrostimulation. Erotic electrostimulation refers to the act of using electricity for sexual stimulation. By the mid-1970s, medical transcutaneous electrical nerve stimulation (TENS) machines were widely available. The machines work by stimulating nerve endings with electricity, sending signals of stimulation to the brain. Electrostimulation works off this same principle, when the brain received a signal of stimulation from the genitals, pleasure hormones are released.

=== Erotic furniture ===
Erotic furniture is furniture specially shaped for comfort, penetration levels, and stimulation. Also known as sex furniture, it is a form of furniture that can act as an aid to sexual activity. While almost anything can be used for this purpose, with the most common form of furniture employed for sexual activity being the bed, couches and sofas, these are not strictly erotic furniture, as their primary use is not erotic.

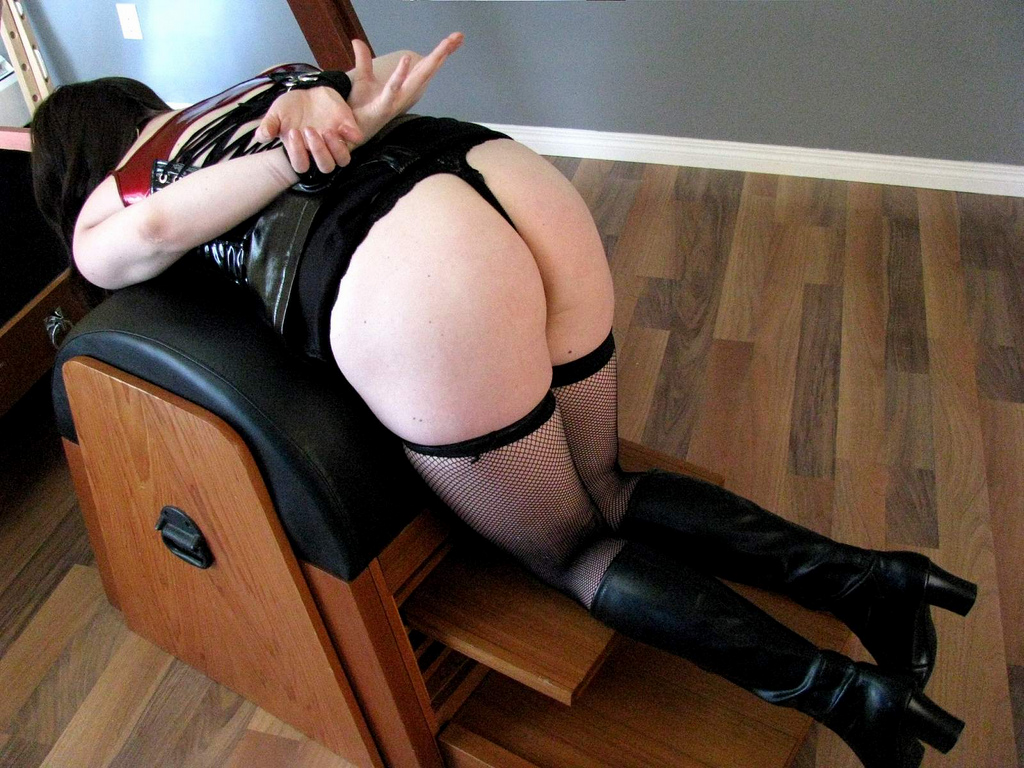
A spanking bench

Specifically designed furniture for erotic purposes can include:

- Devices for spanking and flagellation such as the Berkley Horse
- Devices for using gravity to aid in sex without the use of complicated slings
- Fisting slings - used for positioning the person receiving when fisting
- Sex gliders - can aid in positioning or have an attached dildo for individual pleasure
- Sex swings
- Various types of angled foam wedges or specially designed pillows that support various sex positions, e.g., Liberator Shapes or the ergonomically based Lovebumpers

Erotic furniture can also act as an aid for those with physical disabilities, whether intentionally or unintentionally, putting less strain on the body or even making some positions attainable. A few examples of erotic furniture that frequently do this are angled foam wedges and pillows, some sex swings, and sex gliders specifically designed for people with spinal injury and paralysis from the midsection and down.

=== General penetrative toys ===
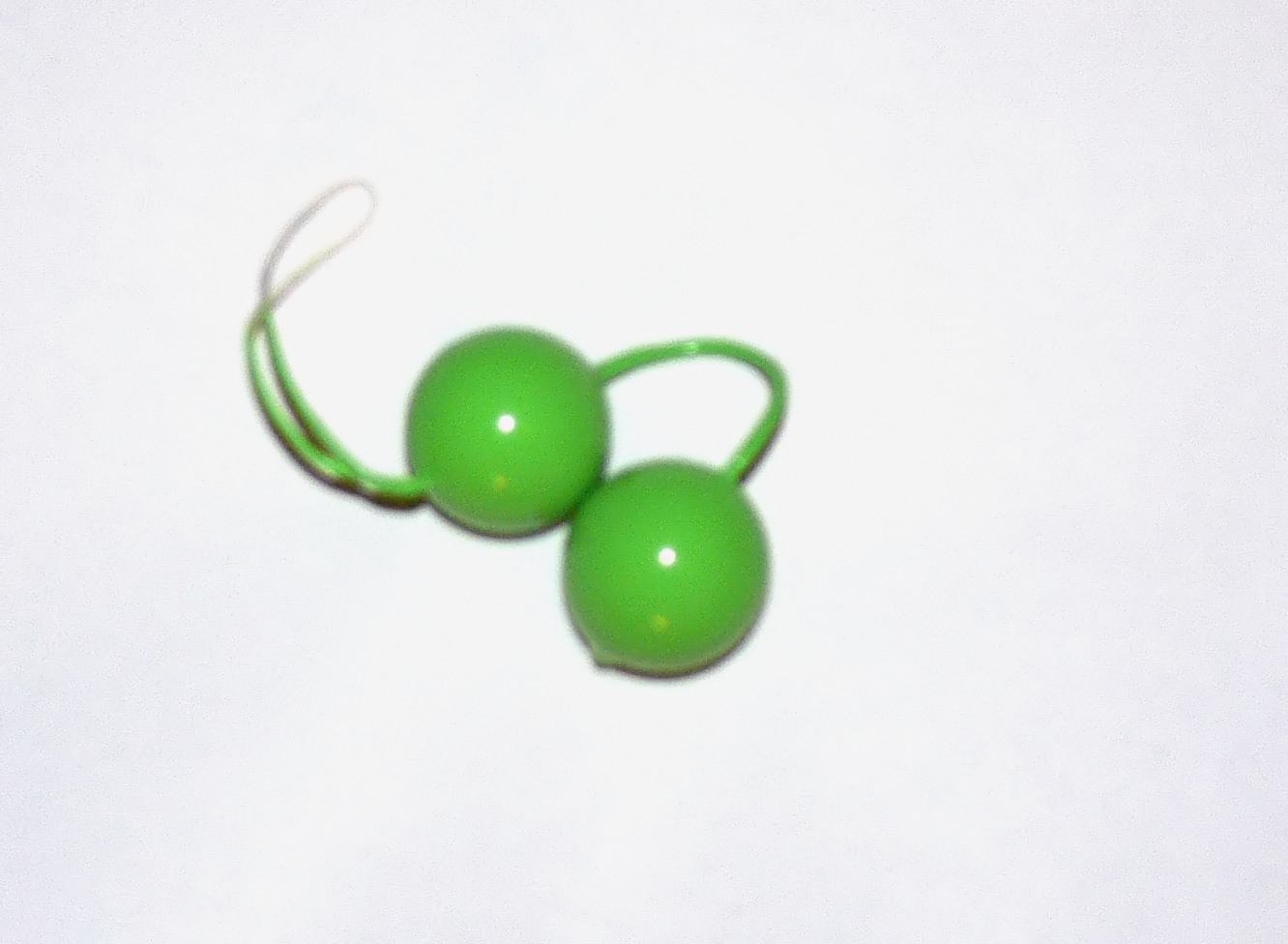
A type of Ben Wa balls

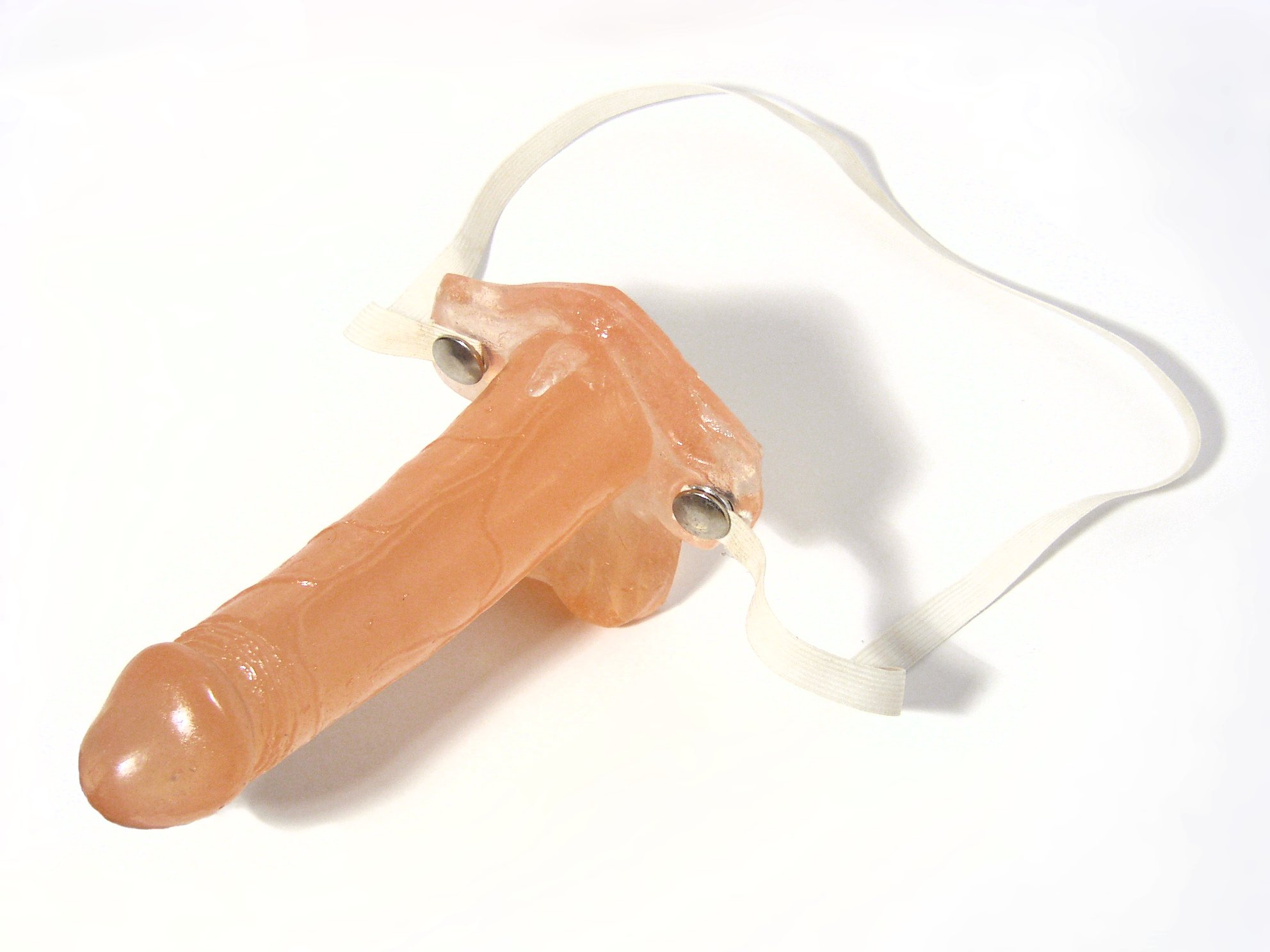
Top: A strap-on dildo
Bottom: Illustration of anal bead use
- Ben Wa balls are hollow metal balls inserted vaginally which can be worn inside the vagina for extended periods of time. The internal rolling is claimed to enhance orgasms.
- A dildo is a non-vibrating device which is used for sexual stimulation of the vagina or anus. Dildos are generally made of silicone rubber, but can be made of other materials such as body safe metals such as titanium, stainless steel, aluminum, or glass. They are often made to resemble a penis, although some are C-shaped or S-shaped for G-spot or P-spot stimulation.
  - A double penetration dildo is a long, usually flexible dildo with both ends designed for penetration. It allows for mutual penetration between two persons (or for double penetration of a single female, both anally and vaginally).
  - A strap-on dildo is a dildo worn in a harness, used to penetrate another person.
- A horseshoe is a non-vibrating sex toy, shaped similar to a horseshoe, which is put into the vagina and anus at the same time. It is made with softer plastics.
- Kegel exerciser, also known as vaginal barbells, eggs, or jugglers, are designed to improve muscle tone in the pelvic floor, and can be used for sexual pleasure as well as enhancing vaginal response.
- A sex machine is a motor-driven device that combines penetration with rotational or reciprocal movement, or both.

==== Anal toys ====
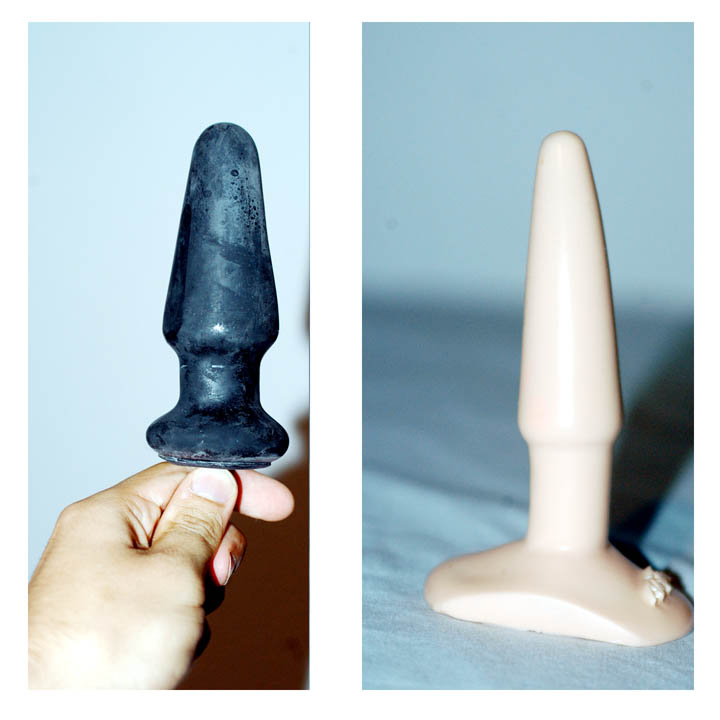
Two butt plugs

- Anal beads
- Butt plugs are often shorter dildos intended for anal insertion. They tend to have a flared base to prevent the device from becoming sucked into the rectum.
- Prostate massagers are devices designed to stimulate a prostate for health and pleasure.

==== Glass sex toys ====
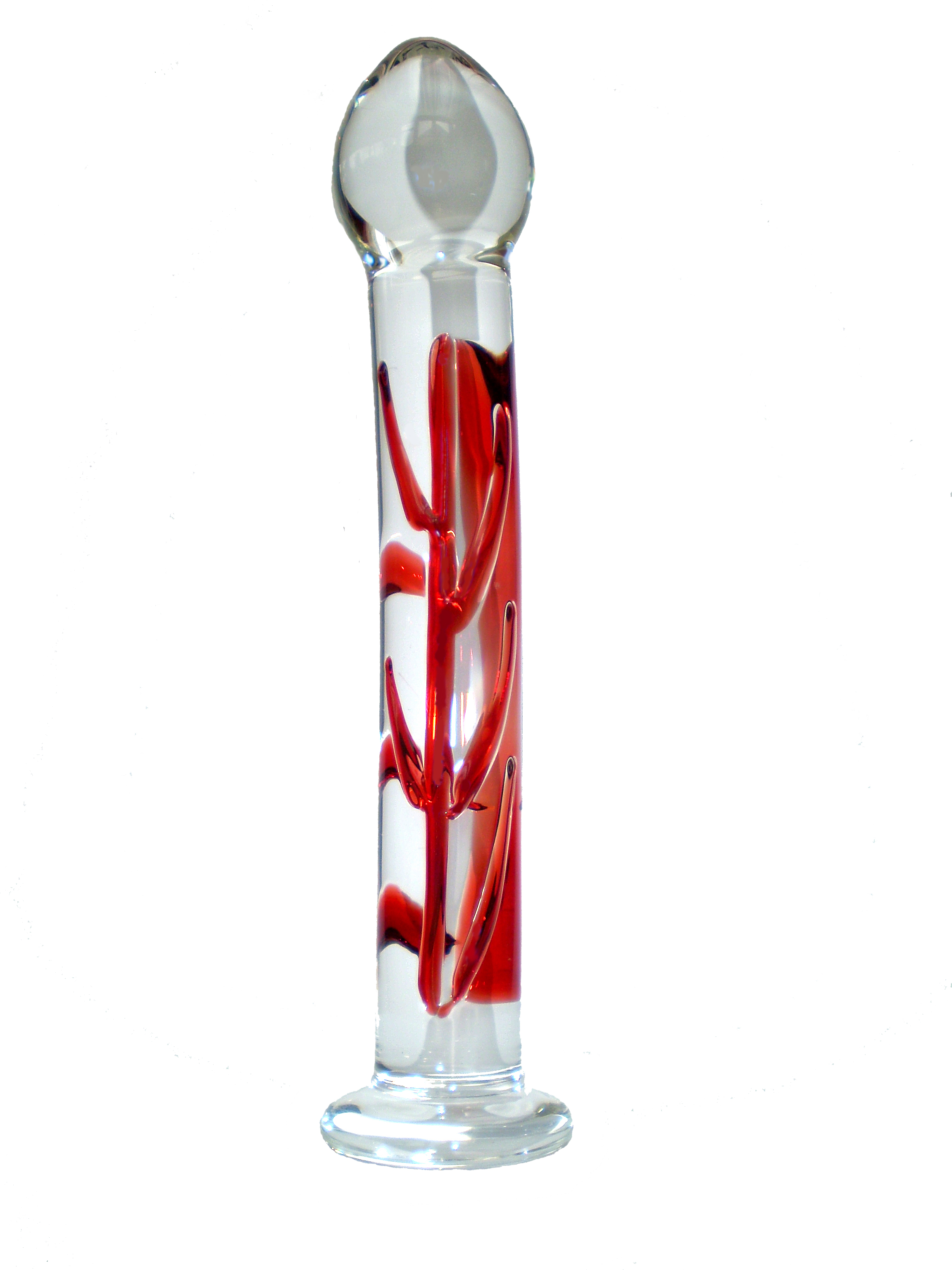
Glass dildo

Glass sex toys are commonly made from clear medical grade borosilicate glass ("hard glass"). This particular type of safety toughened glass is non-toxic and will withstand extreme temperatures as well as physical shock without compromising its structural integrity.

The choice of this high-grade material provides safety in use and the option to heat or chill the toys. Borosilicate glass is also non-porous and can be sterilized to help prevent infection with reuse. The highest quality glass toys can even be put in the dishwasher making them easier to keep clean. As well as their practical qualities, a main selling point of glass sex toys is their visual appeal.

Some glass sex toys vibrate. There are two main ways this can be achieved. Either the toy may have a hole into which a small bullet vibrator can be inserted, or the core of the glass design can be modified to form a standard vibrator. The latter option usually has a plastic cap covering the battery compartment, which will also house any control buttons or switches.

==== Vibrators ====
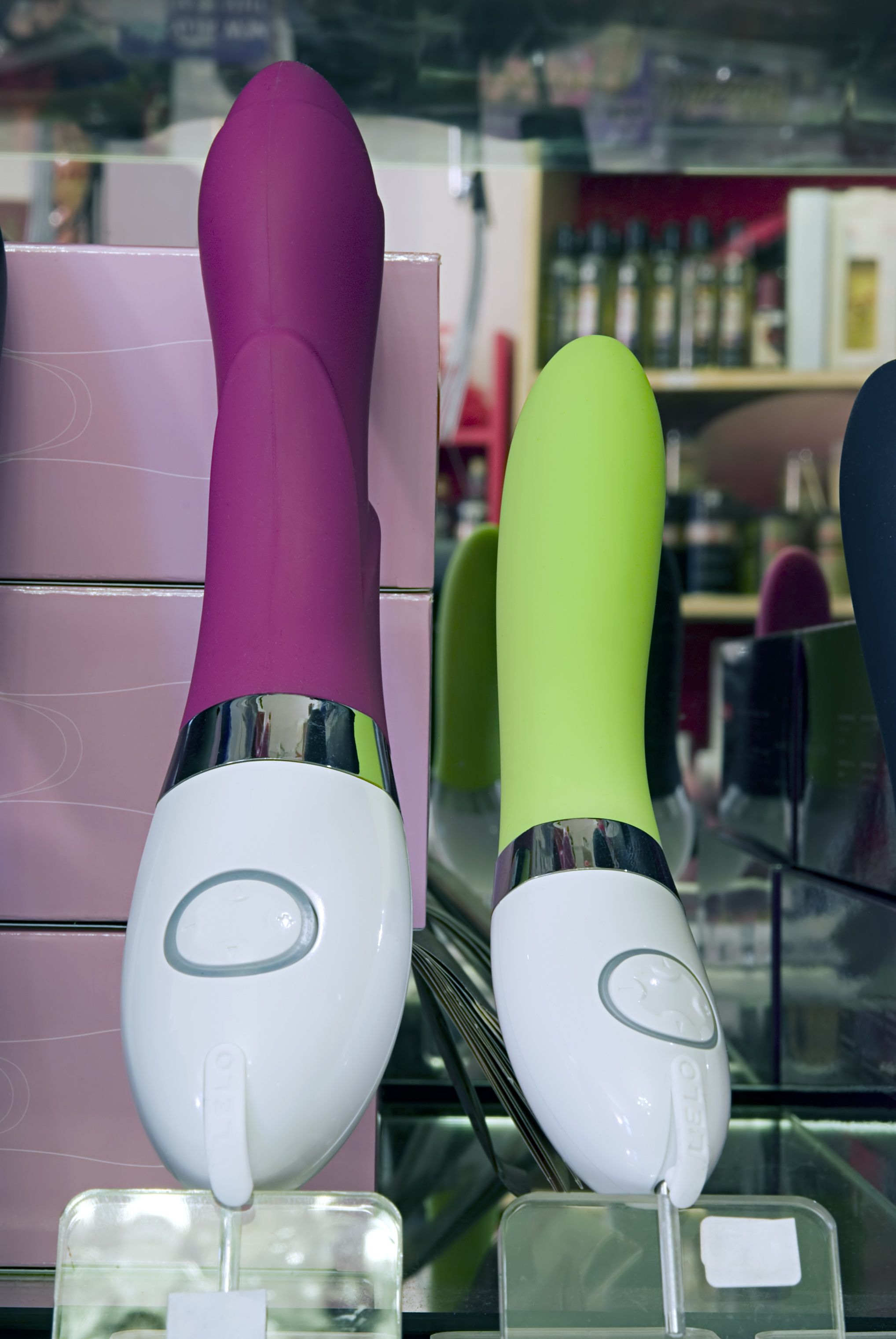
Two vibrators in a sex shop

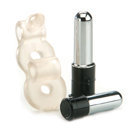
Vibrator for couples: love ring

Vibrators are electric motor-powered devices intended to stimulate the body by creating a pulsating or buzzing sensation. Vibrators come in a range of shapes and sizes, for internal or external use. Some vibrators intended for internal use are phallic in shape. Small vibrators may have a stretchy loop attachment for use as a finger toy or cock ring. Penetrative vibrators usually measure twelve to eighteen cm (five to seven inches) in length and two to five cm (one to two inches) wide often to mimic the size of the average human penis.

- Anal vibrators are designed to be inserted into the rectum, which may stimulate the prostate in men. The safest ones have a flared base which remains outside the body, that prevents the toy from becoming irretrievable.
- Bullet vibrators are small, bullet-shaped vibrators that can be used for direct stimulation or inserted into other sex toys to increase stimulation. Some are sold with stretchy loops for attachment as a finger toy or cock ring.
- G-spot vibrators are curved at one end to facilitate stimulation of the female G-spot.
- P-spot vibrators are curved at one end to facilitate stimulation of the male P-spot.
- Luxury vibrators have an increased focus on design and the use of expensive materials that appeal to a more upscale fashion market.
- The rabbit vibrator, of which there are several variations, is a popular female sex toy popularized by the television series Sex and the City. It comprises an insertable shaft which often has additional functionality, such as rotation and internal beads or a thrusting action. Attached to the shaft is a vibrating clitoral stimulator. For most rabbit vibrators this comes in the form of "bunny ears" which sit each side of the clitoris.
- Sybians are dual-area vibrators in the form of a clitoral stimulator and vaginal stimulator, designed to stimulate the two erogenous zones simultaneously and independently.

=== Nipple toys ===
- Nipple clamps are clamps used to stimulate the nipples by applying varying degrees of pressure.
- Suction devices are generally either rubber or glass.

=== Penile toys ===
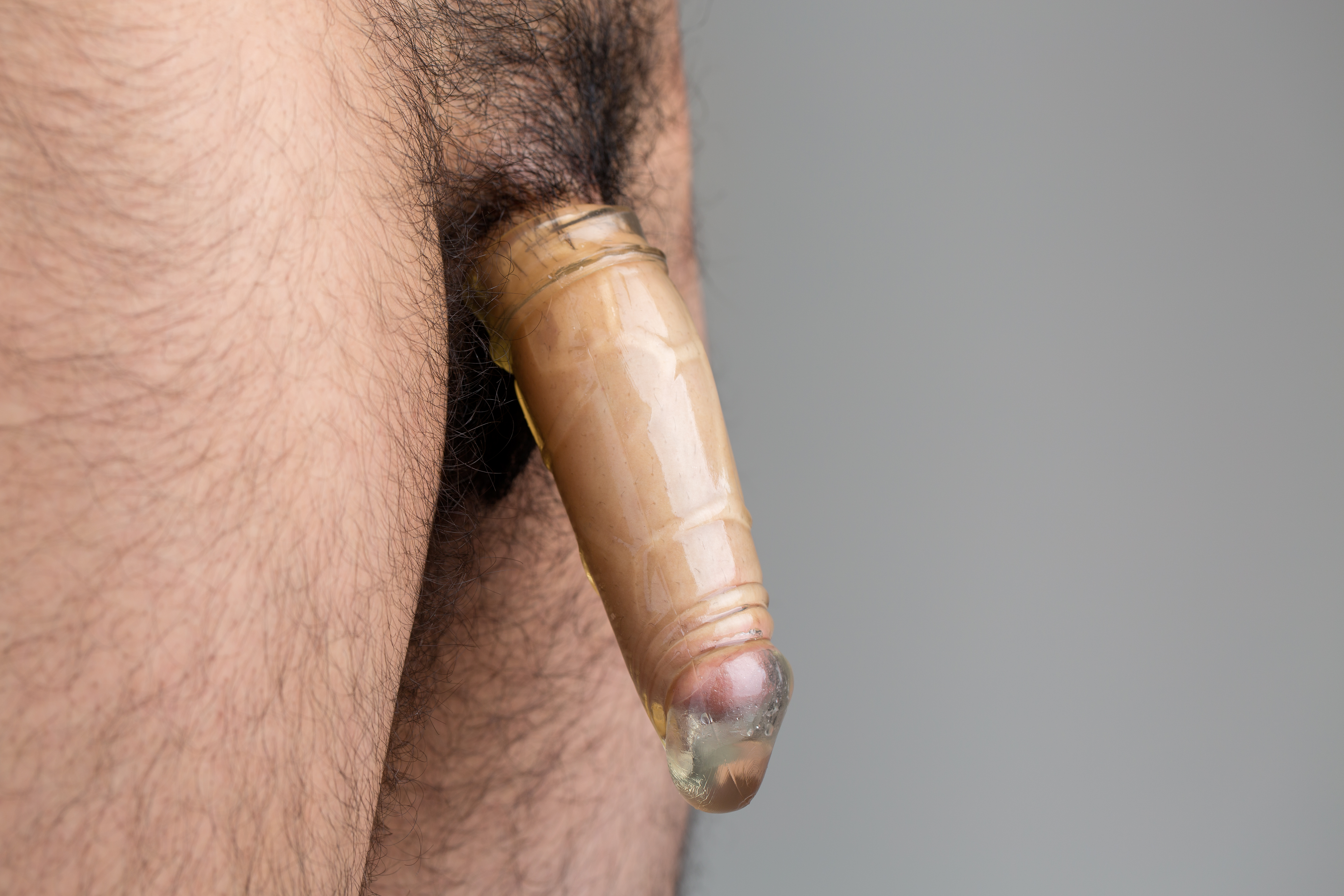
A penis sleeve

- Artificial vaginas, also known as "pocket pussies", "male masturbators", or "strokers", are tubes made of soft material to simulate sexual intercourse. The material and often textured inner canal are designed to stimulate the penis and induce orgasm. The male masturbators come in many shapes and styles; they can be shaped like vulvas, anuses, mouths, or as non-descriptive holes. Some male masturbators are disposable and some can be washed and used repeatedly. Some are equipped with sex machine options that work similar to milking machines.
- A cock harness is a more elaborate harness designed to be worn around the penis and scrotum. Its function is similar to that of a cock ring. These devices are often associated with BDSM activities such as cock and ball torture. An Arab strap is one such form of harness, purported to be a device used for maintaining an erection.
- Cock rings prolong male erection by holding blood inside the penis. A man may wear a cock ring to combat erectile difficulties, or for the sensation of tightness and engorgement that wearing one provides. Some models include a protruding clitoral stimulator, designed to stimulate the clitoris during sex. Others vibrate, either vibrating the ring itself, or in a popular 'Dolphin' variant by using two removable bullet vibrators to provide stimulation to both the testicles and clitoris. Some cock rings also have vibrators attached which can be worn to stimulate a partner during sexual intercourse, especially in the scrotum or perineum. Yet other cock rings have arms that rub and apply pressure to the perineum of the wearer.
  - A triple crown is a special cock ring that has additional rings for restraining the testicles. In orgasm, the testicles usually retract toward the body before ejaculation. A triple crown changes and intensifies the sensation of orgasm by forcing the testicles to stay away from the body.
- A docking sleeve is a cylindrical device similar to a penis sleeve, but is open at both ends, so that two men can dock.
- An FTM stroker is a pocket-pussy-style toy designed "for [the] t-cock/enlarged clitoris" of a transgender man on hormone replacement therapy. In 2016, Buck Angel released the first such device, the Buck-Off.
- A penis extension is a partially hollow device like a very short dildo, with the hollow end placed on the end of the penis, intended to increase the effective length of the penis, again for the benefit of the person being penetrated. These are generally worn with condoms to prevent them from falling off during use.
- A penis sleeve is a cylindrical device that is placed on the shaft of the penis, with the aim of increasing stimulation for the person being penetrated. They often have soft bumps intended to provide further stimulation.
- Urethral sounds are rods, known after the nautical "sounding rods" that measure water depth, — usually silicone or metal, often with a ball at one end — inserted into the urethra for sexual stimulation. There are sounding rods for women, but they are used far less.

=== Vulvar toys ===
- Vibrator wands, such as the Hitachi Magic Wand, are large vibrators that generally plug into an electrical outlet (versus operating on battery power) and are often marketed as back massagers. They are able to produce far more powerful vibration than most battery-powered vibrators. Various attachments made of silicone or a rubber material allow the toy to be used penetratively, or give the toy more interesting texture.
- Clitoral vibrators are designed to stimulate the clitoris by direct contact.
- The Womanizer is a clitoral stimulator that uses air vibrations and suction.
- Clitoral clamps are used to stimulate the clitoris by applying pressure and restricting blood flow.
- Pussy pumps and clitoral pumps are used to sensitize the genital area prior to masturbation or sex with a partner.
- Clitoral suction toys consist mainly of a small tunnel that when placed around the clitoris and powered on, creates a feeling of suction.

== History ==
=== Dildos ===
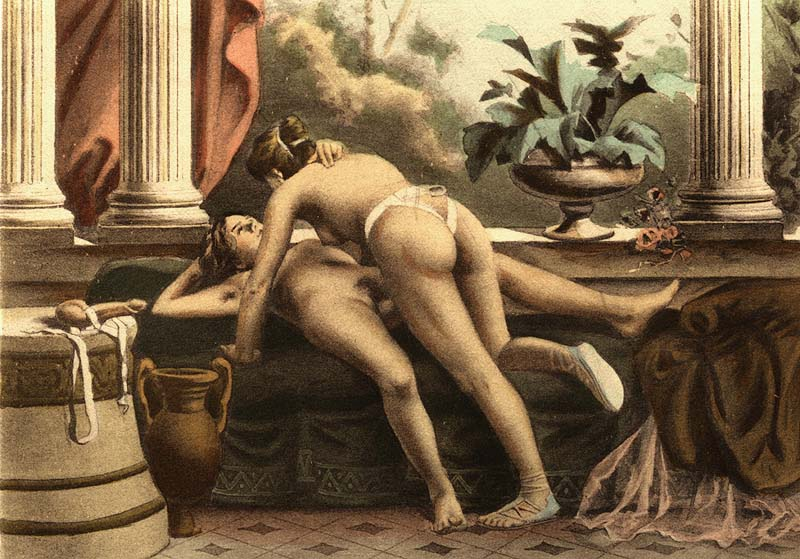
A strap-on dildo being used by two women. Lithograph from De Figuris Veneris (1906) by Édouard-Henri Avril

Dildos in one form or another have existed widely in history. Artifacts from the Upper Paleolithic of a type called bâton de commandement have been speculated to have been used for sexual purposes. Few archaeologists consider these items as sex toys, but archaeologist Timothy Taylor put it, "Looking at the size, shape, and—some cases—explicit symbolism of the ice age batons, it seems disingenuous to avoid the most obvious and straightforward interpretation. But it has been avoided."

The first dildos were made of stone, tar, wood, bone, ivory, limestone, teeth, and other materials that could be shaped as penises and that were firm enough to be used as penetrative sex toys. Scientists believe that a 20-centimeter siltstone phallus from the Upper Palaeolithic period 30,000 years ago, found in Hohle Fels Cave near Ulm, Germany, may have been used as a dildo. Prehistoric double-headed dildos have been found which date anywhere from 13 to 19,000 years ago. Various paintings from ancient Egypt around 3000 BCE feature dildos being used in a variety of ways. In medieval times, a plant called the "cantonese groin" was soaked in hot water to enlarge and harden for women to use as dildos. Dildo-like breadsticks, known as olisbokollikes (sing. olisbokollix), were known in Ancient Greece prior to the 5th century BC. In Italy during the 1400s, dildos were made of leather, wood, or stone. Chinese women in the 15th century used dildos made of lacquered wood with textured surfaces, and were sometimes buried with them. Nashe's early-1590s work The Choise of Valentines mentions a dildo made from glass. Dildos also appeared in 17th and 18th century Japan, in shunga. In these erotic novels, women are shown enthusiastically buying dildos, some made out of water buffalo horns.

Dildos were not just used for sexual pleasure. Examples from the Eurasia Ice Age (40,000-10,000 BCE) and Roman era are speculated to have been used for defloration rituals.

Many references to dildos exist in the historical and ethnographic literature. Haberlandt, for example, illustrates single and double-ended wooden dildos from late 19th century Zanzibar. With the invention of modern materials, making dildos of different shapes, sizes, colors and textures became more practical.

==== Ancient Greece ====
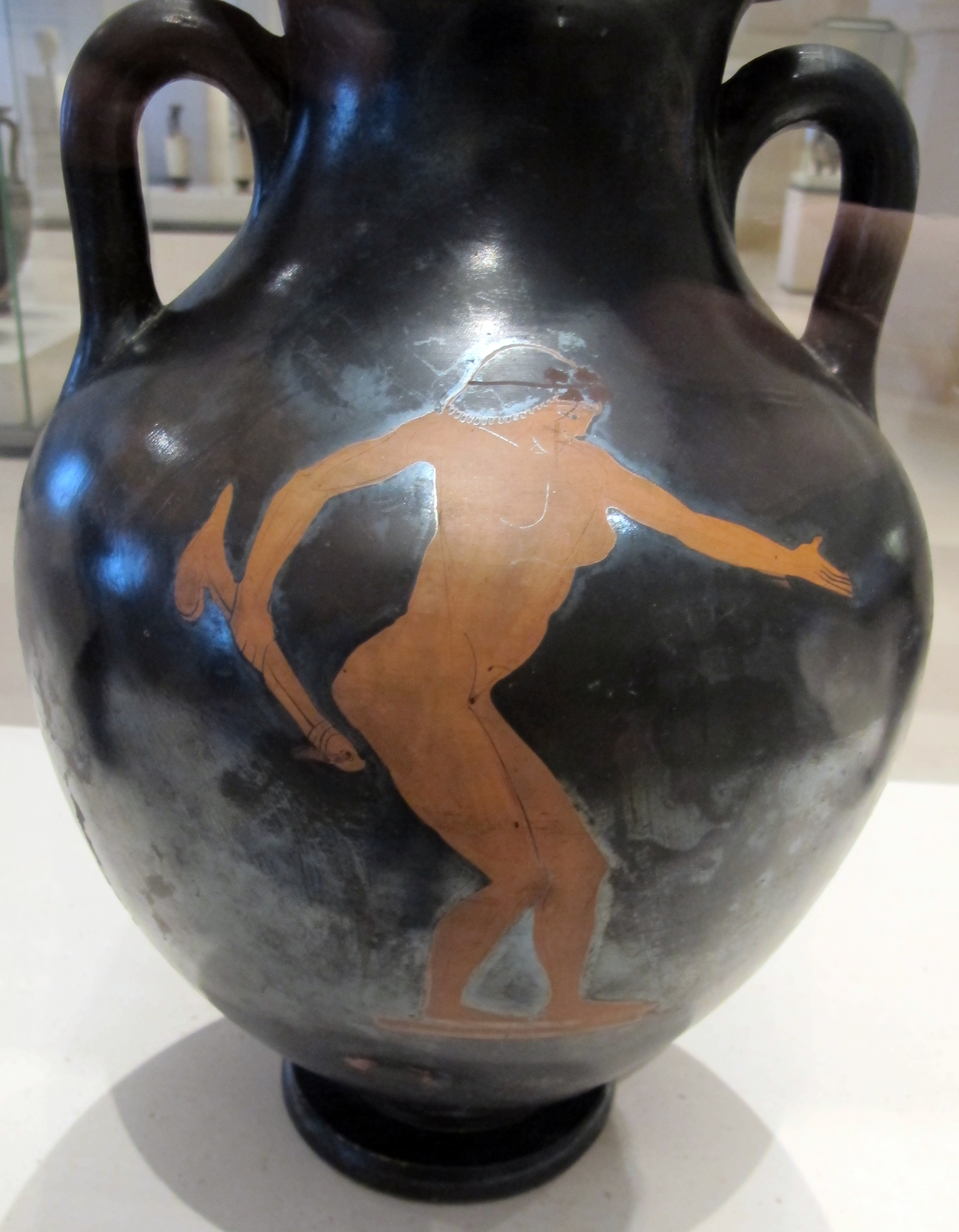
A woman with a dildo. Red figure amphora attributed to the Flying-Angel Painter c. 490 BC; City of Paris Museum of Fine Arts

Greek dildos were often made out of leather stuffed with wool in order to give it varying degrees of thickness and firmness. They were often lubricated with olive oil, and used for sexual practice and other activities. The Greeks were also one of the first groups to use the term "toy" in reference to a dildo. Dildos may be seen in some examples of ancient Greek vase art. Some pieces show their use in group sex or in solitary female masturbation. One vessel, of about the sixth century BCE, depicts a scene in which a woman bends over to perform oral sex on a man, while another man is about to thrust a dildo into her anus.

Page DuBois, a classicist and feminist theorist, suggests that dildos were present in Greek art because the ancient Greek male imagination found it difficult to conceive of sex taking place without penetration. Therefore, female masturbation or sex between women required an artificial phallus to be used.

=== Vibrators ===
Electromechanical vibrators were first invented by Joseph Mortimer Granville in the late 1880s. Its intended use was to treat muscle pains in men, not a sexual device.

Several theories have been proposed to explain how the technology grew to also have sexual uses. Rachel Maines' claims in The Technology of Orgasm about physicians using vibrators to cure hysteria through inducing an orgasm (referred to at the time as a 'paroxysm') have been widely cited in academic documents and the media as the origins of vibrators' sexual origins. However, these claims lack valid evidence.

Hallie Lieberman's more plausible historical account is that American vibrator companies started targeting household appliance and electrotherapeutic device markets in the early 1900s. It was advertised overtly as a tool to relax, assist with labor in the home, and a general medical cure-all, but coded language and imagery hinted at its potential sexual uses as well.

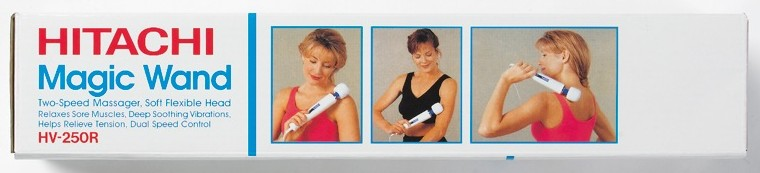
Old packaging box for the Hitachi Magic Wand, later rebranded as the Magic Wand Original.

In the late 1960s, sex-positive second-wave feminist Betty Dodson organized group masturbation workshops in New York City, encouraging women to become more independent sexually. In these sessions, Dodson encouraged the use of the Hitachi Magic Wand, a wand vibrator intended for muscle pain relief. Inspired by her workshops, Dell Williams launched “Eve’s Garden” in the same city, which marked history as the first feminist sex toy shop in the US.

This movement culturally rebranded the product as a sex toy, although Hitachi would not market it for its sexual uses. Although Hitachi briefly ceased manufacturing of the product in 2013 due to concerns of being associated to a popular sex toy, they later decided to continue manufacturing it under as the "Original Magic Wand" under the sex toy distribution company Vibratex.

== In literature ==
Dildos are mentioned several times in Aristophanes' comedy of 411 BCE, Lysistrata.

LYSISTRATA
And so, girls, when fucking time comes […] not the faintest whiff of it anywhere, right? From the time those Milesians betrayed us, we can't even find our eight-fingered leather dildos. At least they'd serve as a sort of flesh-replacement for our poor cunts […] So, then! Would you like me to find some mechanism by which we could end this war?

Herodas' short comic play, Mime VI, written in the 3rd century BCE, is about a woman called Metro, anxious to discover from a friend where she recently acquired a dildo.

METRO
I beg you, don't lie,
dear Corrioto: who was the man who stitched for you this bright red dildo?

She eventually discovers the maker to be a man called Kerdon, who hides his trade by the front of being a cobbler, and leaves to seek him out. Metro and Kerdon are main characters in the next play in the sequence, Mime VII, when she visits his shop.

=== Talmud ===
The Talmud's Avodah Zarah Tractate records the interpretation which Rav Yosef bar Hiyya gave to the Biblical reference of King Asa of Judah having "deposed his grandmother Maakah from her position as Queen Mother, because she had made a repulsive image for the worship of Asherah. Asa cut it down and burned it in the Kidron Valley" ( Kings 15:13, 2 Chronicles 15:16). According to Rav Yosef, Maakah had installed "the likeness of a male organ" on her Asherah image "and she would engage in sexual activity with it daily".

=== Early modern period ===
In the early 1590s, the English playwright Thomas Nashe wrote a poem known as The Choise of Valentines, Nashe's Dildo or The Merrie Ballad of Nashe his Dildo. This was not printed at the time, due to its obscenity but it was still widely circulated and made Nashe's name notorious. The poem describes a visit to a brothel by a man called "Tomalin"; he is searching for his sweetheart, Francis, who has become a prostitute. The only way he can see her is to hire her. However, she resorts to using a glass dildo as he finds himself unable to perform sexually to her satisfaction.

Dildos are humorously mentioned in Act IV, scene iv of Shakespeare's The Winter's Tale. This play and Ben Jonson's play The Alchemist (1610) are typically cited as the first use of the word in publication (Nashe's Merrie Ballad was not published until 1899).

In 1673, the parliament of the United-Kingdom refused the marriage between the presumed heir of the throne, James of York, and the Catholic Maria d'Este of Modena. The same year, John Wilmot, the seventeenth-century English libertine, published the poem Signor Dildo parodying the situation, stating the coming of Maria d'Este would provoke a great import of dildoes; the poem among other things states:

You ladies all of merry England
Who have been to kiss the Duchess's hand,
Pray, did you not lately observe in the show
A noble Italian called Signor Dildo?

This ballad was subsequently added to by other authors, and became so popular that Signor became a term for a dildo. In the epilogue to The Mistaken Husband (1674), by John Dryden, an actress complains:

To act with young boys is loving without men.
What will not poor forsaken women try?
When man's not near, the Signior must supply.

Many other works of bawdy and satirical English literature of the period deal with the subject. Dildoides: A Burlesque Poem (London, 1706), attributed to Samuel Butler, is a mock lament to a collection of dildos that had been seized and publicly burnt by the authorities. Examples of anonymous works include The Bauble, a tale (London, 1721) and Monsieur Thing's Origin: or Seignor D---o's Adventures in London (London, 1722). In 1746, Henry Fielding wrote The Female Husband: or the surprising history of Mrs Mary, alias Mr. George Hamilton, in which a woman posing as a man uses a dildo. This was a fictionalized account of the story of Mary Hamilton.

Dildos are obliquely referred to in Saul Bellow's novel The Adventures of Augie March (1953): "he had brought me along to a bachelor's stag where two naked acrobatic girls did stunts with false tools". A dildo called Steely Dan III from Yokohama appears in the William S. Burroughs novel The Naked Lunch (1959). The rock band Steely Dan took their name from it.

== Health, safety, and privacy concerns ==
Standards set for sex toys are set in ISO 3533:2021. The sex toys are sold as novelty items so they do not need to adhere to certain regulations such as reporting the chemicals and materials used in a product. Due to this status, manufacturers are not responsible if their toys are used for any other purpose than being a novelty. Regulations such as REACH do exist, and some sex toys may be compliant to this though, despite that there is no obligation for manufacturers on attaining compliance. A 2006 study conducted by the Greenpeace Netherlands office found high level of phthalates in seven out of eight plastic sex toys tested. Phthalates are chemical plasticizers that are added as softeners, to create the malleable and soft effect that many look for in sex toys.

Sex toys are classified as novelties in the United States because the Food and Drug Administration has extensive testing and financial requirements in order for sex toys to be classified as medical devices. Therefore, sex toy manufacturers more often choose less complex production by labeling them a novelty, where their listed ingredients do not have to be accurate in chemical composition or percentage of ingredients. Due to the novelty classification, sex toys may contain toxins such as phthalates, which have been banned in children's toys by the CPSC.

Before using a sex toy, owners should take precautions. One should check for tears, rough seams or cracks that could harm the inside of the vagina or anus. Condoms should also be used on porous sex toys and sex toys that are being shared between two or more partners. They should also use appropriate lubricants; silicone lube will break down silicone toys, and oil-based lubes will break down latex condoms.

With the rise of smart sex toys, so did concerns surrounding unwanted tracking or hacking that could occur due to database and API issues. In 2016, the security software company Trend Micro demonstrated that some Internet-connected electronic sex toys are vulnerable to cyberattacks, thus creating the field of onion dildonics. The ethical, legal, and privacy concerns are an area of active research by Sarah Jamie Lewis, amongst others. She warns that sex toys are just as vulnerable to malware as any other device, so manufacturers and companies should be more transparent about their data collection policies in order to protect users.

== Care ==
Cleaning sex toys is also very important for sexual health and sex toy safety. Cleaning them will avoid the potential of bacterial infection, transmission of STIs (if shared), or pregnancy (if sperm is present on the toy). Porous sex toys (ridged, flexible, soft and squishy) are difficult to clean and can hide bacteria that multiply and harm the human body. Non-porous toys are easier to clean, making them less potentially harmful. When cleaning sex toys, always use warm water and unscented anti-bacterial soap.

Anal toys (butt plugs, small dildos, etc.)

- When used in the anus, sex toys can easily get lost as rectal muscles contract and can suck an object upward, potentially obstructing the colon; to prevent this serious problem, it is recommended that individuals use sex toys with a flared base or a string.

Non-porous toys

- Hard plastic toys: do not boil the toy, and wash with soap and water.
- Silicone toys: put it on the top shelf of the dishwasher, boil for 5–10 minutes, or wash with water and soap.
- Stainless steel toys: boil or soak them in 1:10 bleach-water solution for ten minutes, put it on the top shelf of the dishwasher, or use soap and water (if there are electrical components to the toy).

Porous toys

- Cyberskin and vinyl toys: clean with warm water, air dry, and sprinkle it with a small amount of cornstarch (to keep them dry and not sticky).
- Nylon toys: put it in the top rack of the dishwasher or wash with soap and water.
- Rubber toys: cannot be properly cleaned because bacteria is absorbed into the material, so it is recommended to always use a condom.

== Legal issues ==
=== India ===
Sex toys are illegal in India. Selling sex toys is a punishable offense under section 292 of the Indian penal code, as sex toys are considered an "obscene" product. Besides sex toys, any book, pamphlet, paper, writing, drawing, painting, representation, figure or any other object, is also considered obscene by section 292 if it is lascivious or appeals to the prurient interest. The punishment for the offense is up to two years in prison.

However, a survey in The Lancet Regional Health - Southeast Asia reported that 98.5% of Indians had heard of sex toys, and that 40.6% had used sex toys.

=== Japan ===
In Japan, many dildos are created to resemble animals or cartoon characters, such as Hello Kitty, rabbits or dolphins, so that they may be sold as toys, thus avoiding obscenity laws.

=== Malaysia ===
In Malaysia, the sale and importation of sex toys is illegal.

=== South Africa ===
Section 18A of the Sexual Offenses Act, 1957, inserted by the Immorality Amendment Act, 1969, prohibited the manufacture or sale of any item "intended to be used to perform an unnatural sexual act". The term "unnatural sexual act" referred to any sex other than vaginal heterosexual sex, and this prohibition was ostensibly aimed at preventing the use of dildos by lesbians. No longer enforced, the section was repealed by the Criminal Law (Sexual Offences and Related Matters) Amendment Act, 2007.

=== United States ===
Sex toys and lubricants have become increasingly available in major commercial outlets in the United States. On-shelf displays tend to be more discreet than the offerings on web sites. These items tend to be displayed in the "sexual health" sections of stores.

Until recently, many Southern and some Great Plains states banned the sale of sex toys completely, either directly or through laws regulating "obscene devices". In 1999, William H. Pryor, Jr., an assistant attorney general in Alabama commenting on a case involving sex toys and discussing to what end the devices are used, was quoted as saying there is no "fundamental right for a person to buy a device to produce orgasm". A federal appeals court upheld Alabama's law prohibiting the sale of sex toys on Valentine's Day, 2007.

In February 2008, a federal appeals court overturned a Texas statute banning the sales of sex toys, deeming such a statute as violating the Constitution's 14th Amendment on the right to privacy. The appeals court cited Lawrence v. Texas, where the U.S. Supreme Court in 2003 struck down bans on consensual sex between gay couples, as unconstitutionally aiming at "enforcing a public moral code by restricting private intimate conduct". Similar statutes have been struck down in Kansas and Colorado.

Marty Klein, author of America's War on Sex and an advocate for the moral value of sex toys, has described the sex toy bans as a form of erotophobia and genophobia, claiming the "extraordinary erosion of personal liberty, coupled with the massive disrespect of and fear of sexuality is no joke" and that the "Supreme Court [of the United States] has declared our orgasms a battlefield, and sex toys another casualty."

=== Zimbabwe ===
A portion of the "censorship and entertainments control" law in Zimbabwe makes the possession and importation of sex toys illegal, because they are considered "obscene" or "indecent", and harmful to public morals. Being in possession of a sex toy or other prohibited and indecent material can result in a fine (up to a maximum level 6 or US$300) and/or imprisonment not exceeding one year.

=== Saudi Arabia ===
Under Saudi law, devices such as sex toys are treated as "pornographic material" and are prohibited. For example, customs in Saudi Arabia list "sex toys, items related to sex and/or obscene material" among the items banned from import.

Because Saudi law is largely based on Sharia ("Islamic law") and public morality codes, sex toys are effectively illegal even if the statute is not always explicitly phrased as such.

Importing, possessing, or using sex toys in Saudi Arabia carries a high risk of confiscation and possibly fines or other criminal consequences under obscenity or morality laws.

=== Kuwait ===
Kuwait treats sex toys and related products as restricted under public morality rules. The import/export of sex toys is prohibited. The media report instances where authorities found sex toys during enforcement actions in Kuwait.

While less detailed legislative information is available, enforcement practice and commentary suggest that there is a risk of seizure and legal consequences for the import, sale or possession of sex toys in Kuwait.

=== United Arab Emirates (UAE) ===
In the UAE, sex toys are generally treated under the umbrella of "obscene or immoral material". Importation, sale or possession of devices marketed as sexual aids may lead to their confiscation or legal penalties. The media report that "sexual toys and any device related to sexual content" are among prohibited items in Dubai and Abu Dhabi.

Despite the formal prohibition, a grey market operates in the UAE; many online outlets continue to sell sex toys openly, under their real product names rather than euphemistic descriptions. At the same time, more reputable local stores such as Noon feature a "Sexual Wellness" category offering predominantly lubricants, contraceptives and "family planning and enhancements" while appearing to avoid explicitly listing devices marketed solely as sex toys.

Nonetheless, documented cases show that both sellers and consumers have been subject to prosecution or deportation when caught importing or distributing these goods.

=== Qatar ===
Although legislative detail is sparse in readily available sources, travel advice and general commentary indicate that sex toys are considered "obscene objects" in Qatar and importation or travel with them may be illegal.

=== Thailand ===
Under Thai law, sex toys fall under the category of "obscene objects" and are thus subject to prohibition. A legal study based on the Thai Penal Code and the Customs Act states that while there is no explicit legal prohibition of sex toys, they are "practically prohibited through legal interpretation as obscene objects" by law enforcement agencies.

News articles report that sale, import, possession of sex toys in Thailand can carry up to three years’ imprisonment or significant fines.

== Industry ==
As of 2023, the sex toy industry is estimated to be valued at $35.2 billion worldwide. By 2030, the predicted value of this industry may rise to $62.7 billion. Seventy percent of sex toys are manufactured in China. Sex toys are sold in various types of local and online sex shops, at conventions associated with the adult industry, and at parties. However, some items, such as "hand-held massagers", are sold in mainstream retail outlets such as drugstores. The rise of online shopping/retailers contributed to the rapid growth of the sex toy industry, making them easy and discreet to buy. After COVID-19 lockdowns, sex toy sales increased by 60%.

== In popular culture ==
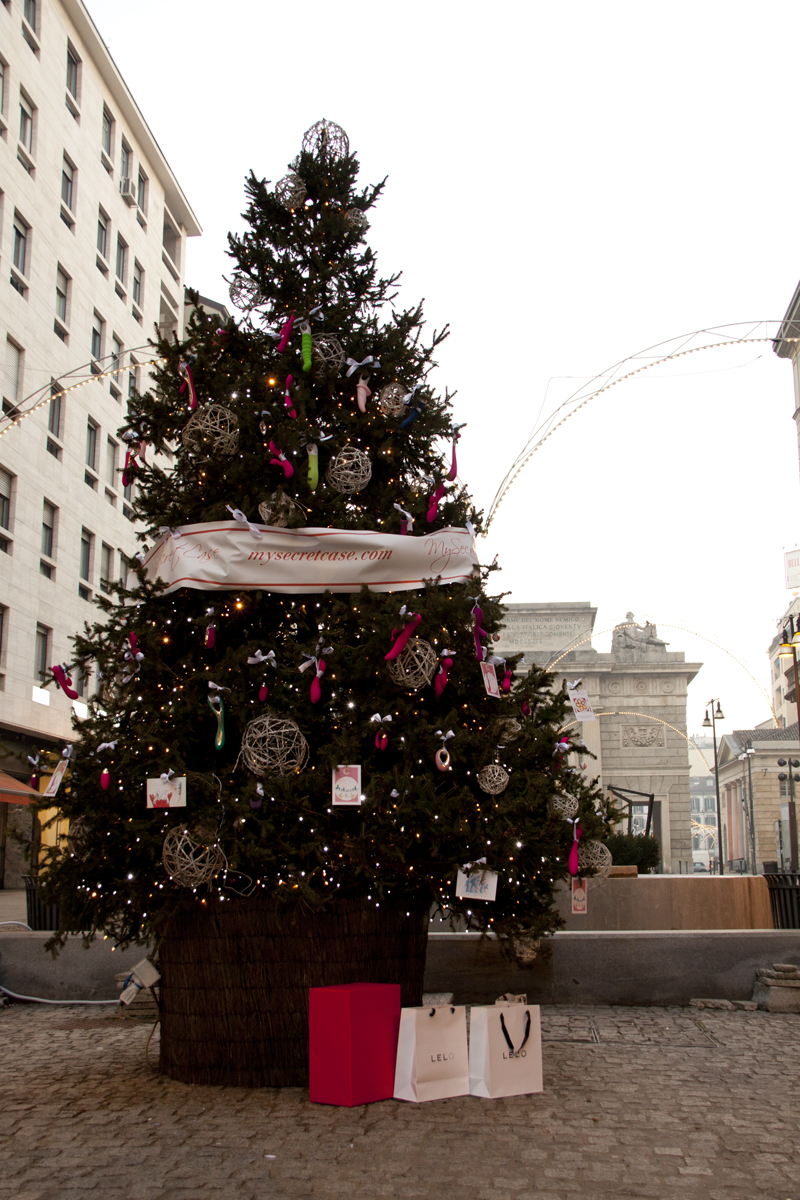
Christmas tree decorated with sex toys, Milan, Italy, 2013

- On Millionaire Matchmaker, "Sex Toy Dave" Levine - who earned a fortune selling adult toys and wanted Patti to find him a mate, preferably bisexual, who would accept him as he is - was featured as one of Patti Stanger's clients.
- On Real Housewives of Atlanta, Kandi Burruss frequently discusses, displays, and gives other cast members gifts from her sex toy line, "Bedroom Kandi", which she also promotes via her online show, Kandi Koated Nights.

== Research ==
Sex toys have been the subject of scientific research in different disciplines (e.g., medicine, clinical psychology, sexology, queer studies) for decades.

Some questionnaire and interview studies on the prevalence of sex toy have shown that people of all genders and all sexual identities use sex toys during solo sex (masturbation) and - somewhat less frequently - during partner sex. In some countries (e.g., Australia, China, Germany, USA) sex toys are normalized, i.e. they are already used by large sections of the population, sometimes by the majority of the population. These studies also that members of the LGBTQ+ community are more likely to have used a vibrator before, with around half of gay or bisexual men and over 75% of lesbian or bisexual women having used one before.

The Internet has contributed to the popularization of sex toys, since information searches about and the purchase of sex toys can now be carried out discreetly online.

Many women do not insert vibrators, but use them externally for direct clitoral stimulation, either during masturbation or during intercourse. Homosexual identified men, on the other hand, report much more frequently that they use vibrators for anal insertion.

According to a 2016 study in Signs: Journal of Women in Culture and Society, in Mexico City, women sometimes buy sex toys to punish their male partners, typically for infidelity.

=== Positive and negative effects of sex toy use ===
The meanings and implications of sex toys are controversially discussed in academia. Many authors endorse them for fostering sexual empowerment, while some criticize sex toys for pushing the commercialization of sex.

Most empirical studies show that people of all genders and sexual identities experience the use of sex toys predominantly positively. In questionnaires and interviews, they report an increase in sexual arousal and satisfaction, the facilitation of orgasms (especially for women), the exploration of new preferences, a playful approach to sex and the fun of something new during sex. There are decidedly feminist or women-oriented sex toy stores and sex toy party organizations that link the sale of sex toys with sexual education and aim to support women's sexual empowerment. Further positive effects are reported from clinical settings: Sex toys are used therapeutically, for example, in the context of therapy for orgasm disorders. They can also enable people with disabilities to have more sexual self-determination.

It may also help couples feel more satisfied with sex. One surveying 50 couples found that both men and women in heterosexual couples often appreciate the addition of a toy, possibly because it reduced performance pressure for men and increased the excitement women had for sex. There are conflicting opinions in the literature about whether sex toys contribute to performance pressure.

Some empirical research has demonstrated negative effects of sex toy use such as sexually transmitted infections (when sex toys are shared without proper cleaning or without barrier methods such as condoms), injuries (e.g., from anal insertion of toys unsuitable for anal use), or allergies. Some women also report that they are urged by their partners to use sex toys even though they do not want to.

== See also ==
- Anti-Obscenity Enforcement Act
- Arse Elektronika, sex and technology conference
- Genital jewellery
- Hysteria, film about 1880 invention of first vibrator
- List of BDSM equipment
- Lovense, a trademark of company producing sex toys controlled via Bluetooth
- Sex doll
- Sex machine
- Sex robot
- Sex shop
- Sex toy industry in China
- Sex toy party
- Teledildonics, remote controlled sex toys
