= X-cross (BDSM) =

BDSM restraint device

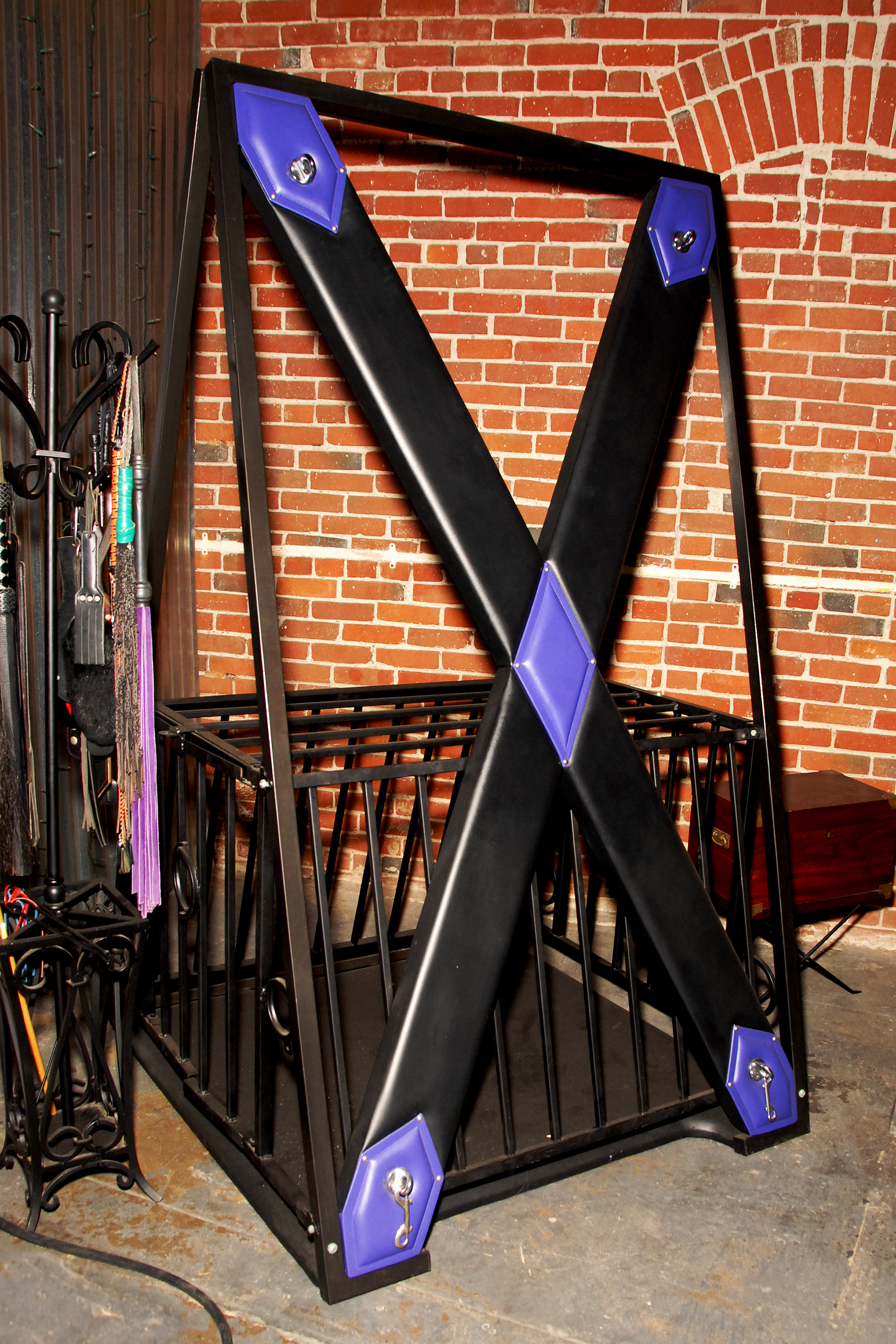
An X-cross

The X-cross is a piece of sex furniture consisting of two diagonal X-shaped bars to which a submissive is secured, typically using restraining points at the ankles, wrists, and waist. It is a common piece of equipment in BDSM dungeons. When secured to an X-cross, the subject is restrained in a standing spreadeagle position. The size of the cross needs to match that of the person attached to it. Other names used for the X-cross include X-frame, bondage cross, Saint Andrew's cross and saltire cross.

X-crosses are versatile and easy to manufacture. They are usually made of steel or wood, sometimes padded with leather, and oftentimes firmly attached to a wall. The "bondage wheel" variant has a central axle, allowing occupants to be turned upside down.

The submissive may be attached to the X-cross with either the back or front facing the cross. Being restrained facing the cross is the position often used for whipping. Being attached with one's back to the cross is usually used for sexual teasing or as a sexual bondage position as it holds the submissive's legs in a spread position and allows for orgasm. The submissive's feeling of helplessness can be erotic for them and for their dominant partner.

The X-cross may be purchased from BDSM companies, but many users make their own. Some homemade X-crosses are freestanding, built into a frame that supports the cross. These have a tendency to be unstable and are considered significantly less safe than models that are firmly attached to a wall. A writhing subject can sometimes tip them over, so great caution needs to be exercised in their use. Some freestanding X-crosses include footrests that greatly improve safety and stability.
