= ISO 3533 =

Safety standard for sex toys

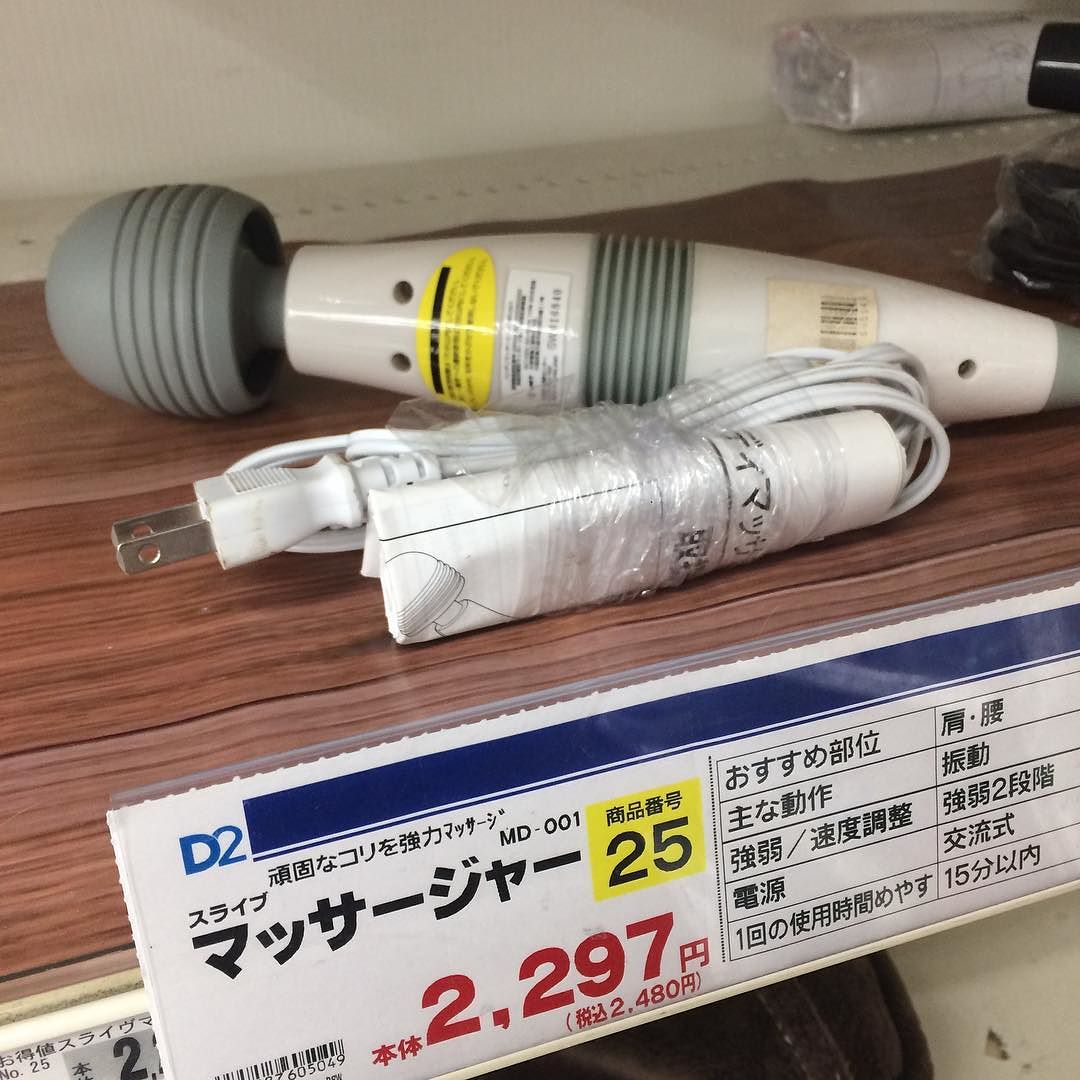
Besides ISO 3533, toys need to be compliant to the IEC 60335 standard for household appliances

The ISO 3533 standard defines the safety requirements for sex toys.

== History ==
The standard stems from efforts from the Swedish standards agency SIS to introduce a quality norm for sex toys after studies showed an increase of cases in Swedish emergency rooms of rectal foreign bodies, caused by badly designed sex toys. The Swedish proposal was consequentially adopted by ANSI, who then released a RfC for stakeholders in the sex toy industry. The discussion resulted in 2021 in a first release of the norm, as ISO 3533:2021.

== Requirements (non-exhaustive list) ==
Among the requirements this norm imposes on manufacturers:

- Equipment like buttplugs or anal beads that may enter the anus and rectum have to be designed in such a way that they will not get stuck, and that easy extraction by medical personnel should be feasible.
- Toys such as chastity belts, cock rings and bondage cuffs must be easily removable in the case of emergency or loss of keys with common household tools such as pliers.
- Toys that may enter bodily orifices should be free of burrs or sharp edges that might cause cuts.

== Related ==
- List of International Organization for Standardization standards
