= Legends of Catherine the Great =

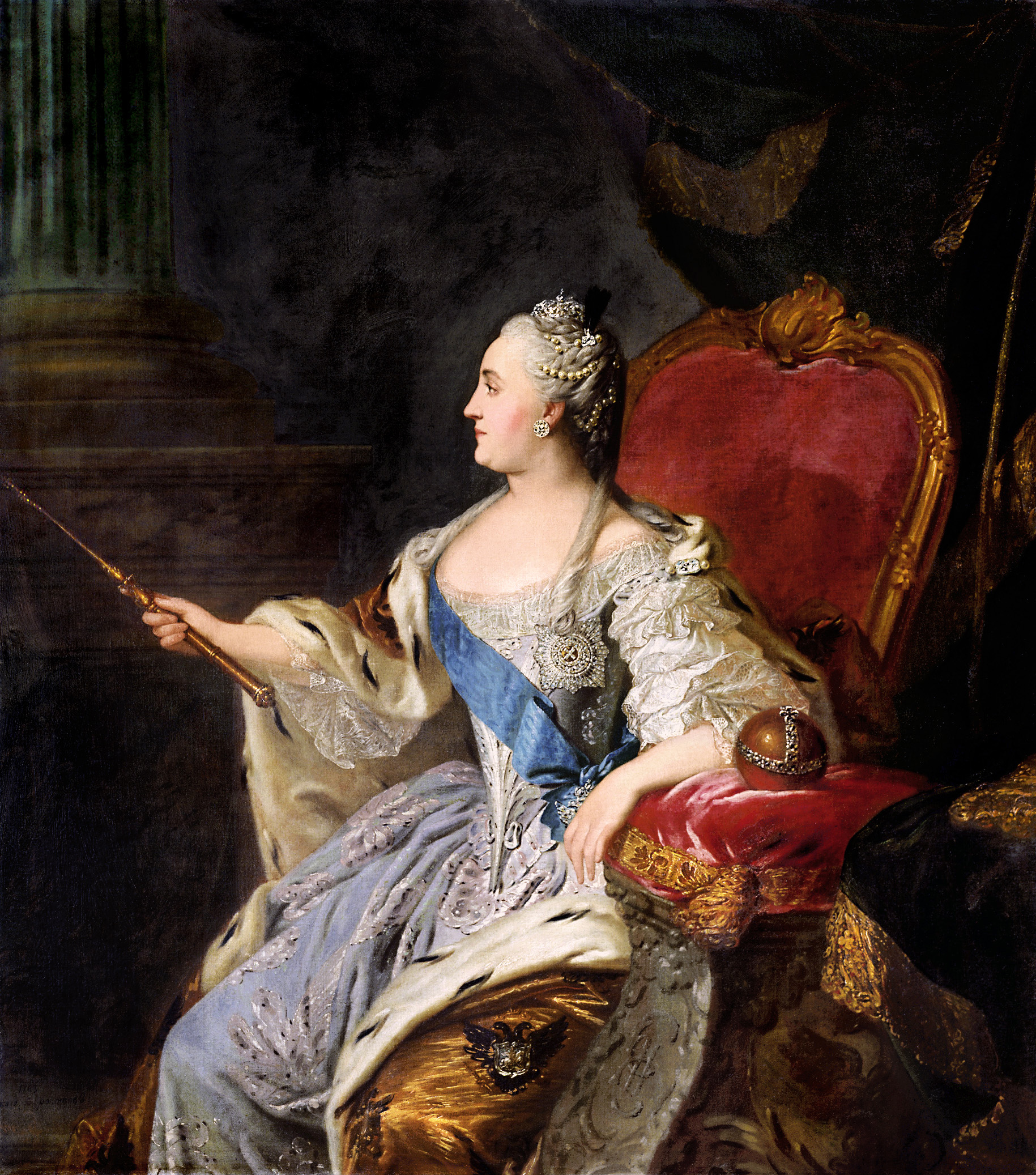
Empress Catherine the Great is popularly remembered for her promiscuity.

During and after the reign of the Empress Catherine II of Russia, whose long rule led to the modernisation of the Russian Empire, many urban legends arose, some based on true events, concerning her sexual behaviour.

Catherine had about 22 male lovers throughout her life, some of whom would reap political benefits from their relationship with her, and many of whom were younger than she. In addition to her sexual relationships, her multiple relationships with Russian nobles, allegations of her being a nymphomaniac or a libertine, rumours that she liked to collect erotic furniture, and an atmosphere of palace intrigue cultivated by her son Paul I of Russia, led to unflattering portrayals of Catherine. Some called her the "Messalina of the Neva", while others termed her a nymphomaniac. There is also a legend that she died while having sex with a horse.

== Personal life narratives ==
Rumours of Catherine's private life had a small basis in the fact that she took many young lovers, even in old age. This practice was not unusual by the court standards of the day, nor was it unusual to use rumor and innuendo of sexual excess politically. One of her early lovers, Stanisław August Poniatowski, was later supported by her to become a king of Poland. Catherine frequently promoted her lovers to political positions in order to solidify her own rule and strengthen her support. For example, Grigory Orlov, an artillery officer from St. Petersburg, helped the queen in the coup against Peter III, and when the Queen took power, she rewarded him by making him a count, as well as naming him General-In-Chief.

One unfavorable rumor was that Alexander Dmitriev-Mamonov and her later lovers were chosen by her favourite and consort Grigori Potemkin after the end of their long relationship, where he, perhaps, was her morganatic husband. After Mamonov eloped from the 60-year-old Empress with a 16-year-old maid of honour and married her, the embittered Catherine reputedly revenged herself of her rival "by secretly sending policemen disguised as women to whip her in her husband's presence", though another account claims that there is no truth in this story. Another unfavorable rumor concerned the legitimacy of her children. Many suspected that the queen's children were not in fact fathered by Emperor Peter III, but by some of the lovers she had taken. Her children Ana and Alexei were also rumored to be illegitimate, and some historians even question the legitimacy of Paul I, due to the fact he was conceived so late into their marriage.

According to some contemporaries close to Catherine, Countess Praskovya Bruce was prized by her as "L'éprouveuse", or "tester of male capacity". Every potential lover was to spend a night with Bruce before he was admitted into Catherine's personal apartments. Their friendship was cut short when Bruce was found "in an assignment" with Catherine's young lover, Ivan Rimsky-Korsakov, ancestor of the composer Nikolai Rimsky-Korsakov; they both later withdrew from the imperial court to Moscow.

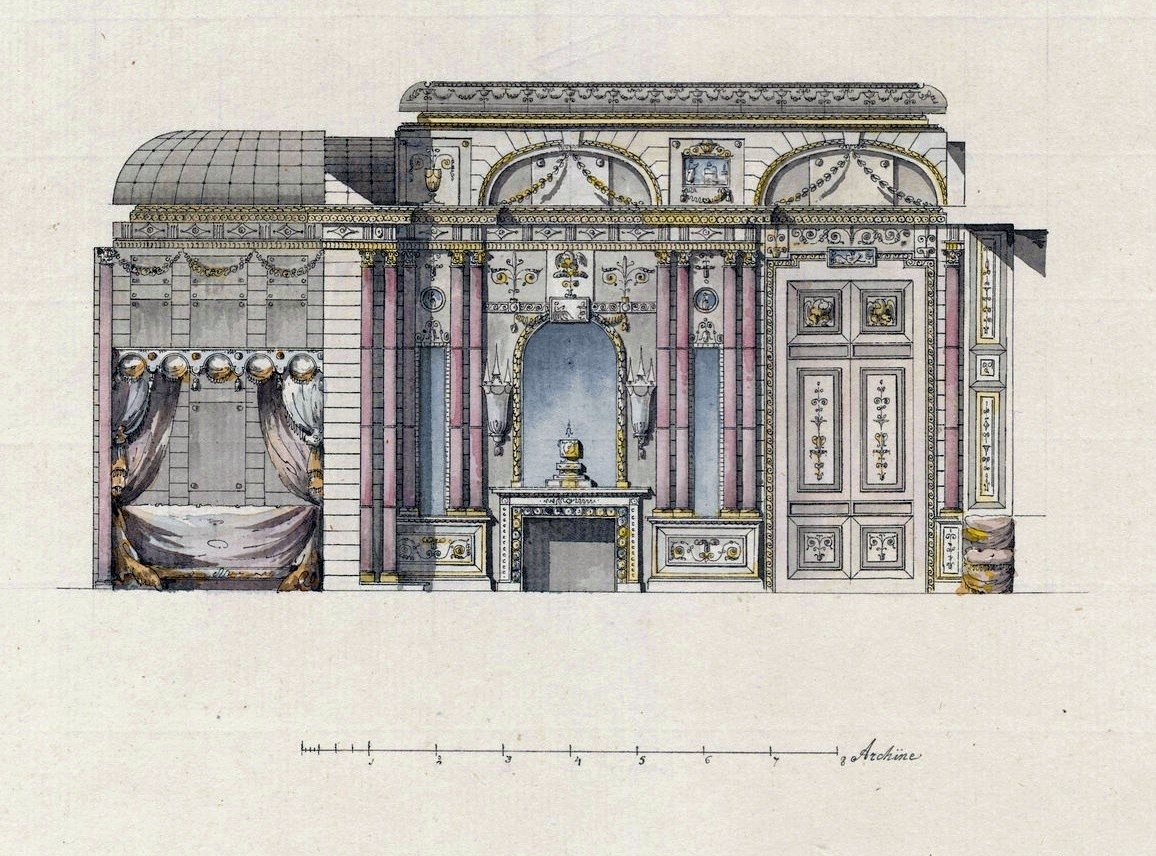
Catherine II's bedroom in the so-called Zubov Wing of the Catherine Palace in Tsarskoye Selo was constructed between 1781 and 1783 and adorned with thin plates of milky white polished glass; contemporary drawing in the National Museum in Warsaw.

In his memoirs, Charles François Philibert Masson wrote that Catherine had "two passions, which never left her but with her last breath: the love of man, which degenerated into licentiousness, and the love of glory, which sank into vanity. By the first of these passions, she was never so far governed as to become a Messalina, but she often disgraced both her rank and sex: by the second, she was led to undertake many laudable projects, which were seldom completed, and to engage in unjust wars, from which she derived at least that kind of fame which never fails to accompany success".

Her love life inspired Lord Byron's poem Don Juan, who, aged 22, fictitiously becomes her lover after the Siege of Izmail. The poem was written about 25 years after Catherine's death in 1796.

== Death narratives ==
=== Death while having sex with a horse ===
Several stories about the circumstances of her death at age 67 in 1796 originated in the years following her death. An urban legend claims that she died as a result of her attempting sexual intercourse with a stallion—the story holds that the harness holding the horse above her broke and she was crushed.

=== Death while in the bathroom ===
Another story claims that she died on the toilet when her seat broke under her; this is partly true in that she did collapse in a bathroom from a stroke and died in her bed a day later.

This tale was widely circulated and even jokingly referred to by Aleksander Pushkin in one of his untitled poems (Наказ писала, флоты жгла, / И умерла, садясь на судно.—lit. 'Decreed the orders, burned the fleets / And died boarding a vessel'; the last line can also be translated as 'And died sitting down on the toilet'). There also existed a version on alleged assassination, by spring blades hidden in a toilet seat.

== The erotic cabinet ==
An urban legend states that an erotic cabinet was ordered by Catherine the Great and was adjacent to her suite of rooms in Gatchina Palace. According to said legend, the furniture of the boudoir was highly eccentric, with statues of naked men and women, the walls being covered in erotic art, and some versions of the legend state that some erotic artifacts from Pompeii were brought to add to this collection.

There are two unconfirmed photographs of this cabinet. These photographs show an unusual pair of furniture that includes a chair with armrests covered in carved figures mid-coitus and a table that had large penises for legs and decorated with breasts, penises, and vulvae. A recreation of the table was sold by Sotheby's in 2017. The rooms and the furniture were allegedly seen in 1941 by two Wehrmacht officers during the Nazi invasion of the Soviet Union; other accounts describe Soviet officers stumbling upon the room. In either case, no official reports exist on the room and its furnishings and the objects are believed to be destroyed due to Nazi bombings. Personnel at the Hermitage Museum support the idea that erotic art was commonly collected among the Romanovs, but the furniture in the photos cannot be definitively attributed to Catherine. For these reasons, historians challenge the veracity of the erotic cabinet claims, especially considering this story was likely fabricated some years after Catherine the Great's death.

== Other narratives ==
- A long-surviving legend about the Potemkin villages states that Potemkin built fake settlements with hollow façades to fool Catherine during her visit to Crimea and New Russia, the territories Russia had conquered under her reign. Modern historians, however, consider this scenario at best an exaggeration, and quite possibly simply a malicious rumor spread by Potemkin's opponents.
- Not a native speaker of Russian, Catherine misspelled eщё ([jɪɕˈɕo] 'more'), written with three letters, as истчо ([ɪstˈtɕo]), consisting of five letters, and that allegedly gave rise to a popular Russian joke: how can five mistakes occur in a word of three letters? (The letter ё was not widely accepted until the 1940s).
- After Catherine granted to Kazan's Muslims the right to build mosques, the city's Christian leadership decided that mosques were being built too high—higher than churches. They sent a petition to Catherine asking her to prohibit the construction of high minarets. As the legend goes, Catherine replied that she was the tsarina of the Russian land and that the sky was beyond her jurisdiction.
- The Polish-Jewish religious leader Jacob Frank spread the rumor that his daughter Eve Frank was Catherine's illegitimate daughter.

== Bibliography ==
- М. Евгеньева, "Любовники Екатерины." – Москва: Внешторгиздат, 1989 (in Russian, M. Yevgen'yeva, "Lovers of Catherine", Moscow, Vneshtorgizdat, 1989)
- Beccia, Carlyn "Raucous Royals" Houghton Mifflin, 2008
- Lewis, Jone Johnson. "Biography of Catherine the Great, Empress of Russia." ThoughtCo, ThoughtCo, 21 July 2019, www.thoughtco.com/catherine-the-great-p2-3528624.
- Mcilvenna, Una. "How Catherine the Great's Enemies Used Sex to Tarnish Her Reputation." History.Com, 27 Nov. 2018, www.history.com/news/catherine-the-great-enemies-sex-myths
