= Sex toy industry in China =

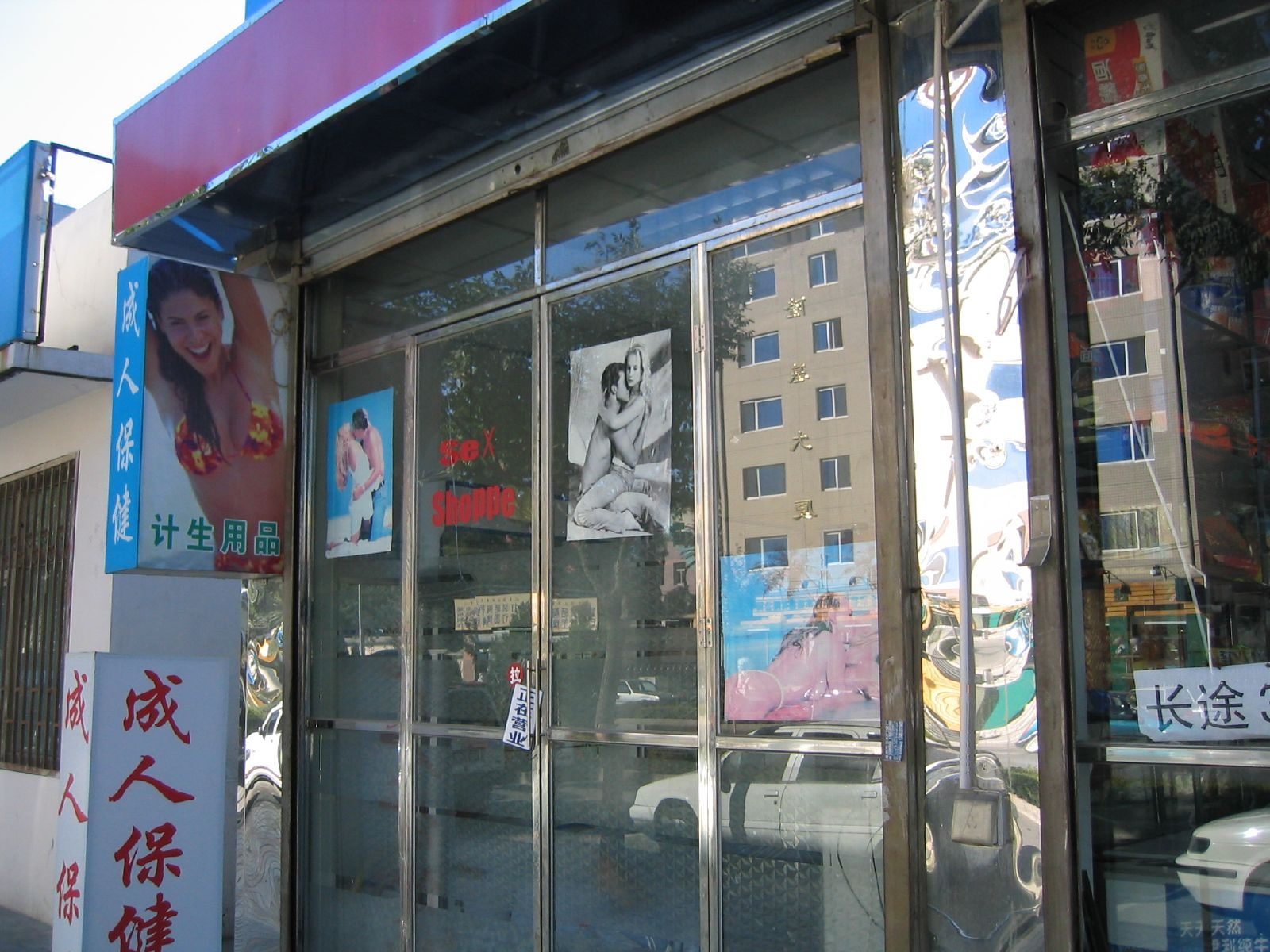
A sex shop in China

The sex toy industry in China is the largest in the world, with 70% of the world's sex toys being manufactured there. The value of the sex toy industry in the country is estimated at US$2 billion, with over 1,000 manufacturers nationwide.

According to a report by the China Market Research Centre, the revenue from this industry for January to May 2010, reached US$940 million. The report noted the best-selling items were products that enhance sexual arousal, such as stimulus condoms, which constitute 21.5% of the market.

Ma Xiaonian, the deputy director of China Sexology Association, has said that China has developed considerably in terms of sexual culture since the opening of the first sex shop in Beijing in 1993. From a time when adult products, including condoms, were not even allowed to be imported into China, the sex toy manufacturing industry in China has rapidly grown to become the world's biggest. China is the world leader in labour-intensive manufacturing in general.

According to reports in the People's Daily, the biggest export market is to South Africa (almost 20%), with South Korea and Russia being the second and third largest importers, and the United States accounting for 2% of the market.

There are also a number of foreign sex toy manufacturing companies that have invested in China. These companies have invested in either the production, trading or marketing of their products in the Chinese market.

== Trade fairs ==
Adult industry trade fairs are held annually in Guangzhou, Wuhan, Macau, Fujian, Beijing and Shanghai. In Shanghai, the China International Adult Toys and Reproductive Health Exhibition, commonly known as the China Adult-Care Expo, is held every year in the Shanghai International Exhibition Center. In the China Adult-Care Expo 2004, there were more than 4,000 participants and more than 80,000 visitors. China Adult-Care Expo 2005 was the biggest of its kind in Asia and one of the top three expos for sex toys in the world, along with VENUS in Berlin, Germany and AVN Adult Entertainment Expo in Las Vegas, United States.

One hundred and eighty exhibitors from eight countries and regions, such as China, the United States, South Korea, Sweden, and Hong Kong participated in the 5th China International Adult Toys and Reproductive Health Exhibition, held in 2008. The number of visitors in the China Adult-Care Expo 2008 was over 30,000. The China Adult-Care Expo is organized by the China International Exhibition Center Group Corporation. Macau has been hosting the Asia Adult Expo since 2008. In 2010 eroFame in Hanover, Germany, was established as the world's biggest B2B fair for the adult industry.
