= Sex toy party =

Meeting for the sale of sex toys in a fun environment

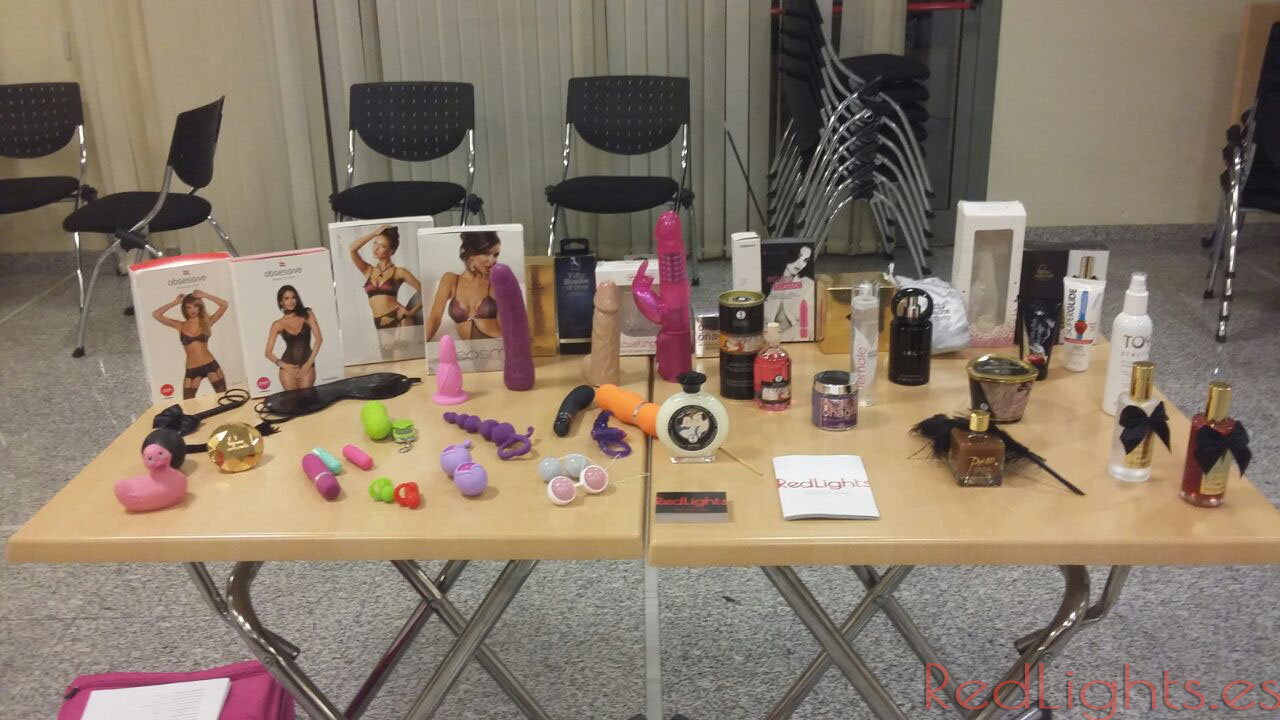
The merchandise is presented to the potential buyers.

A sex toy party is a usually female-only gathering where participants learn about and buy sex toys. It is a type of party plan, similar to MLM and Tupperware parties.

The party may start with an icebreaker game, then a sex toy representative, or 'facilitator', displays and discusses the products. Some parties may feature products from companies like Lovense, which develop sex technology like remotely controlled sex toys and products for pleasure and online sex toy parties. Although the discussion is sexually explicit, euphemisms such as 'button' for clitoris are common. The participants examine and talk about the products, with the option of purchasing them from the representative in a private room at the end of the party. Other merchandise such as bath salts, aromatherapy, and body paints are more commonly sold. The representative receives commission based on the sales from the party. There are thousands of representatives of sex toy party companies in the United States.

Sex toy parties began in the 1970s, and became increasingly popular in the late 1980s and early 1990s. The marketing practices of sex toy parties have encouraged alternative sexual practices. The popularity of sex toy parties has suggested to be related to self-help and self-actualization.

According to research studies conducted by scientists such as Debby Herbenick and Michael Reece of Indiana University, sex toy representatives are often asked for advice on sexual health, and many have a background working in sex education, health, education, or sexuality. Some romance companies do permit males at their sex toy parties.

A woman was arrested in Texas in December 2003 on obscenity charges for hosting a sex toy party for undercover narcotics officers, but the case was dismissed by the judge in July 2004.
