= Liberator Shapes =

Pillows designed for sexual positioning

Liberator Shapes are adult pillows used for sexual positioning made by Liberator Inc., which is also known as OneUp Innovations. They are an example of erotic furniture. Patented as "creating a wide variety of body support configurations" and when the cushions are stacked, "adapted to provide frictional contact" to help eliminate movement, Liberator Shapes were the first sex pillows on the market and are known for their Valkyrie logo.

== Appearance in popular culture ==
The Liberator Wedge and Ramp appeared in the 2004 movie Meet the Fockers in which Rozalin Focker (played by Barbra Streisand) teaches a sexuality class for senior citizens.

The Liberator Ramp was featured in the 2008 Coen Brothers film Burn After Reading. George Clooney's character carries the Ramp up to his bed and later on Brad Pitt, hiding in the closet, stares at the pillow for a few seconds with a puzzled look on his face.

The Liberator Wedge was in an episode of Master of None, in which Aziz Ansari's character says about the product, "It's not a pillow, it's a firm wedge" when trying to convince his sexual partner to use it with him.
