= Sex swing =

Harness used for sexual intercourse

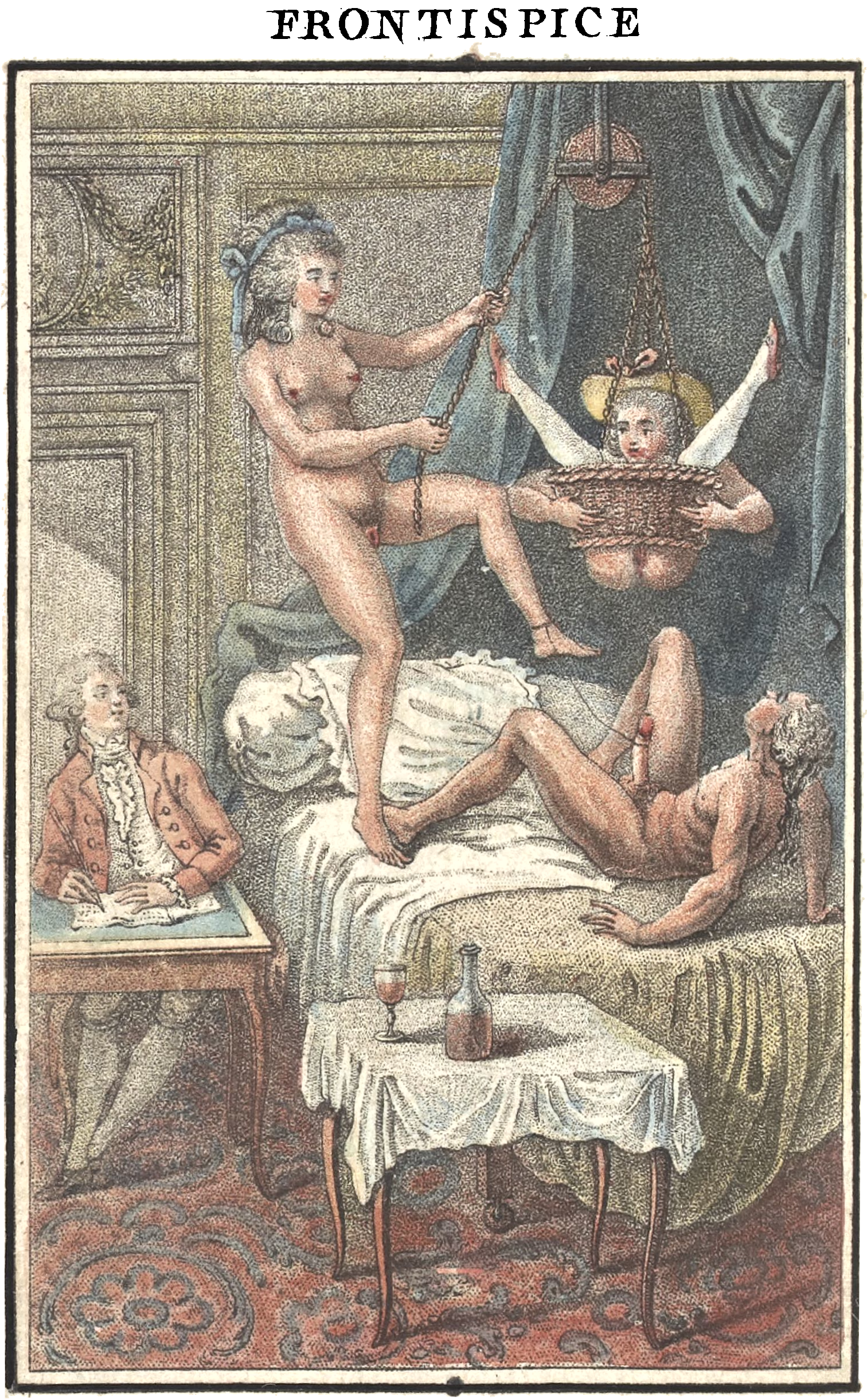
Frontispiece from the 1787 book La matinée libertine, ou, Les momens bien employés ("The Libertine Morning, or, Moments Well Spent")

A sex swing (also known as a sling) is a type of harness designed to allow sexual intercourse between one partner suspended by the swing and another who moves freely. Though there is considerable variety in the design, the most common sex swings have a support for the back, another for the buttocks, and stirrups for each leg, which can be adjusted whilst the user is suspended.

== Description ==
A sex swing or sling is designed to assist in sexual activity. Materials for constructing these devices include nylon webbing, heavy canvas, leather, neoprene, heavy rubber, wood, and steel. The designs provide access to the passive (receptive) partner's genitalia, perineum, buttocks, and anal areas while supporting the individual in a comfortable position, with the hips flexed, allowing the passive partner to fully relax.

== Types ==
There are many variations of swings that can be broken down to four basic types: sex slings, sex swings, door sex swings and body sex swings.

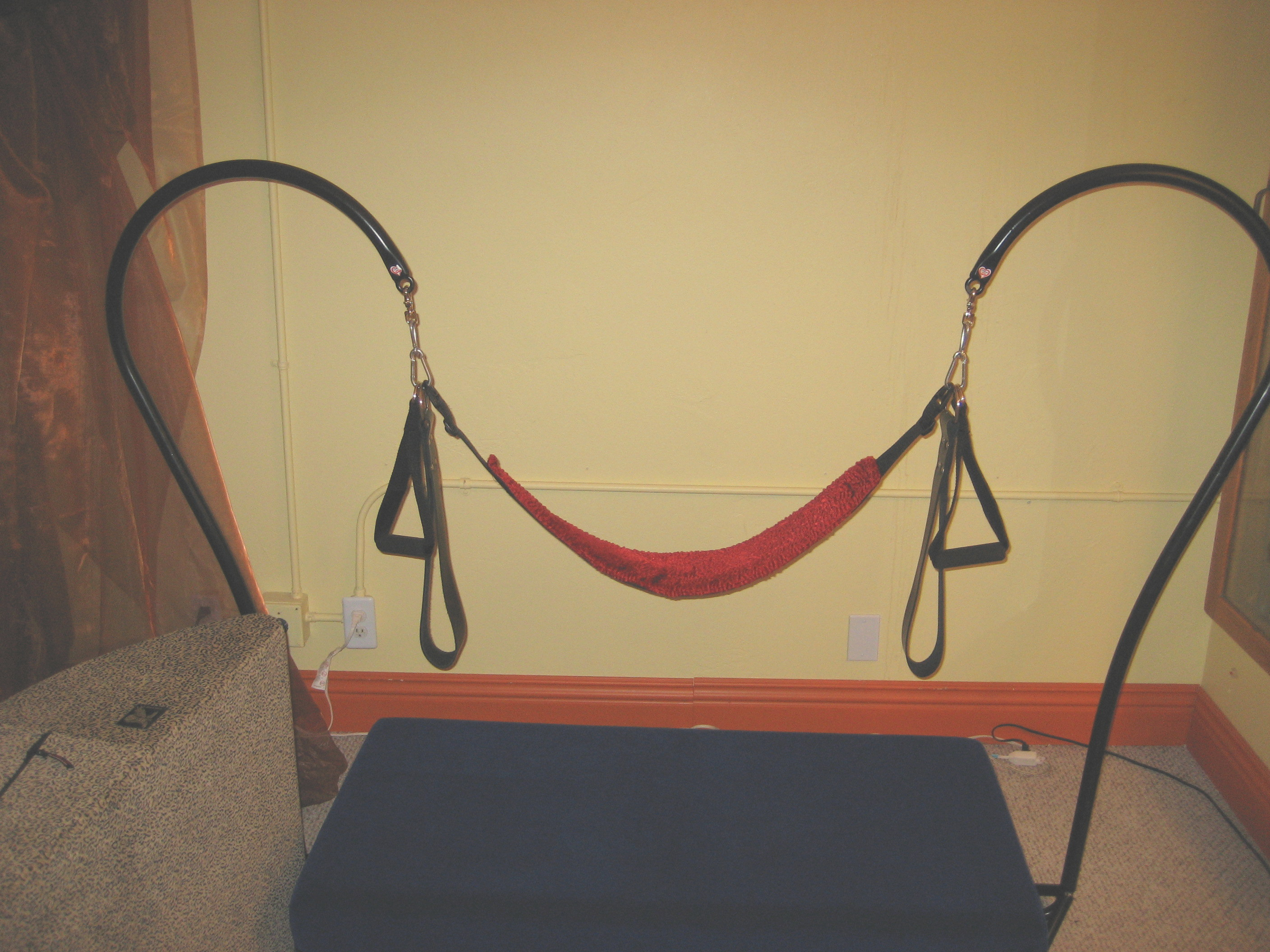
A sex swing

Sex slings are a category of sex swings that include a large panel to support the entire body. These can generally be constructed from leather, fabric or wood. Sex slings can range from 1 to 5 mounting points depending on design, with 4 points being the most common. A sex sling has a more limited number of position options than some other swing styles. Subcategories include traditional sex slings and platform sex slings.

Traditional sex swings are composed of 2 primary straps and stirrups. Additional options such as handles and headrests are available. There are many installation options including ceiling hooks, stands and between the walls in a hallway. The traditional sex swing has the largest number of position options available. Subcategories include pinning swings, bondage swings, single hook swings, and dual hook swings.

Door sex swings are a type of sling that installs over a door. It is secured in place by the door frame. Door swings have a limited range or positions options but are favored because of the quick installation. Standard door swings include leg straps and optionally handles. Deluxe door swings add an additional seat strap. Subcategories include standard door swings and deluxe door swings.

Body sex swings are a harness that is worn on the body with handles and leg straps to support another person to facilitate standing sex positions.

== Purpose ==
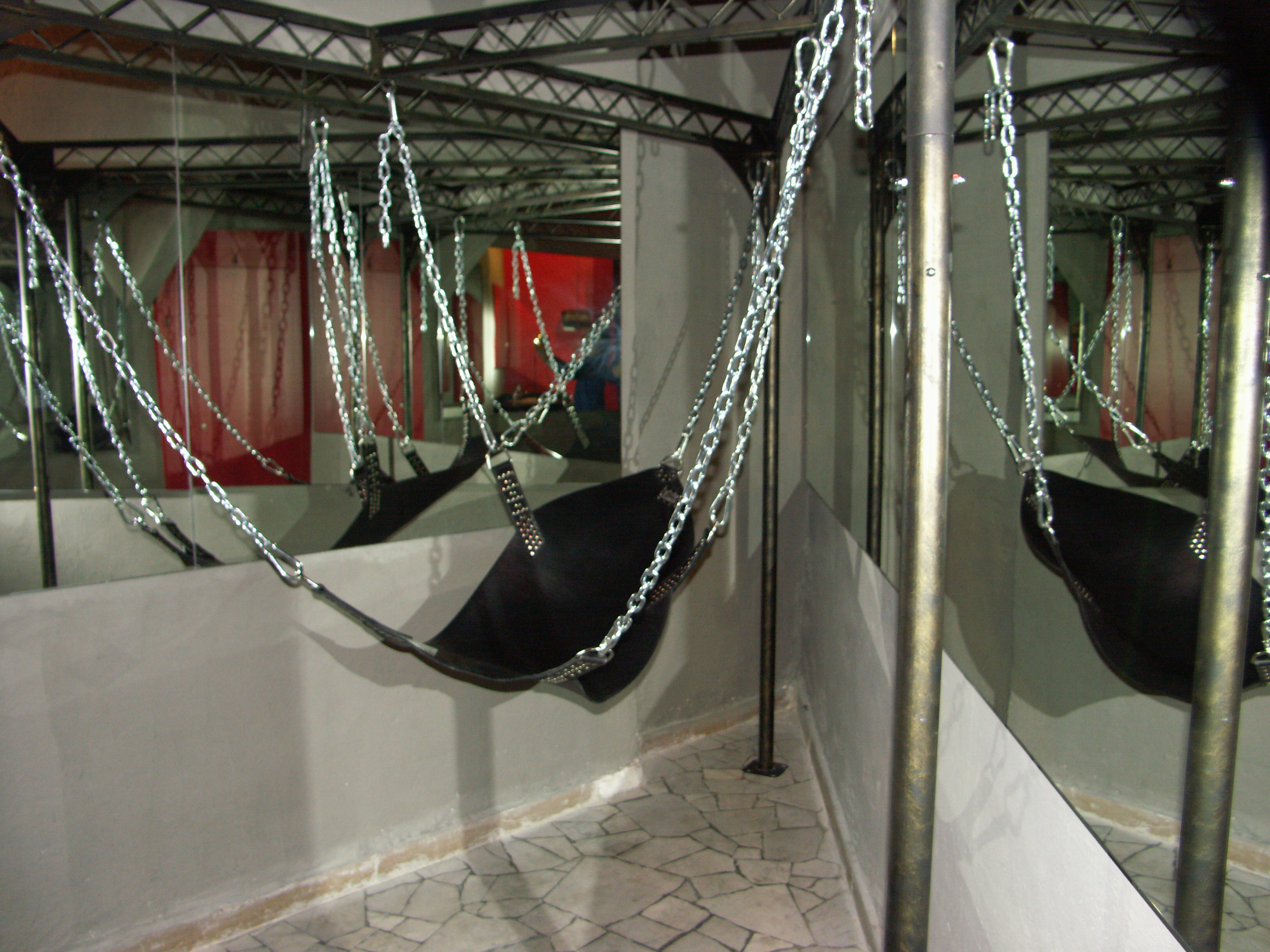
Hammock-style sling for sexual activity

The main purpose of sex swings is to make sexual intercourse more exciting and effortless. A sex swing may enable greater freedom of movement during intercourse or assist with challenging sex positions. Swings may also be used by couples who are into BDSM, since it acts like bondage where the partner in the swing has very little to no control. Swings may be used for vaginal and anal sex, fellatio, and cunnilingus.

Sex swings can enable individuals with a physical impairment or disability to enjoy a wide range of sexual activities. Individuals with muscular weakness or arthritis may use a sex swing to reduce the strain on affected muscles or joints. Individuals who use a wheelchair can engage in sexual activity using a sex swing suspended from a hoist.

== Safety ==
It is important to follow the provided instructions when using a sex swing. Secure mounting is vital to avoid injury to the suspended partner from falling; toggle bolts would generally be insufficient. Installing springs, if supplied, is important to reduce physical shock to the suspended partner caused by rapid deceleration when bouncing in a sex swing.
