= Male hysteria =

Psychiatric diagnosis made during World War I

In the nineteenth and early twentieth century, hysteria was a common psychiatric diagnosis made primarily in women. The existence and nature of a purported male hysteria (hysteria masculina) was a debated topic around the turn of the century. It was originally believed that men could not suffer from hysteria because of their lack of uterus. This belief was discarded in the 17th century when discourse identified the brain or mind, and not reproductive organs, as the root cause of hysteria. During World War I, hysterical men were diagnosed with shell shock or war neurosis, which later went on to shape modern theories on PTSD. The notion of male hysteria was initially connected to the post-traumatic disorder known as railway spine; later, it became associated with war neurosis.

== History ==
In the second half of the nineteenth century, hysteria was well-established as a diagnosis for certain psychiatric disorders. Although the original anatomical explanation of hysteria, the so-called wandering womb, was by this point abandoned, the diagnoses remained associated with (gender stereotypes of) females and female sexuality in the minds of physicians. Hysteria was joined in 1866 by a diagnosis for a very similar set of symptoms: railway spine, a nervous disorder caused by witnessing the accidents that the dangerous railways of the time generated in large numbers. John Eric Erichsen, who first diagnosed railway spine, explicitly rejected the hysteria diagnosis for his patients. He argued that diagnosing men with hysteria was unreasonable, "this term [being] employed merely to cloak a want of precise knowledge as to the real pathological state". Herbert Page, by contrast, argued for the hysteria label, finding what Erichsen called railway spine a functional disorder that was too similar to hysteria to warrant a separate diagnosis.

The situation gradually began to change: in 1859, Paul Briquet remarked that "we saw little hysteria in men because we did not want to see it", and between 1875 and 1902, some three hundred medical articles were devoted to the topic of male hysteria, as well as dozens of dissertations.

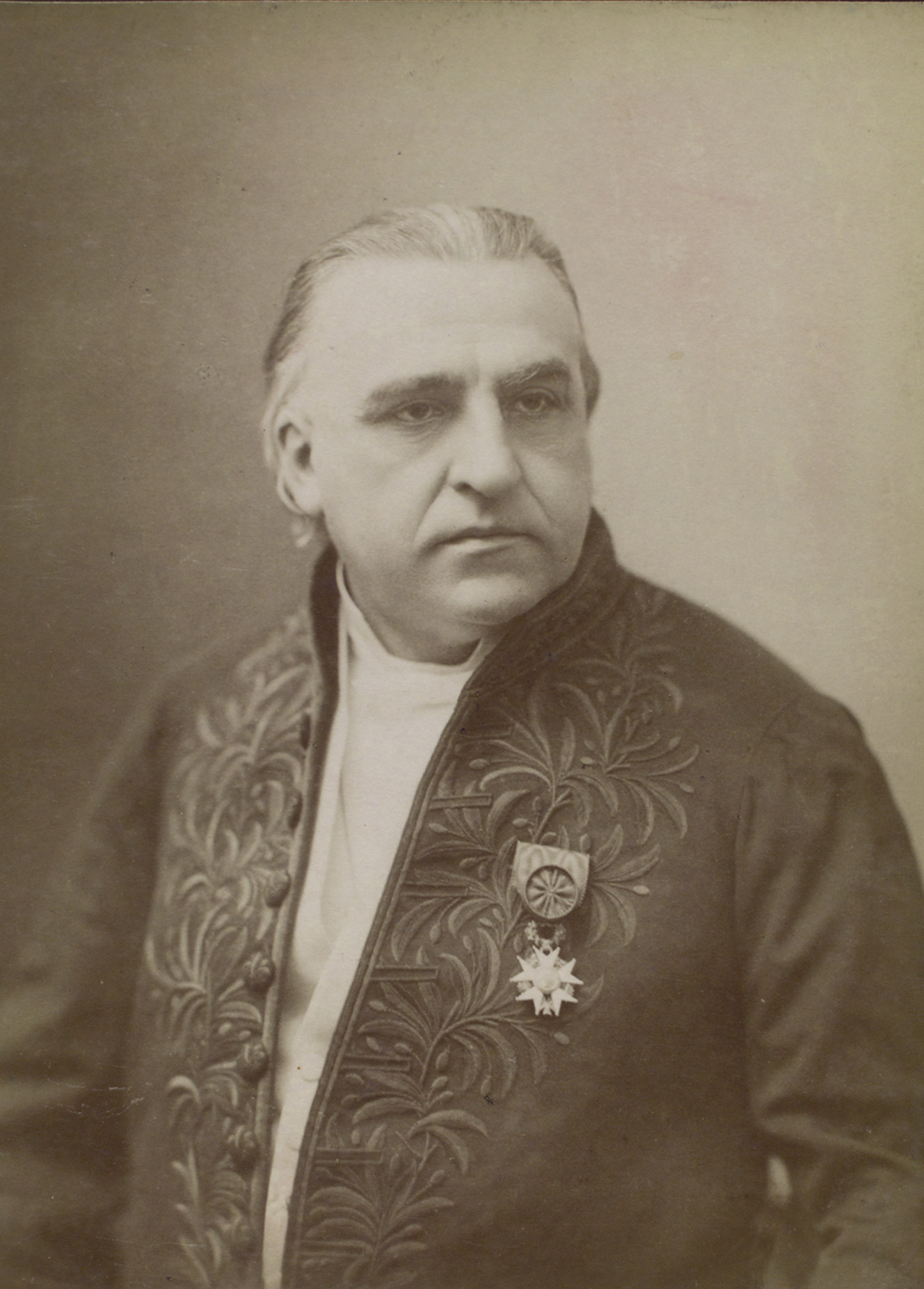
Jean-Martin Charcot.

Statistical work in the 1880s finally turned the conception of hysteria on its head. In 1882, Jean-Martin Charcot had made a "radical" move by citing Briquet's estimate of hysteria having a 1:20 ratio of incidence in males compared to females, and added a section for male sufferers of hysteria to his Paris hospital, the Salpetrière. A subsequent German study came up with a 1:10 ratio, Georges Gilles de la Tourette then published a 1:2 or 1:3 estimate, and finally Charcot and his student Pierre Marie did a study of 704 cases of patients displaying symptoms of hysteria, finding that 525 of them were males. Before long, the French army became interested in the diagnosis and the nervous condition of its soldiers. Despite the notion of hysterical soldiers clashing with nationalist and revanchist ideas of the time, diagnoses of hysteria were soon made by military medical personnel. Male "traumatic hysteria", as defined by Charcot, was a distinct disease from female hysteria in that it was linked to traumatic shock rather than sexuality or emotional distress, so the gendered stereotyping was still at work to an extent in Charcot's thinking. This new category subsumed what British and American physicians had understood as railway spine.

From Paris, Charcot's theories traveled east, carried by visitors to Charcot's hospital: the Germans Max Nonne and Hermann Oppenheim, and the Austrian Sigmund Freud. Nonne was originally skeptical, but ultimately became a proponent of the male hysteria diagnosis when dealing with the neurotics produced by the First World War. Oppenheim, on the other hand, was critical of Charcot's theories and sought to distinguish "traumatic hysteria" from "traumatic neurosis"; he and his colleague Thomsen found that the symptoms in their cases of railway spine were different enough from what was regarded as the symptoms of hysteria, at least in severity.

Freud, in 1886, gave a paper about the topic of male hysteria to the Imperial Society of Physicians in Vienna. By this point, the incidence of "classical" hysteria in males was accepted by Freud's audience, but Charcot's traumatic variant was still controversial and evoked discussion among the present medical doctors. In later works, Freud would reject Charcot's distinction between the two types of hysteria, arguing that trauma is the cause of hysteria in both men and women, though he broadened the definition of trauma to include repressed memories of sexual experiences, and believed that recalling traumatic memories could cure hysteria. Freud even diagnosed himself and his brother with hysteria, recounting how he faced opposition (and, supposedly, ostracization) from Vienna's doctors, that followed a gendered view of hysteria, mostly based on etymologism. His followers would exhibit a gendered view of hysteria, associating it with latent homosexuality and the Oedipus complex.

In Britain, Charcot's theories took on a different guise when it was suggested that hysteria in men was a disease of the "Latin races", to which Anglo-Saxon men were virtually immune. In Germany, too, a majority of the medical profession rejected Charcot's ideas, and medical journals circulated papers that labeled French men as more prone to hysteria than Teutons – "which, in the context of the time, meant that they were weaker, less virile, and more susceptible to degeneration". An 1889 case study of hysteria in a German soldier gave the French doctors the ammunition they needed for a counterattack. Aside from French and Germans, indigenous inhabitants of various remote regions, colonial populations, Jews and (retroactively) pre-Civil War American slaves were charged with high incidence rates of hysteria by European and white American doctors and anthropologists.

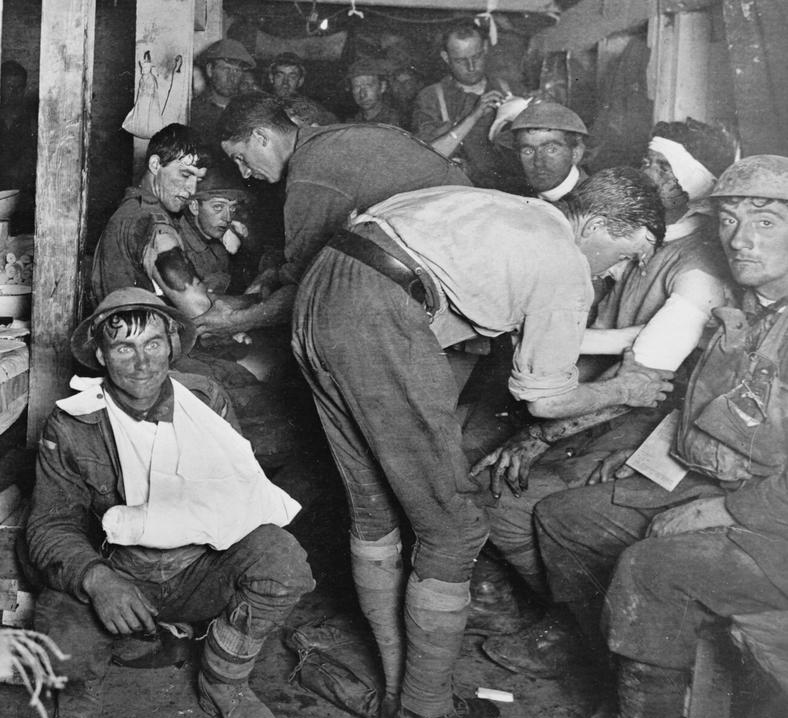
Ypres, 1917. In the lower left, a shell-shock sufferer.

Toward the end of the century, female hysteria became increasingly an anti-suffragist label in the popular press and came under attack from rising feminism, while the wars of the early twentieth century brought new attention to the male variant. The Boer War and the Russo-Japanese War produced hysterical symptoms in veterans in large enough numbers that in 1907 the label "war neurosis" was introduced to describe their specific condition. For the disorders seen in World War I veterans, additional terms such as shell-shock (coined by Charles Samuel Myers), and (in France) pthiatiques and simulateurs were invented to prevent labeling soldiers with the "feminizing" label of hysteria. Charcot's earlier work, meanwhile, was ignored, and shell-shock sufferers were regarded by their physicians as displaying the symptoms of "womanish, homosexual or childish impulses".

== Shell shock and war neurosis ==
Shell shock or war neurosis are forms of hysteria that manifested in soldiers during war time, especially World War I. Symptoms that were previously considered somatic were reconsidered in a new light; trembling, paralysis, nightmares, mutism and apathy were grouped together in a broad spectrum psychological disorder known as "war neurosis".

By 1916 40% of casualties in fighting areas were diagnosed with shell shock. As a consequence twenty more military hospitals were established specifically to treat these sufferers. The physical and emotional symptoms of war neurosis varies based on the military rank of the sufferer. However, sexual impotence stemming from a sense of powerlessness was common to all. Some of the physical symptoms displayed by low ranking officers were:

- paralyses and limps
- blindness
- deafness
- mutism (most common)
- limb contractures
- vomiting

The symptoms displaying by ranking officers were more emotional/psychological in comparison to their soldiers:

- nightmares
- insomnia
- fatigue
- dizziness and disorientation
- anxiety attacks

World War I was the first instance in which a war neurosis and mental trauma was rampant and affected soldiers considerably. This could be attributed to the particular form of fighting – trench warfare – which was impersonal and constantly kept the soldier on edge for the next attack. Eric Leed writes that war neurosis was a result of the breakdown of the previously personal relationship of the soldier and his means of fighting. Rivers considered the idea that the traumatized men resorted to neurotic behavior because of a loss of their usual defense mechanism – physical hand-to-hand combat.

It was especially difficult for officers to maintain British ideals of masculinity. They were expected to be perfectly dressed, always motivated, and have a hunger for enemy blood, even though they were just as afraid and disillusioned as their soldiers. It does not come as surprise that war neurosis occurred four times more in officers than ordinary soldiers. Showalter argues that mental breakdowns of soldiers during the war was a form of protest against pre-conceived notions of Edwardian manliness that demand unifying patriotism and stoic lack of emotion.

Treatment also depended on rank. Soldiers had to undergo disciplinary, quick treatments while officers had the luxury of psychotherapy.

== Important physicians ==
=== Jean-Martin Charcot ===
Charcot was born in 1825 and received his M.D. from the University of Paris in 1853. He was appointed as associate professor of medicine in 1860, followed by a position of Head of Hospital Service at Salpêtrière in 1862. Charcot published over sixty case reports of hysteria in boys and young men between 1878 and 1893. He was dedicated to breaking the stereotype that hysteria manifested in wealthy or homosexual men, and insisted that it occurred in manual laborers as well. He was of the belief that the physical signs and symptoms of hysteria were identical in both sexes but claimed that the condition presented itself differently in the minds of men and women. Most noticeable was that he did not attribute sexual factors to the conditions of his male patients. He was thus able to diagnose men with hysteria because he kept away from theoretically controversial issues such as sexuality.

=== W.H.R. Rivers ===
Rivers was a Royal Army Military Corps physician who was the first Englishman to support Sigmund Freud's work in psychoanalytic theory, and went on to pioneer the British Psychoanalytic Society after the war. He was a supporter of the "talking cure". Rivers' treatment drew heavily from Freud's 'talking cure', because he focused primarily on discussing hidden memories of trauma and dissecting war nightmares. Siegfried Sassoon records that he would record his dreams to be dissected by Rivers. Both Freud and Rivers were united in their conviction that addressing traumatic memories was the only way to give full recovery.

==== Relationship with Siegfried Sassoon ====
Sassoon was diagnosed with war neurosis by the military review board following a dramatic anti-war declaration in May 1917. He was ordered to receive treatment at Craiglockheart War Hospital headed by Rivers. It is difficult to tell of Sassoon was truly suffering from war neurosis. Rivers diagnosed him as having a "strong anti-war complex", and thus Rivers set about trying to convince Sassoon to rejoin battle by hinting that pacifism was unpatriotic. Sassoon's interactions with Rivers along with his poetry hinted at a possible homoerotic element in the physician-patient relationship.

==== Craiglockheart War Hospital ====
Craiglockheart was the birthplace of innovation in psychoanalytic therapy as evidenced by Rivers' work. Unlike other shell shock hospitals of the time, Craiglockheart allowed officers to engage in therapeutic hobbies such as writing, sports and photography. The hospital magazine, Hydra was a wonderful insight into the minds of lower-ranked officers, physicians and nurses alike – "Within its pages are a series of fascinating and revealing cartoons depicting, among other things, the traumatic nightmares most of those at the hydro suffered, Rivers' mystical reputation, and the often mixed feelings of soldiers on leaving the place". The most famous anti-war poem, Dulce et decorum est, was written at the hospital in 1917 by a renowned poet and war neurosis sufferer, Wilfred Owen.

=== Lewis Yealland ===
A Canadian-born medic, Yealland was an aggressive supporter of disciplinary treatment for war neurosis. He worked in Queen's Square during the war and to has been established that he and other medics tortured patients into recovery. He was among the first British physicians to use electric shock treatment and has been criticized heavily for doing so. In Yealland's view, patients were more amenable to the suggestion that they suffered from a physiological disturbance that could be potentially remedied by a physical treatment such as faradism.

== Representations in popular culture ==
=== Regeneration by Pat Barker ===
Regeneration (1991) is the first of a series of novels that deals with the psychological trauma caused by World War I on English officers who fought on the front lines. The plot revolves around the character of Siegfried Sassoon, a decorated officer who is sent to Craiglockhart War Hospital in Edinburgh because he is said to be suffering from "Shell Shock".

=== Redeployment by Phil Klay ===
Phil Klay is a graduate of Dartmouth College and a veteran of the U.S. Marine Corps. He served in Iraq's Anbar Province from January 2007 to February 2008 as a Public Affairs Officer. Redeployment (2014) is a collection of short stories that transports the readers into the minds of the soldiers in Afghanistan as well as those who have recently returned from the frontline. The book shows the struggle of its characters as they grapple with guilt, hopeless and fear as they try to rationalize life on the front lines and back home.

== See also ==
- Female hysteria
- Histrionic personality disorder
- Vapours (disease)
