= William Meredith =

William Meredith may refer to:

- William Meredith (MP), MP for Wootton Bassett
- Billy Meredith (1874–1958), Welsh international winger, oft described as "football's first superstar"
- William Morris Meredith Jr. (1919–2007), American poet and Pulitzer Prize laureate
- William Collis Meredith (1812–1894), Canadian jurist, Chief Justice of Quebec Superior Court
- William Morton Meredith (1835–1917), American director of the Bureau of Engraving and Printing
- William Meredith (surgeon) (1848–1916), American surgeon who practiced in Briton
- William Ralph Meredith (1840–1923), Canadian politician
- William M. Meredith (1799–1873), American lawyer, politician, and U.S. Treasury Secretary
- Sir William Meredith, 3rd Baronet (1725–1790), British politician
- William Meredith (American football) (died 1959), football coach
