= Marcus Beck =

British professor of surgery (1843–1893)

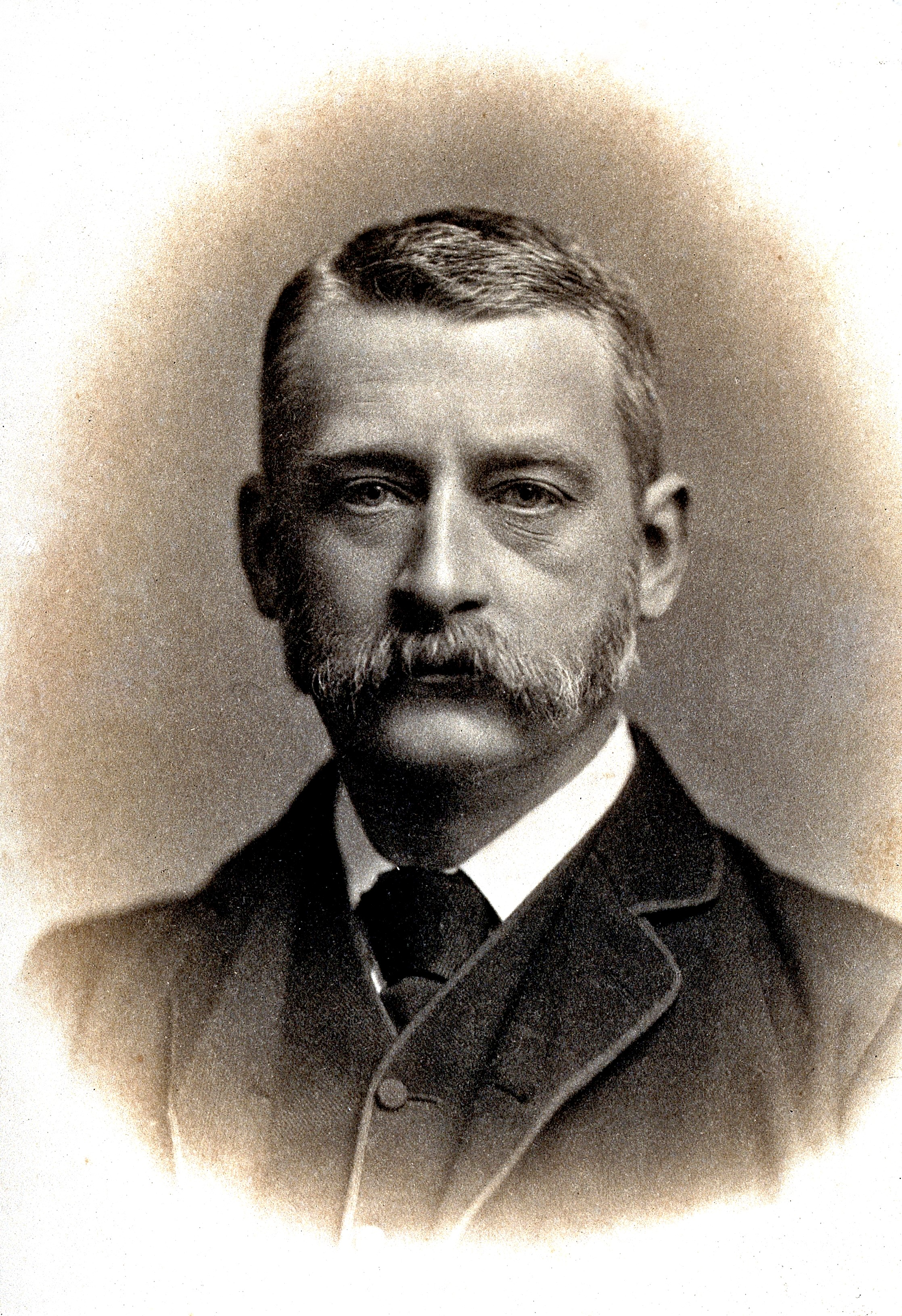
- Born: 14 October 1843; Isleworth, Middlesex, England
- Died: 21 May 1893 (aged 49)
- Burial place: Society of Friends burial ground, Brentford End
- Monuments: Marcus Beck Library
- Education: Queenwood College; Arthur Abbott School; University of Glasgow
- Occupation: Professor of surgery
- Notable work: Report on Pyaemia, 1879; The Science and Art of Surgery, 1853

Marcus Beck (14 October 1843 – 21 May 1893) was a British professor of surgery at University College Hospital. He was an early proponent of the germ theory of disease and promoted the discoveries of Louis Pasteur, Robert Koch, and Joseph Lister in surgical literature of the time. He gave his name to the Marcus Beck Library (previously Laboratory) at the Royal Society of Medicine (RSM).

== Early life ==
Beck was born on 14 October 1843 in Isleworth, Middlesex, to Quakers Edward Beck and his second wife Susanna Lucas. They had eight children, of which Roger was the first son; Roger later funded a memorial in the name of the third son, Marcus. Beck also had three sisters. Edward Beck was a cousin of Joseph, Lord Lister who later proved to be influential on Marcus. Beck was educated at Queenwood College, Hampshire, Arthur Abbott's School, Hitchin and the University of Glasgow.

== Surgical career ==
Beck gained admission to the University of Glasgow in 1860 where he lived with Joseph Lister, his first cousin once removed. In 1863, he became house surgeon to Sir John Eric Erichsen at University College Hospital, London, and then physician's assistant to Sir William Jenner, 1st Baronet and Dr C J Hare, following which he became an anatomy demonstrator under professor Viner Ellis. The University College Hospital Reports published Beck's clinical cases in 1870, whilst he was still a registrar and the surgical pathological specimens were exhibited in the museum of University College.

Beck became assistant surgeon to University College Hospital in 1873, succeeding Christopher Heath (surgeon) as teacher of operative surgery in 1875. Becoming professor of clinical surgery in 1883, he was elected surgeon to the hospital and professor of surgery in succession to John Marshall by 1885. The Royal College of Surgeons, by 1890, had elected him to their council. In 1892, Beck became a member of the court of examiners, by which time he was practising at 30 Wimpole Street.

Distinguished surgeons who trained under Beck include William Meredith, Stanley Boyd, Victor Horsley, and Raymond Johnson.

== Beck and Lister ==
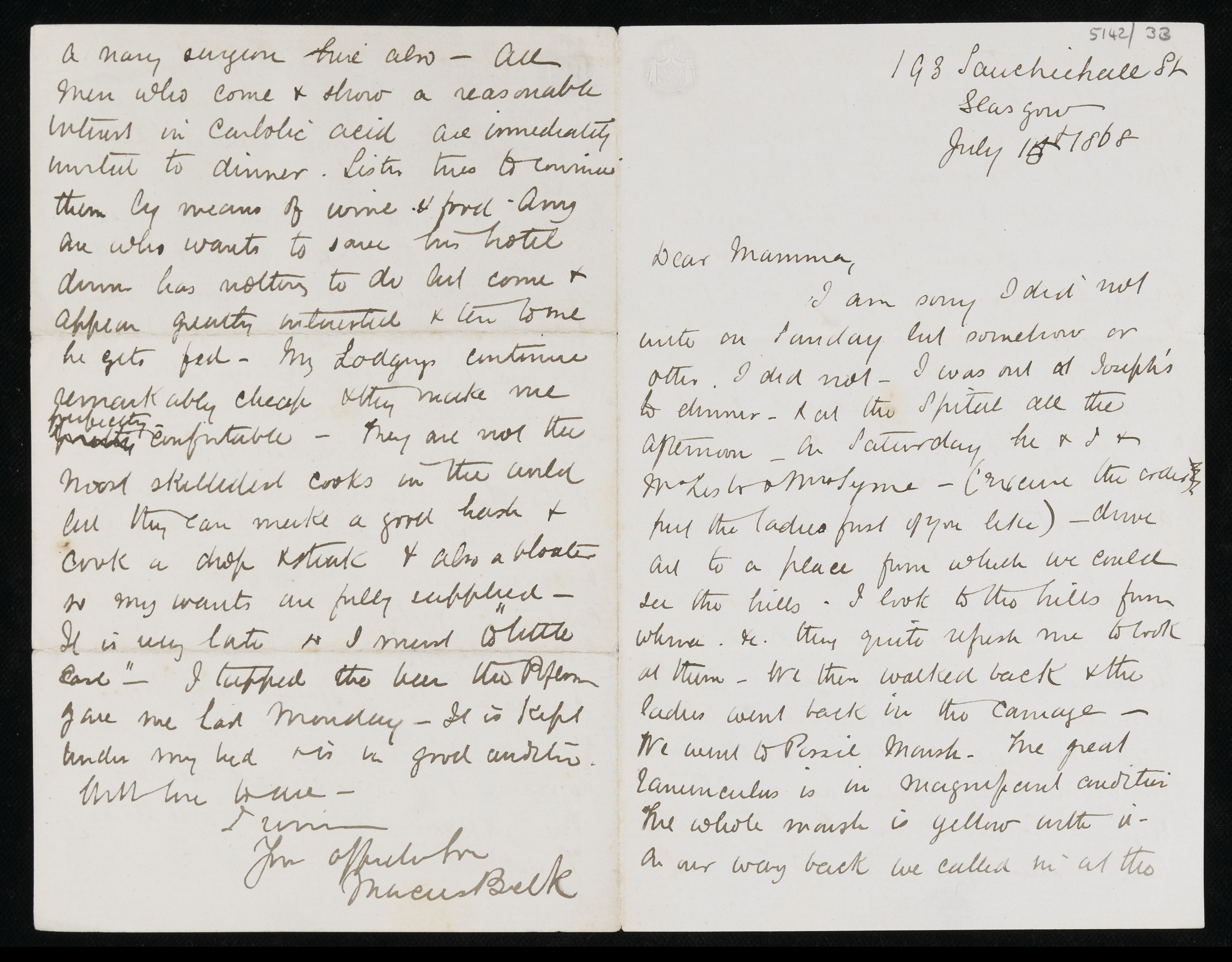
First and last page of a letter from Marcus Beck concerning time with Lister, 1868.

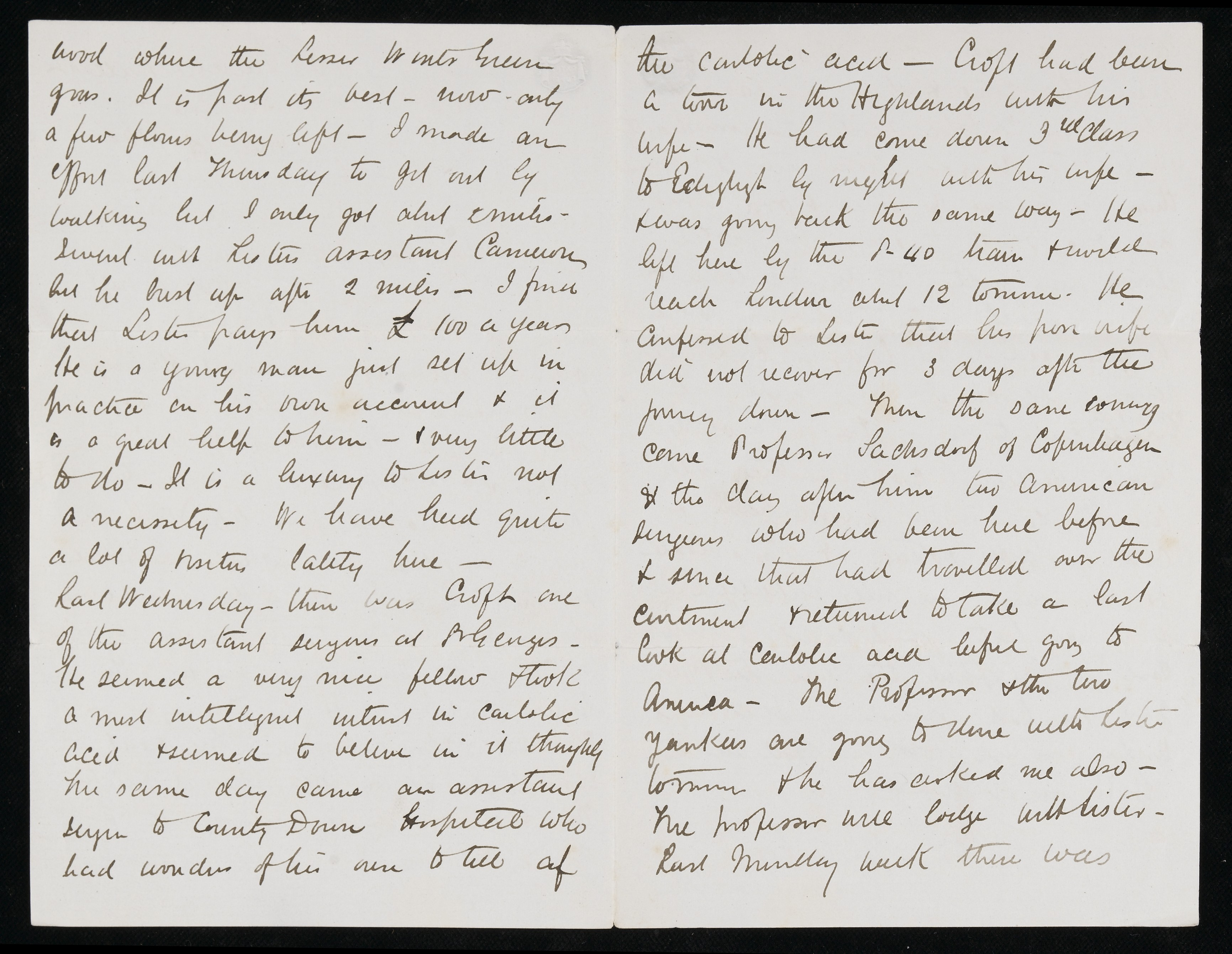
Second and third page of a letter from Marcus Beck concerning time with Lister, 1868.

Joseph Lister was the cousin of Beck's father Edward. Lister was also professor of surgery at Glasgow and became host to Beck during his three-year medical studies. Living in the Lister household created a close bond as they carried out animal experiments together. The introduction of the antiseptic technique by Lister in the late 19th century was controversial and Beck was one of his greatest defenders.

Beck was also a close associate of Erichsen, who had published a popular and reputable surgical textbook, The Science and Art of Surgery which in 1860, was issued by the American government to every medical officer in the Federal army during the American Civil War. Beck had reported in 1870, that the French failed to adopt antiseptic measures during the Franco-Prussian War. Besides Howse at Guy's Hospital, Beck was among the few that understood or practised Lister's methods until Lister came to London. By 1888, Beck, in an attempt to bring Listerian surgery up to date, had skilfully included Lister's antiseptic techniques and the theories of Pasteur and Koch into the eighth and ninth editions of this book. This was considered a significant contribution to surgical literature and was translated into German and Russian.

== Publications ==
- 1879 – joint author of the Report on Pyoemia.
- "Descriptive Catalogue of Specimens Illustrating Surgical Pathology in the Museum of University College Hospital, London." 1887.
- "Galvano-puncture of Aortic Aneurysm." – Lancet, 1873.
- "Three Cases of Trephining for Haemorrhage from the Middle Meningeal Artery." – Med. Times and Gaz., 1877.
- "Case of Nephrolithotomy." – Trans. Clin. Soc., 1882.
- The Science and Art of Surgery, by John Eric Erichsen, 8th edition revised and edited by Marcus Beck. 2 vols., 1884, and 9th edition, 1888.

Beck contributed to articles on "Diseases of the Kidney and Secondary Affections of the Lower Urinary Tract, misnamed Surgical Kidney" to Volume V of Reynold's System of Medicine. He also wrote on erysipelas for the first edition of Quain's Dictionary of Medicine, and on "Diseases of the Breast" for Heath's Dictionary of Surgery.

Beck was elected a member of the Morbid Growths Committee of the Pathological Society.

== Marcus Beck Laboratory ==
Beck's older brother, Roger Beck, donated £500 to the RSM building fund following Beck's death from complications of diabetes mellitus at age 49. In his memory, the formation of a laboratory was supported by the society's president, Sir Henry Morris, 1st Baronet. The laboratory, 1912 to 1924, was a focus of research for Sir Ronald Ross and the Medical Research Council (United Kingdom). In the later years of World War I, it was used for National Service Medical Boards. The Marcus Beck laboratory, initially prepared specimens for demonstration at the society's meetings and later conducted research on behalf of the Medical Research Council. Supervised by Ross, research concentrated on measles and dysentery before being superseded by expanding London teaching hospital laboratories. In 1913, Ross recommended that government put some funds from the National Insurance Fund surplus into research carried out at the Marcus Beck laboratory. Friction was apparent between Ross and the RSM as other researchers wanted to use to use the laboratory. Ross was known to refuse on account of overcrowding. He is also noted to have been eventually pleased with others' work as was the case with Dr A.J. Venn who was granted permission to unpaid work on measles in the laboratory by John MacAlister. Other work in the laboratory included research into malaria (1913–17) and animal experiments. In 1916, annual inspections found animal cages amongst the book stacks. The library committee was reported to have not been amused.

== Marcus Beck Library ==
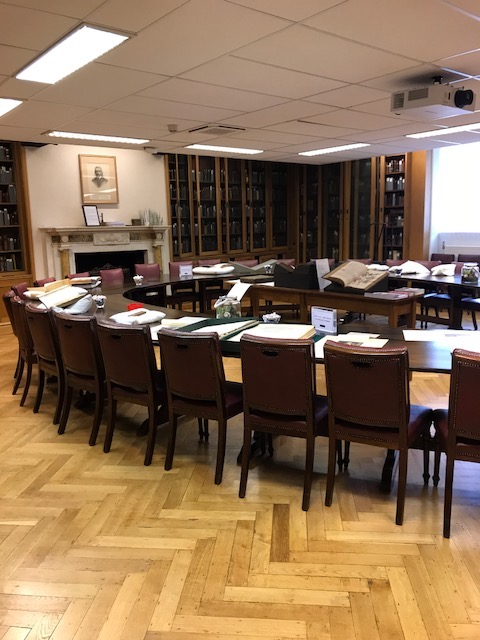
Marcus Beck Library at the Royal Society of Medicine

Roger Beck gave permission to the Royal Society of Medicine's council to form an extension of the library from the laboratory in 1923. A prerequisite was that this library continue to be associated with Marcus Beck. The Medical Research Council acquired the no longer needed medical equipment and the Honorary librarian took over responsibility for the new extended library. Medical portraits and engravings, as well as the society's old and rare books and manuscripts, were housed in this library. The room continues to be used as a council meeting room and a portrait of Beck hangs over the fireplace.

== Later life ==
Beck died at Isleworth on 21 May 1893, having had diabetes for 20 years.
