= Hysteria =

Excess, ungovernable emotion

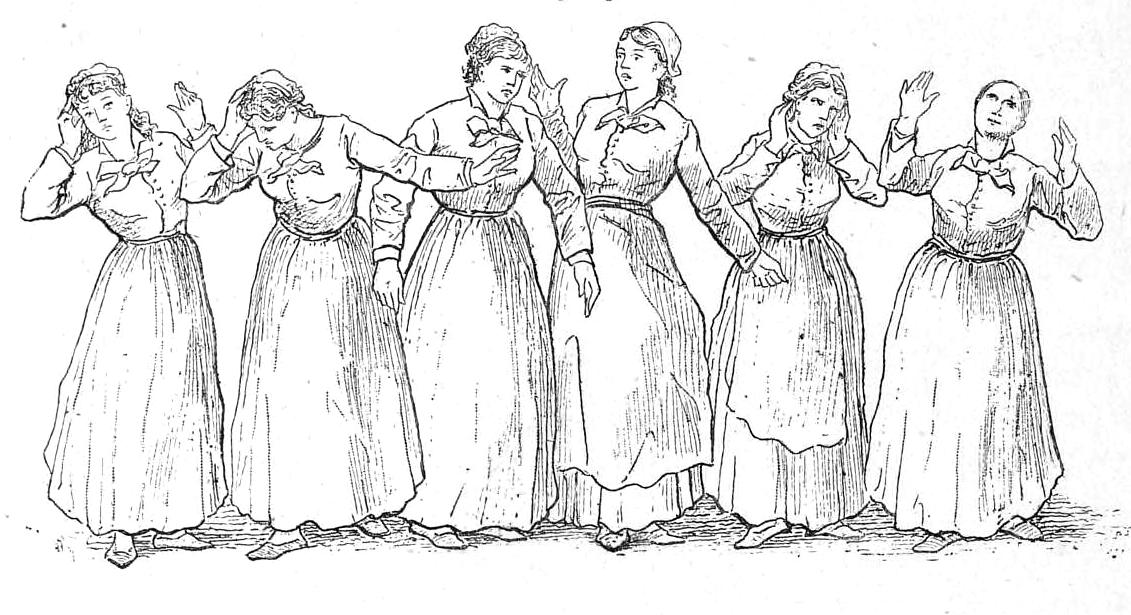
An 1893 depiction of a woman with hysteria

Hysteria is a term used to mean ungovernable emotional excess and can refer to a temporary state of mind or emotion. In the 19th century, female hysteria was considered a diagnosable physical illness in women. It is assumed that the basis for diagnosis operated under the belief that women are predisposed to mental and behavioral conditions; an interpretation of sex-related differences in stress responses. In the 20th century, it shifted to being considered a mental illness. Influential physicians the likes of Sigmund Freud and Jean-Martin Charcot had dedicated research to hysteria patients.

Currently, most physicians do not accept hysteria as a medical diagnosis. Today, psychiatrists may use the term to refer to behavior in which patients "imitate physical or psychological disorders of a kind that draws medical and nursing attention to them", usually as a self-deception rather than an attempt to defraud. The blanket diagnosis of hysteria has been fragmented into myriad medical categories such as epilepsy, histrionic personality disorder, conversion disorders, dissociative disorders, or other medical conditions. Furthermore, lifestyle choices, such as choosing not to wed, are no longer considered symptoms of psychological disorders such as hysteria.

== History ==
The word hysteria originates from the Ancient Greek word for uterus, ὑστέρα (hystera). The oldest record of hysteria dates back to 1900 BCE when Egyptians recorded behavioral abnormalities in adult women on the Kahun Papyrus. The Egyptians attributed the behavioral disturbances to a wandering uterus – thus the condition later being dubbed hysteria. To treat hysteria Egyptian doctors prescribed various medications. For example, doctors put strong-smelling substances on the patients' vulvas to encourage the uterus to return to its proper position. Another tactic was to smell or swallow unsavory herbs to encourage the uterus to flee back to the lower part of the female's abdomen.

The ancient Greeks accepted the ancient Egyptians' explanation for hysteria; however, they included in their definition of hysteria the inability to bear children or the unwillingness to marry. Plato and Aristotle expressed ideas that can retroactively be classified as hysteria. In Plato's Timaeus, Timaeus tells a likely story about the universe (a myth) which includes an account of something akin to hysteria as a condition in which the womb, remaining barren beyond its natural time, becomes distressed and wanders throughout the body, obstructing passages and causing suffocation and various diseases. In the 5th century BCE Hippocrates first used the term hysteria. Ancient Romans also attributed hysteria to an abnormality in the womb; however, discarded the traditional explanation of a wandering uterus. Instead, the ancient Romans credited hysteria to a disease of the womb or a disruption in reproduction (i.e., a miscarriage, menopause, etc.). Hysteria theories from the ancient Egyptians, ancient Greeks, and ancient Romans were the basis of the Western understanding of hysteria.

Between the 5th and 13th centuries, however, the increasing influence of Christianity in the Latin West altered medical and public understanding of hysteria. St. Augustine's writings suggested that human suffering resulted from sin, thus hysteria became perceived as satanic possession. With the shift in perception of hysteria came a shift in treatment options. The Church treated affected patients through prayers, amulets, and exorcisms. At this time, writings such as Constantine the African's Viaticum and Pantegni, described women with hysteria as the cause of amor heroycus, a form of sexual desire so strong that it caused madness, rather than someone with a problem who should be cured.

Trota de Ruggiero is considered the first female doctor in Christian Europe as well as the first gynecologist, though she could not become a magister. She recognized that women were often ashamed to go to a doctor with gynecological issues, and studied women's diseases. She prescribed remedies such as mint for women suffering from hysteria. Hildegard of Bingen was another female doctor whose work was part of an attempt to combine science and faith. She agreed with the theories of Hippocrates and suggested hysteria may be connected to the idea of original sin; she believed that men and women were both responsible for original sin, and could both suffer from hysteria. Furthermore, during the Renaissance period many patients of hysteria were prosecuted as witches and underwent interrogations, torture, exorcisms, and execution. During this time the common point of view was that women were inferior beings, connected to Aristotle's ideas of male superiority. Saint Thomas Aquinas supported this idea and stated in Summa Theologica that "'some old women' are evil-minded; they gaze on children in a poisonous and evil way, and demons, with whom the witches enter into agreements, interacting through their eyes". This type of fear of witches and sorcery is part of the rules of celibacy and chastity imposed on the clergy. Philippe Pinel believed that there was little difference between madness and healthy people, and believed that people should be treated if they were unwell. He considered hysteria a female disorder.

However, during the 16th and 17th centuries activists and scholars worked to change the perception of hysteria back to a medical condition. Particularly, French physician Charles Le Pois insisted that hysteria was a malady of the brain. In addition, in 1697, English physician Thomas Sydenham theorized that hysteria was an emotional condition, instead of a physical condition. Many physicians followed Lepois and Sydenham's lead and hysteria became disassociated from the soul and the womb. During this time period, science started to focalize hysteria in the central nervous system. As doctors developed a greater understanding of the human nervous system, the neurological model of hysteria was created, which further propelled the conception of hysteria as a mental disorder. Joseph Raulin published a work in 1748 which associated hysteria with the air quality in cities. He suggested that men and women could both have hysteria, but women were more likely to have it due to laziness.

In 1859 Paul Briquet defined hysteria as a chronic syndrome manifesting in many unexplained symptoms throughout the body's organ systems. What Briquet described became known as Briquet's syndrome, or Somatization disorders, in 1971. Over a 10-year period, Briquet conducted 430 case studies of patients with hysteria. Following Briquet, Jean-Martin Charcot studied women in an asylum in France and used hypnosis as treatment. Charcot detailed the intricacies of hysteria, understanding it as being caused by patriarchy. He also mentored Pierre Janet, another French psychologist, who studied five of hysteria's symptoms (anaesthesia, amnesia, abulia, motor control diseases, and character change) in depth and proposed that hysteria symptoms occurred due to a lapse in consciousness. Both Charcot and Janet inspired Freud's work. Freud theorized hysteria stemmed from childhood sexual abuse or repression. Briquet, Freud and Charcot noted male hysteria; both genders could exhibit the syndrome. Hysterics may be able to manipulate their caretakers, thus complicating treatment.

L.E. Emerson was a Freudian who worked at the Boston Psychopathic Hospital and saw hysteric patients. Investigating the files, Elizabeth Lunbeck found that most hysteric patients at this hospital were single, either because of their young age or because they purposefully avoided men due to past sexual abuse. Emerson was interested in the stories his patients told and published multiple case studies where he related their stories to sex and their inner sexual conflicts. Emerson stated that their hysteria, which ranged from self-harm to immense guilt for what happened, was due to the patients' traumas or a lack of sexual knowledge, to which he stated that they were sexually repressed.

During the 20th century, as psychiatry advanced in the West, anxiety and depression diagnoses began to replace hysteria diagnoses in Western countries. For example, from 1949 to 1978, annual admissions of hysteria patients in England and Wales decreased by roughly two-thirds. With the decrease of hysteria patients in Western cultures came an increase in anxiety and depression patients. Theories for why hysteria diagnoses began to decline vary, but many historians infer that World War II, along with the use of the diagnosis of shell-shock, westernization, and migration shifted Western mental health expectations. Twentieth-century Western societies expected depression and anxiety manifest itself more in post World War II generations and displaced individuals; and thus, individuals were reported or diagnosed accordingly. In addition, medical advancements explained ailments that were previously attributed to hysteria such as epilepsy or infertility. World Wars caused military doctors to become focused on hysteria as during this time there seemed to be a rise in cases, especially under instances of high stress. In 1919 Arthur Frederick Hurst wrote that "many cases of gross hysterical symptoms occurred in soldiers who had no family or personal history of neuroses, and who were perfectly fit". In 1970 Colin P. McEvedy and Alanson W. Beard suggested that Royal Free Disease (Royal Free Hospital outbreak, now also known as myalgic encephalomyelitis/chronic fatigue syndrome, a neurological disease), which mainly affected young women, was an epidemic of hysteria. They also said that hysteria had a historically negative connotation, however that should not prevent doctors from assessing symptoms of the patient. In 1980, after a gradual decline in diagnoses and reports, hysteria was removed from the American Psychiatric Association's Diagnostic and Statistical Manual of Mental Disorders (DSM), which had included hysteria as a mental disorder from its second publication in 1968.

The term is still used in the 21st century, though not as a diagnosis. When used, it is often a general term for any dramatic displays of outrage or emotion.

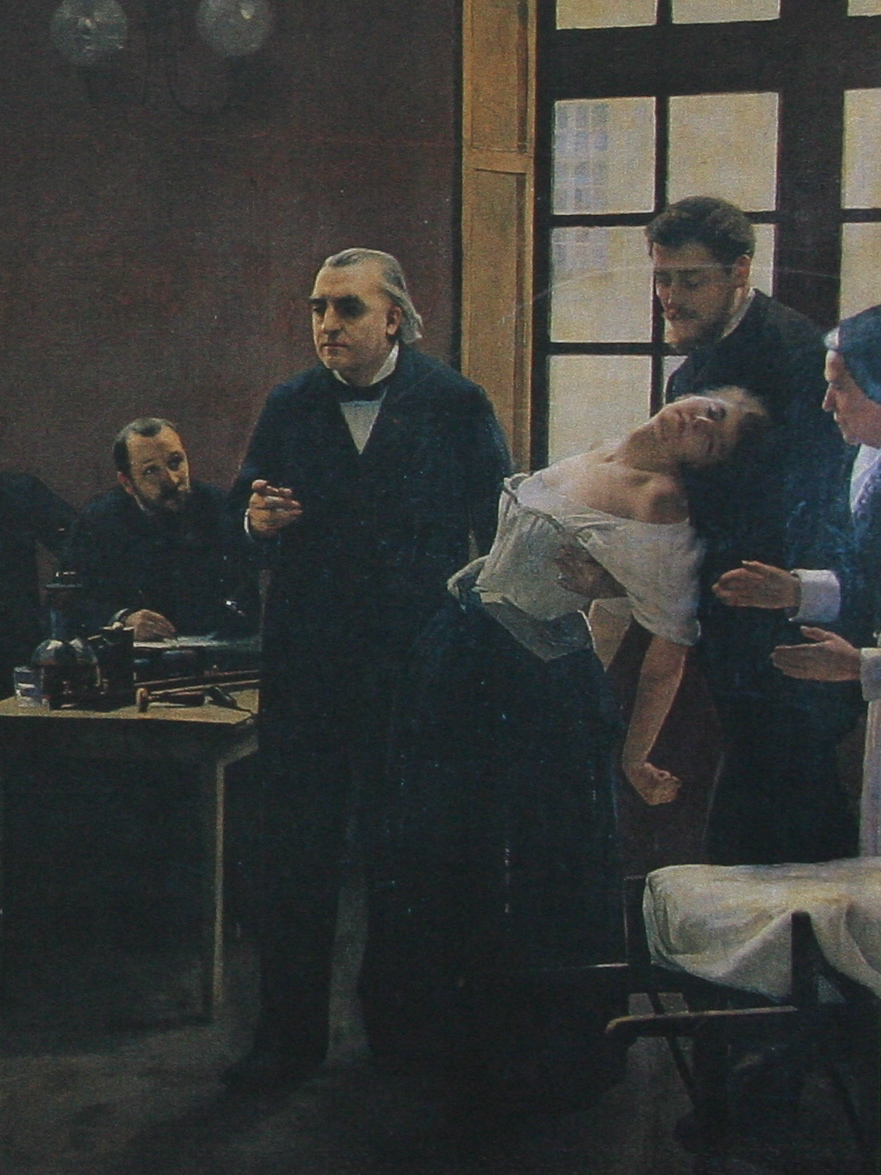
André Brouillet: A Clinical Lesson at the Salpêtrière

== Historical symptoms ==
Historically, the symptoms of hysteria have a large range.

- Shortness of breath
- Anxiety
- Insomnia
- Fainting
- Amnesia
- Paralysis
- Pain
- Spasms
- Convulsive fits
- Vomiting
- Deafness
- Bizarre movements
- Seizures
- Hallucinations
- Inability to speak
- Infertility

== Historical treatment ==
- Regular marital sex
- Pregnancy
- Childbirth
- Rest cure
- Barbiturates

== Notable theorists ==
=== Charcot ===
In the late 19th century, French neurologist Jean-Martin Charcot tackled what he referred to as "the great neurosis" or hysteria. Charcot theorized that hysteria was a hereditary, physiological disorder. He believed hysteria impaired areas of the brain which provoked the physical symptoms displayed in each patient. While Charcot believed hysteria was hereditary, he also thought that environmental factors such as stress could trigger hysteria in an individual.

Charcot published more than 120 case studies of patients who he diagnosed with hysteria, including Marie Wittman. Whittman was referred to as the "Queen of Hysterics", and remains the most famous patient of hysteria. To treat his patients, Charcot used hypnosis, which he determined was successful only when used on hysterics. Using patients as props, Charcot executed dramatic public demonstrations of hysterical patients and his cures for hysteria, which many suggest produced the hysterical phenomenon. Furthermore, Charcot noted similarities between demon possession and hysteria, and thus, he concluded "demonomania" was a form of hysteria.

The historical novel The Madwomen of Paris (2024) by Jennifer Cody Epstein writes about the experiences of several women diagnosed with hysteria at the Salpêtrière Hospital, and explores the controversial use of hypnosis and public demonstrations under Charcot's care.

=== Freud ===
In 1896 Sigmund Freud, an Austrian psychoanalyst, published "The Aetiology of Hysteria". The paper explains how Freud believes his female patients' neurosis, which he labels hysteria, resulted from sexual abuse as children. Freud named the concept of physical symptoms resulting from childhood trauma: hysterical conversion. Freud hypothesized that in order to cure hysteria the patient must relive the experiences through imagination in the most vivid form while under light hypnosis. Freud later adapted this, realizing that sexual abuse must not be the only way of developing neuroses. He then theorized that, in addition to abuse, fantasies of sexual abuse could be responsible, though he never ruled out that sexual abuse could be the cause of illness, simply not the only possible cause. Freud was also one of the first noted psychiatrists to attribute hysteria to men. He diagnosed himself with hysteria, writing that he feared his work had exacerbated his condition.

== Modern perceptions ==
For the most part, hysteria does not exist as a medical diagnosis in Western culture and has been replaced by other diagnoses such as conversion or functional disorders. The effects of hysteria as a diagnosable illness in the 18th and 19th centuries has had a lasting effect on the medical treatment of women's health. The term hysterical, applied to an individual, can mean that they are emotional, irrationally upset, or frenzied. When applied to a situation not involving panic, hysteria means that that situation is uncontrollably amusing – the connotation being that it invokes hysterical laughter.

Today, psychiatrists may use the term hysteria to refer to "human behavior in which the subjects act in ways that imitate physical or psychological disorders of a kind that draws medical and nursing attention to them". According to McHugh, psychiatrists maintain that hysteria (or "medically imitative behavioral displays") are a "vivid form of self-deception rather than a swindle".

== See also ==
- Body-centred countertransference
- Borderline personality disorder
- Fainting room
- Female hysteria
- Histrionic personality disorder
- Hysterical contagion
- Male hysteria
- Panic attack
- Paranoia
- Post-traumatic stress disorder
- Scotomization
- Somatization disorder
- Wandering womb
