= Paul Briquet =

French physician and psychologist (1795 to 1881)

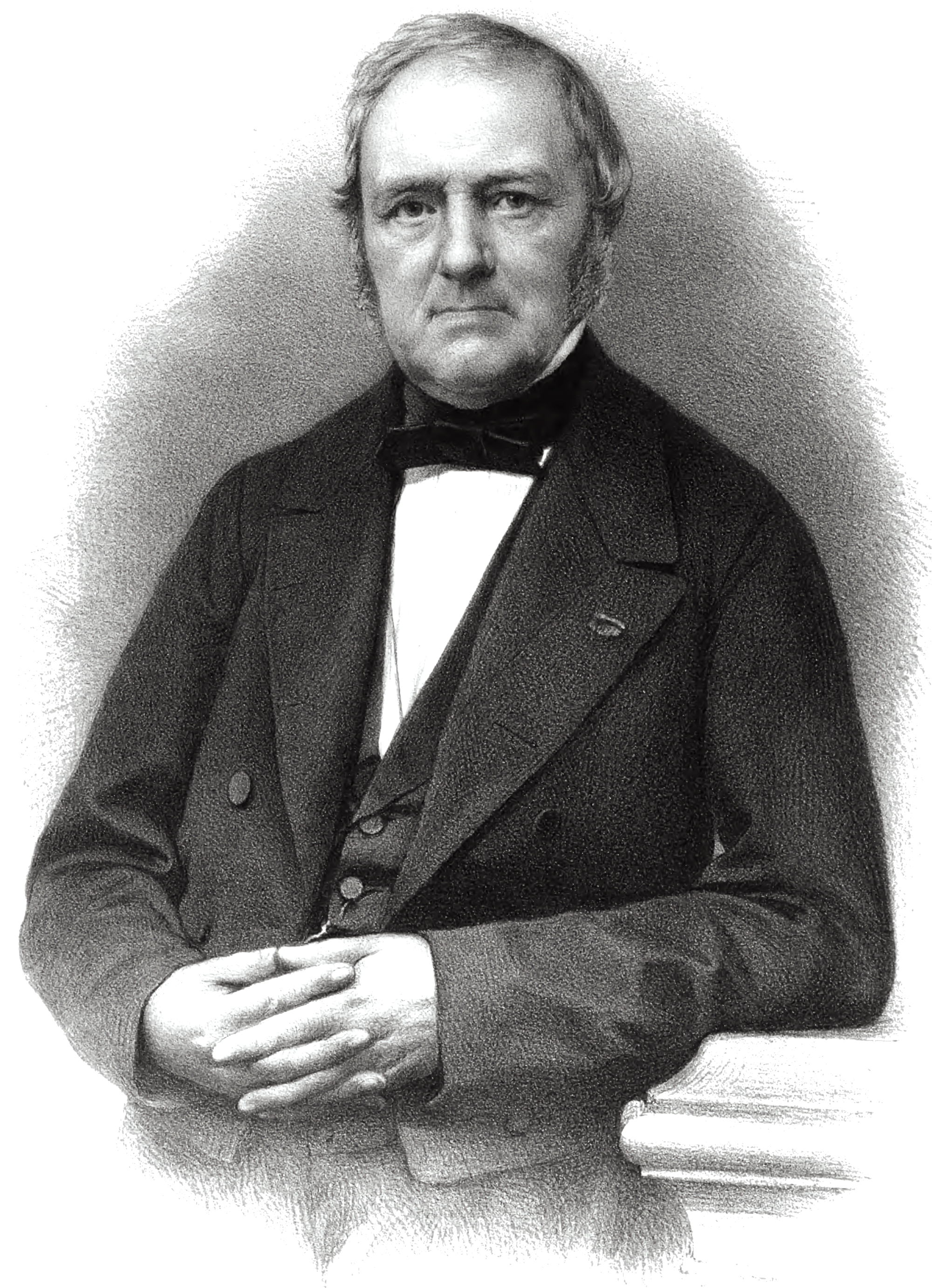
- Born: January 12, 1796; Chalon-en-Champagne
- Died: November 25, 1881; Paris

Paul Briquet or Pierre Briquet (12 January 1796 – 25 November 1881) was a French medical doctor and psychologist who advanced the reasoned treatment of disturbed people said to be hysterics.

Briquet became a medical doctor in 1824, a professor in 1827. In 1836 he operated at the Cochin hospital and in 1846 at La Charité hospital. In 1853 he described the preparation and use of quinine.

He published Traité clinique et thérapeutique de l’Hystérie in 1859, and the following year he was admitted to the Academie de Medecine.

A type of disorder called "Briquet’s syndrome" is classified as a subset of somatic symptom disorder. He first described this in 1859.

Although many of his theoretical concepts and scientific methods reflected the limitations of the period, his work emphasized empirical observation and clinical documentation. His Treatise on Hysteria contributed to early medical discussions of hysteria.

Briquet was a proponent of male hysteria in his Treatise. He cites Louyer-Villermay, M. Dubois, M. Landouzy, and M. Monneret as putting to rest the doubt over male hysteria. He wrote, "Regardless of the denials, men may suffer from hysteria, and the cases that prove it are not rare, and it is only possible to prevent it by acknowledging that." As a mental condition, hysteria is not due to uterine influence: "Hysteria may occur in men, who have no uterus, in non-menstruating young women whose uterus is still in a rudimentary state and where it remains without influence, and in old women where it no longer influences." Briquet describes circumstances where simultaneously the senses are excited, and efforts are made to conceal the excitation, as precursors to hysteria.

In Mark Micale’s reading of Briquet’s Treatise, the introductory section on male hysteria is followed by prejudice against the male victims of the disorder.

Briquet chooses to begin the main body of his book with a 40-page discussion of hysteria in the adult male – the very first discussion of its kind in a nineteenth-century medical text.
By the end of Briquet's long and authoritative exposition, an adult man capable of "affective impressions" is seen as not only sick and abnormal, but also as a deviation from, and menace to, the bourgeois family order.

Apart from the gender factor, Briquet studied the epidemiology of hysteria through 430 patients that he attended over a decade of clinical work. Micale describes the anticipation of affective neuroscience:

[Briquet centers] hysteria in the brain, conjecturing that a part of the human brain is reserved for emotional or "affective sensations", as opposed to motor control and intellectual operations. He then specifies that "hysteria is an illness consisting of a neurosis of the part of the brain destined to receive affective impressions and feelings". He goes on to maintain that the disorder is caused by the complex and highly individual interaction of many disparate factors, including age, gender, emotional disposition, family history, mode of education, previous physical illness and psychological stress. The malady develops temperamentally, he claims, in individuals with an "affective predominance".

In his 2004 history of mental illness, Theodore Millon noted Briquet's advances:

[Briquet] speculated on untoward developmental and life experiences as playing a pathogenic role (e.g. parental mistreatment, spousal abuse, unfavorable employment circumstances, or business failures). Recognizing that only a small subset of those subjected to these psychosocial experiences developed the hysterical syndrome, Briquet proposed predispositions as pathogenic factors. Aware that life circumstances troubled his patients, he suggested that many would benefit by speaking to an empathetic counselor or physician who might serve as a confidant. Briquet showed great sensitivity in going beyond the crude medications of the day to employ a psychotherapeutic approach to his patients' difficulties.
