= Railway spine =

Symptoms of passengers in rail accidents

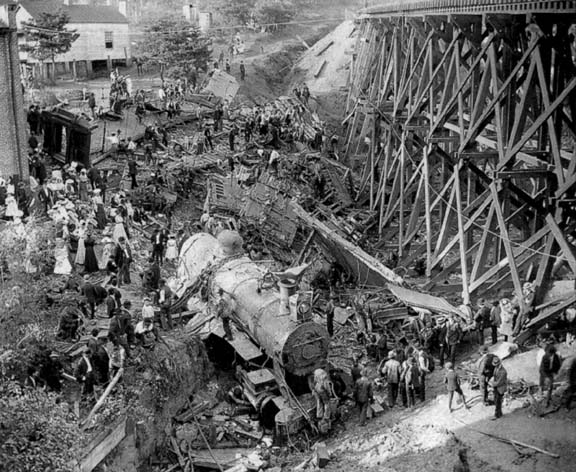

Railway spine was a nineteenth-century diagnosis for the post-traumatic symptoms of passengers involved in railroad accidents.

The first full-length medical study of the condition was John Eric Erichsen's classic book, On Railway and Other Injuries of the Nervous System. For this reason, railway spine is sometimes known as Erichsen's disease.

== History ==
In the 19th century, steam powered rail had become a popular method of transportation. As its usage increased, accidents became commonplace.

Railroad companies denied the existence of Railway Spine, arguing that the injury was fictitious and implying that sufferers were instead suffering from "litigation neurosis".

The nature of symptoms caused by "railway spine" was hotly debated in the late 19th century, notably at the meetings of the (Austrian) Imperial Society of Physicians in Vienna, 1886. Germany's leading neurologist, Hermann Oppenheim, claimed that all railway spine symptoms were due to physical damage to the spine or brain, whereas French and British doctors, notably Jean-Martin Charcot and Herbert Page, insisted that some symptoms could be caused by hysteria.

Erichsen observed that those most likely to be injured in a railway crash were those sitting with their backs to the acceleration. This is the same injury mechanism found in whiplash. As with automobile accidents, railway and airplane accidents are now known to cause Post-traumatic stress disorder (PTSD) and other psychosomatic symptoms in addition to physical trauma.

== See also ==
- History of rail transport
- Whiplash
