= Whiplash (medicine) =

Injuries to the neck

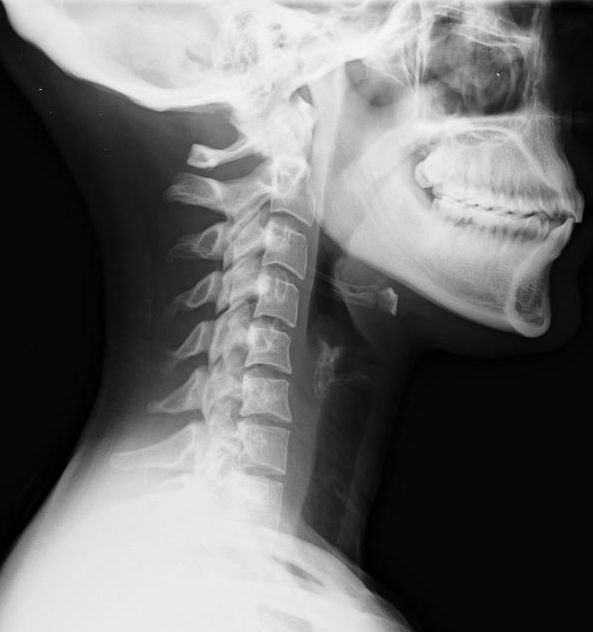
- Lateral view X-ray of whiplash showing a loss of normal lordosis of the cervical vertebrae
- Specialty: Orthopedics, emergency medicine

Whiplash, whose formal term is whiplash associated disorders (WAD), is a range of injuries to the neck caused by or related to a sudden distortion of the neck associated with extension, although the exact injury mechanisms remain unknown. The term "whiplash" is a colloquialism. "Cervical acceleration–deceleration" (CAD) describes the mechanism of the injury, while WAD describes the subsequent injuries and symptoms.

Whiplash is commonly associated with motor vehicle crashes, usually when the vehicle has been hit in the rear; however, the injury can be sustained in many other ways, including headbanging, bungee jumping and falls. It is one of the most frequently claimed injuries on vehicle insurance policies in certain countries; for example, in the United Kingdom, 430,000 people made an insurance claim for whiplash in 2007, accounting for 14% of every driver's premium. In the United States, it is estimated that more than 65% of all bodily injury claims are whiplash related, translating to around $8 billion in economic costs per year.

Before the invention of the car, whiplash injuries were called "railway spine" as they were noted mostly in connection with train collisions. The first case of severe neck pain arising from a train collision was documented around 1919. The number of whiplash injuries has since risen sharply due to rear-end motor vehicle collisions. Given the wide variety of symptoms associated with whiplash injuries, the Quebec Task Force on Whiplash-Associated Disorders coined the phrase 'Whiplash-Associated Disorders'.

While there is broad consensus that acute whiplash is not uncommon, the topic of chronic whiplash is controversial, with studies in at least three countries showing zero to low prevalence, and some academics positing a linkage to financial issues.

== Signs and symptoms ==
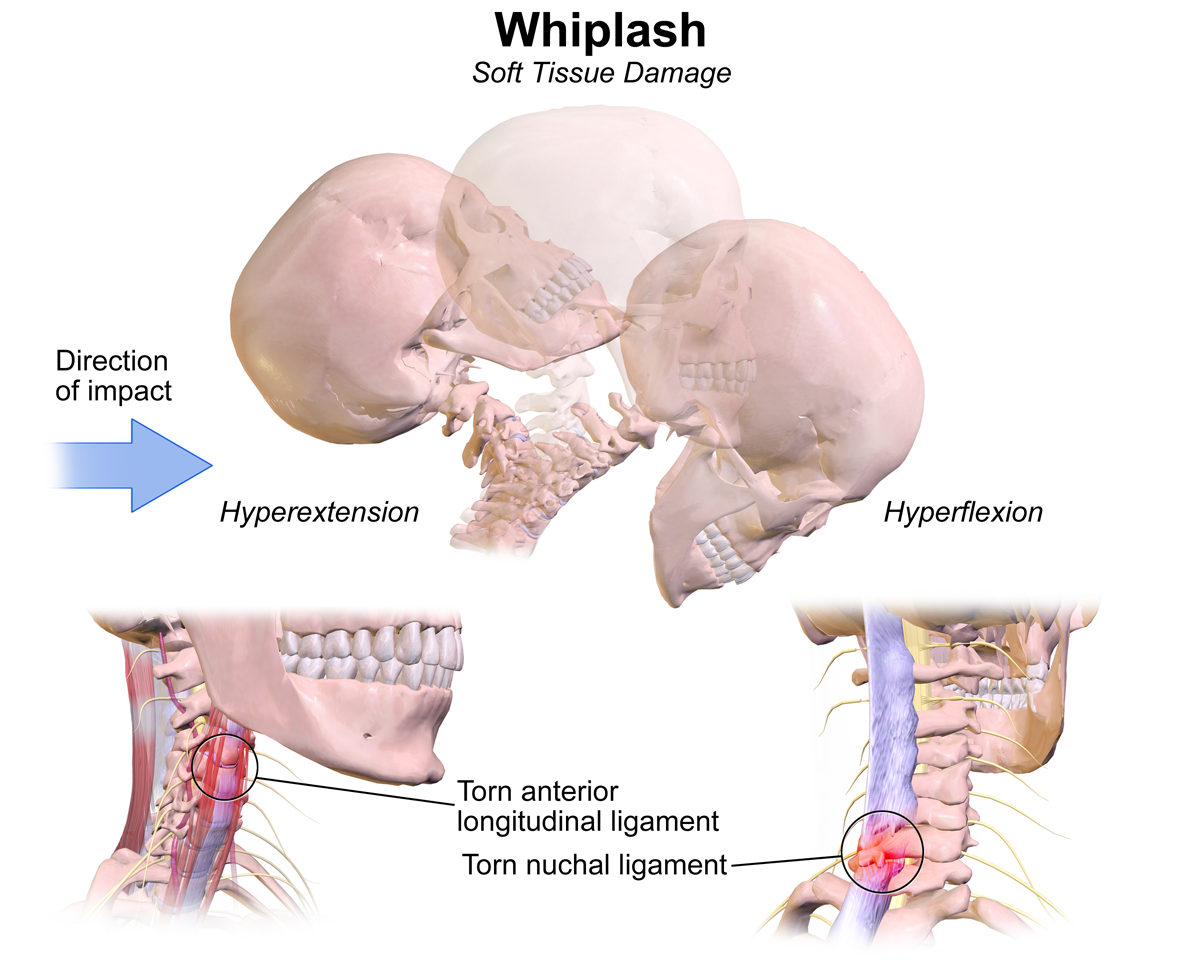
Whiplash

Symptoms reported by affected people include: pain and aching to the neck and back, referred pain to the shoulders, sensory disturbance (such as pins and needles) to the arms and legs, and headaches. Symptoms can appear directly after the injury, but often are not felt until days afterwards. Whiplash is usually confined to the spine. The most common areas of the spine affected by whiplash are the neck and middle of the spine. "Neck" pain is very common between the shoulder and the neck. The "missing link" of whiplash may be towards or inside the shoulder and this would explain why neck therapy alone frequently does not give lasting relief.

Cognitive symptoms following whiplash trauma, such as being easily distracted or irritated, seems to be common and possibly linked to a poorer prognosis.

== Cause ==
The exact injury mechanism that causes whiplash injuries is forceful sudden hyperextension followed by hyperflexion of the cervical vertebrae, mainly spraining the nuchal ligament and the Anterior Longitudinal Ligament respectively. A whiplash injury may be the result of impulsive retracting of the spine, mainly the ligament: anterior longitudinal ligament which is stretched or tears, as the head snaps forward and then back again causing a whiplash injury.A whiplash injury from an automobile accident is called a cervical acceleration–deceleration injury. Cadaver studies have shown that as an automobile occupant is hit from behind, the forces from the seat back compress the kyphosis of the thoracic spine, which provides an axial load on the lumbar spine and cervical spine. This forces the cervical spine to deform into an S-shape where the lower cervical spine is forced into a kyphosis while the upper cervical spine maintains its lordosis. As the injury progresses, the whole cervical spine is finally hyper-extended.

Whiplash may be caused by any motion similar to a rear-end collision in a motor vehicle, such as may take place on a roller coaster or other rides at an amusement park, sports injuries such as skiing accidents, other modes of transportation such as airplane travel, or from being hit, kicked or shaken.Whiplash associated disorders sometimes include injury to the cerebrum. In a severe cervical acceleration–deceleration syndrome, a brain injury known as a coup contrecoup injury occurs. A coup contrecoup injury occurs as the brain is accelerated into the cranium as the head and neck hyperextend, and is then accelerated into the other side as the head and neck rebound to hyper-flexion or neutral position.

"Volunteer studies of experimental, low-velocity rear-end collisions have shown a percentage of subjects to report short-lived symptoms",From this type of research, it has been inferred that whiplash symptoms might not always have any pathological (injury) explanation.

However, over the last decade, academic surgeons in the UK and US have sought to unravel the whiplash enigma. A 1000-case, four-year observational study published in 2012 said that the "missing link" in whiplash injuries is the trapezius muscle which may be damaged through eccentric muscle contraction during the whiplash mechanism described above and below. Another study suggested that "shneck pain" was in the nearby supraspinatus muscle and this resulted from a seemingly asymptomatic form of shoulder impingement. Shoulder impingement is commonly asymptomatic and the shoulder may be injured along with the neck in a motor vehicle accident. Whiplash due to The Referred Shoulder Impingement Syndrome was successfully treated using conventional treatments for shoulder impingement including anti-inflammatory steroids and non steroids, and by avoiding the overhead position of shoulder impingement during the day and night time. All of this work demonstrates that historically and indeed presently whiplash patients' pain sources may be missed if it is outside of the neck. Hence the pathology in whiplash may have been missed and the treatment ineffective.

== Mechanism ==
Whiplash can be described as a sudden strain to the muscles, bones and nerves in the neck. The neck is made up of seven vertebrae, referred to as the cervical vertebrae. The first two cervical vertebrae, the axis and atlas, are shaped differently from the remaining five. The atlas and axis are responsible for movement of the skull from side to side (cervical rotation to the right and left); also moving forward and backward (cervical flexion and extension). Excessive extension and flexion can disrupt the vertebrae.

There are four phases that occur during "whiplash": Initial position (before the collision); retraction; extension; and rebound. In the initial position, there is no force on the neck; it is stable due to inertia. Anterior longitudinal ligament injuries in whiplash may lead to cervical instability. They explain that during the retraction phase that is when the actual "whiplash" occurs, since there is an unusual loading of soft tissues. The next phase is the extension: the whole neck and head switches to extension, and it is stopped or limited by the head restraint. The rebound phase transpires as result of the phases that are mentioned.

During the retraction phase, the spine forms an S-Shaped curve, caused by the flexion in the upper planes and hyperextension at the lower planes. If this exceeds their physiological limits, in this phase the injuries occur to the lower cervical vertebrae. In the extension phase, all cervical vertebrae and the head are fully extended, but do not surpass their physiological limits. Most of the injuries happen in C-5 and C-6.

While the time associated with a specific collision will vary, the following provides an example of the occupant and seat interaction sequence for a collision lasting approximately 300 milliseconds.

0 ms	Rear car structure is impacted and begins to move forward and/or crushes; Occupant remains stationary; No occupant forces
100 ms	Vehicle seat accelerates and pushes into occupant's torso (i.e. central portion of the body in contact with seat); The torso loads the seat and is accelerated forward (seat will deflect rearward); Head remains stationary due to inertia
150 ms	Torso is accelerated by the vehicle seat and may start to ramp up the seat; Lower neck is pulled forward by the accelerated torso/seat; The head rotates and extends rapidly rearward hyper-extending the neck
175 ms	Head is still moving backwards; Vehicle seat begins to spring forward; The torso continues to be accelerated forward; The head rotation rearward is increased and is fully extended
300 ms	Head and torso are accelerated forward; Neck is "whipped" forward rotating and hyper-flexing the neck forward; The head accelerates due to neck motion and moves ahead of the seat back

== Diagnosis ==
Diagnosis occurs through a patient history, head and neck examination, X-rays to rule out bone fractures and may involve the use of medical imaging to determine if there are other injuries.

=== Québec Task Force ===
The Québec Task Force (QTF) has divided whiplash-associated disorders into five grades.

- Grade 0: no neck pain, stiffness, or any physical signs are noticed
- Grade 1: neck complaints of pain, stiffness or tenderness only but no physical signs are noted by the examining physician.
- Grade 2: neck complaints and the examining physician finds decreased range of motion and point tenderness in the neck.
- Grade 3: neck complaints plus neurological signs such as decreased deep tendon reflexes, weakness and sensory deficits.
- Grade 4: neck complaints and fracture or dislocation, or injury to the spinal cord.

== Prevention ==
The focus of preventive measures to date has been on the design of car seats, primarily through the introduction of head restraints, often called headrests. This approach is potentially problematic given the underlying assumption that purely mechanical factors cause whiplash injuries — an unproven theory. So far the injury reducing effects of head restraints appears to have been low, approximately 5–10%, because car seats have become stiffer in order to increase crashworthiness of cars in high-speed rear-end collisions which in turn could increase the risk of whiplash injury in low-speed rear impact collisions. Improvements in the geometry of car seats through better design and energy absorption could offer additional benefits. Active devices move the body in a crash in order to shift the loads on the car seat.

A Head restraint is a device designed to limit the rearward displacement of an adult occupant's head in relation to the torso in order to reduce the risk of injury to the cervical vertebrae in the event of a rear impact. The most effective head restraint must allow a backset motion of less than 60 mm to prevent the hyperextension of the neck during impact.

For the last 40 years, vehicle safety researchers have been designing and gathering information on the ability of head restraints to mitigate injuries resulting from rear-end collisions.

A major issue in whiplash prevention is the lack of proper adjustment of the seat safety system by both drivers and passengers. Studies have shown that a well designed and adjusted head restraint could prevent potentially injurious head-neck kinematics in rear-end collisions by limiting the differential movement of the head and torso. The primary function of a head restraint is to minimize the relative rearward movement of the head and neck during rear impact. During a rear-end collision, the presence of an effective head restraint behind the occupant's head can limit the differential movement of the head and torso. A properly placed head restraint where one can sufficiently protect his/her head lower the chances of head injury by up to 35% during a rear-end collision.

Some current systems are:

- Mercedes-Benz A-Class Active Head Restraint (AHR),
- Saab (Responsible for the first active head restraint), Opel, Ford, Nissan, Subaru, Hyundai, and Peugeot — Active Head restraint (SAHR),
- Volvo and Jaguar — Whiplash Protection System/Whiplash Prevention System (WHIPS), and
- Toyota — Whiplash Injury Lessening (WIL).

The Insurance Institute for Highway Safety (IIHS) and other testing centers around the world have been involved in testing the effectiveness of head restraint and seat systems in laboratory conditions to assess their ability to prevent or mitigate whiplash injuries. They have found that over 60% of new motor vehicles on the market have "good" rated head restraints.

== Management ==
=== Rehabilitation (e.g. physical therapy) ===
Symptoms remaining more than six months after trauma is labelled Whiplash syndrome. The main purpose with early rehabilitation is to reduce the risk for development of Whiplash syndrome. Early rehabilitation for whiplash depends on the grade category. It can be categorized as grade 0 being no pain to grade 4 with a cervical bone fracture or dislocation. Grade 4 obviously needs admission to hospital while grade 0-3 can be managed as outpatients. The symptoms from the potential injury to the cervical spine may be debilitating, and pain was reported to be one of the biggest stressor events experienced in daily living, so it is important to begin rehabilitation immediately to prevent future pain.

Current research supports that active mobilization rather than a soft collar results in a more prompt recovery both in the short and long term perspective. Furthermore, Schnabel and colleagues stated that the soft collar is not a suitable medium for rehabilitation, and the best way of recovery is to include an active rehabilitation program that includes physical therapy exercises and postural modifications. Another study found patients who participated in active therapy shortly after injury increased mobilization of the neck with significantly less pain within four weeks when compared to patients using a cervical collar.

Active treatments are light repetitive exercises that work the area to maintain normality. Basic information is also given to teach the patient that exercises as instructed will not cause any damage to their neck. These exercises are done at home or under the care of a health professional. When beginning a rehabilitation regimen, it's important to begin with slow movements which include cervical rotation until pain threshold three to five times per day, flexion and extension of the shoulder joint by moving the arms up and down two to three times, and combining shoulder raises while inhaling and releasing the shoulder raise while exhaling. Soderlund and colleagues also recommend that these exercises should be done every day until pain starts to dissipate. Early mobilization is important for preventing chronic pain, but pain experienced from these exercises might cause psychological symptoms that could have negative impact on recovery. Rosenfeld found that doing active exercises as often as once every waking hour during one month after trauma decreases the need for sick leave three years after trauma from 25% to 5.7%.

Passive treatments such as acupuncture, massage therapy, and stimulation may sometimes be used as a complement to active exercises. Return to normal activities of daily living should be encouraged as soon as possible to maximize and expedite full recovery.

For chronic whiplash patients, rehabilitation is recommended. Patients who entered a rehabilitation program said they were able to control their pain, they continued to use strategies that were taught to them, and were able to go back to their daily activities. A Cochrane review published in 2007 found that evidence neither supports nor refutes the effectiveness conservative treatments including physiotherapy, acupuncture, or a collar to treat Grades 1 or 2.

=== Medications ===
According to the recommendations made by the Quebec Task Force, treatment for individuals with whiplash associated disorders grade 1–3 may include non-narcotic analgesics. Non-steroidal anti-inflammatory drugs may also be prescribed in the case of WAD 2 and WAD 3, but their use should be limited to a maximum of three weeks. Botulinum toxin A is used to treat involuntary muscle contraction and spasms. Botulinum toxin type-A is only temporary and repeated injections need to take place in order to feel the effects.According to a year long follow-up study in 2008 on 186 patients, the WAD-classification and Quebec Task Force regimen were not linked to better clinical outcomes.

== Prognosis ==
The consequences of whiplash range from mild pain for a few days (which is the case for most people), to severe disability. It seems that around 50% will have some remaining symptoms.

Alterations in resting state cerebral blood flow have been demonstrated in patients with chronic pain after whiplash injury. There is evidence for persistent inflammation in the neck in patients with chronic pain after whiplash injury.

There has long been a proposed link between whiplash injuries and the development of temporomandibular joint dysfunction (TMD). A recent review concluded that although there are contradictions in the literature, overall there is moderate evidence that TMD can occasionally follow whiplash injury, and that the incidence of this occurrence is low to moderate.

== Epidemiology ==
Whiplash is the term commonly used to describe hyperflexion and hyperextension, and is one of the most common nonfatal car crash injuries. More than one million whiplash injuries occur each year due to car crashes. This is an estimate because not all cases of whiplash are reported. In a given year, an estimated 3.8 people per 1000 experience whiplash symptoms. "Freeman and co-investigators estimated that 6.2% of the US population have late whiplash syndrome". The majority of cases occur in patients in their late fourth decade. Unless a cervical strain has occurred with additional brain or spinal cord trauma mortality is rare.

Whiplash can occur at speeds of fifteen miles per hour or less; it is the sudden jolt, as one car hits another, that causes one's head to be abruptly thrown back and sideways. The more sudden the motion, the more bones, discs, muscles and tendons in ones neck and upper back will be damaged. Spinal cord injuries are responsible for about 6,000 deaths in the US each year and 5,000 whiplash injuries per year result in quadriplegia.

After 12 months, only 1 in 5 patients remain symptomatic, only 11.5% of individuals were able to return to work a year after the injury, and only 35.4% were able to get back to work at a similar level of performance after 20 years. Estimated indirect costs to industry are $66,626 per year, depending on the level and severity. Lastly, the total cost per year was $40.5 billion in 2008, a 317% increase over 1998.

== Incidence ==
Altogether it is of note that, especially in many Western countries, after a motor vehicle collision those involved seek health care for the assessment of injuries and for insurance documentation purposes. In contrast, in many less wealthy countries, there may be limited access to care and insurance may only be available to the wealthy. Against this background, the "(late) whiplash syndrome" (ICD-10: S13.4) has been one special focus of continuous and controversial scientific research since the 1950s as the worldwide incidence of such injuries varies enormously, from 16 to 2000 per 100,000 population, and the late whiplash syndrome in these cases varies between 18% and 40%. Thus, important work by Schrader et al. in The Lancet showed that late whiplash syndrome after a motor vehicle collision is rare or uncommon in Lithuania, and Cassidy et al.'s conclusion in the New England Journal of Medicine is that "the elimination of compensation for pain and suffering is associated with a decreased incidence and improved prognosis of whiplash injury".

Moreover, an experimental study in 2001 places participants in a stationary vehicle with a curtain blocking their rear view, and exposed them to a simulated rear-end collision. Twenty percent of patients had symptoms at 3 days, despite the fact that no collision actually occurred.

From the evolving viewpoint of naturalistic Internet search engine analytics it has been shown in 2017 that the expectations for receiving compensation may influence Internet search behavior in relation to whiplash injury.

== See also ==
- Railway spine
- Traffic collision
- Rabbit punch
