= Wandering womb =

Outdated diagnosis in female health

Wandering womb was the belief that a displaced uterus was the cause of many medical pathologies in women. The belief was first attested in the medical texts of ancient Greece, and even though some opposed this theory, it persisted in European academic medicine and popular thought for centuries. The wandering womb as a concept was popularized by doctor Edward Jorden, who published The Suffocation of the Mother in 1603. However, this belief was eventually discredited with advances in anatomy and psychology.

== Origins ==
One of the first clearly documented mentions of the wandering womb was by Plato in his book, Timaeus. He states:

the same is the case with the so-called womb or matrix of women; the animal within them is desirous of procreating children, and when remaining unfruitful long beyond its proper time, gets discontented and angry, and wandering in every direction through the body, closes up the passages of the breath, and, by obstructing respiration, drives them to extremity, causing all varieties of disease.

— Plato, Timaeus

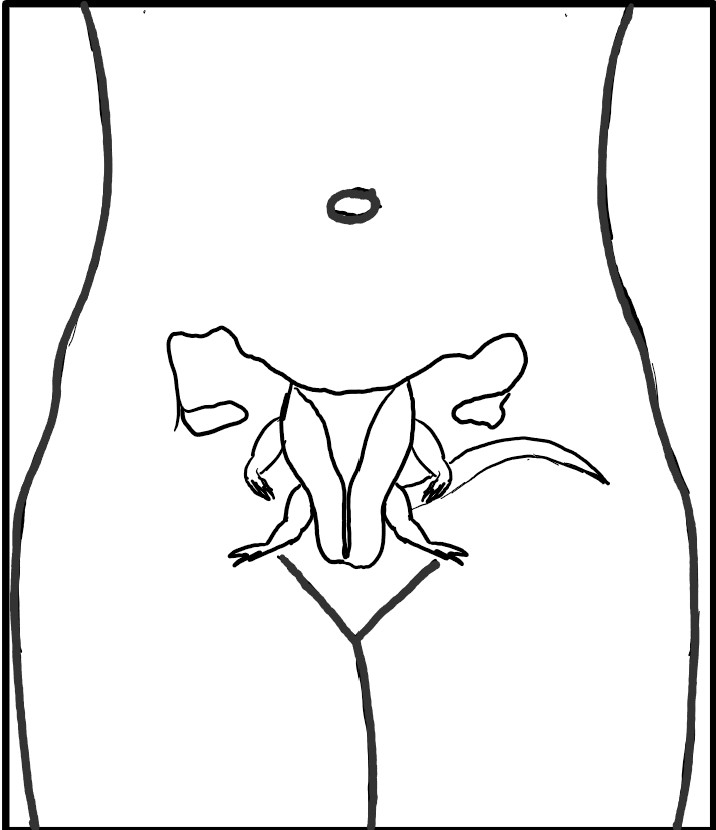
A contemporary artist's depiction of the wandering womb, anthropomorphized with a reptilian tail and a set of legs and arms. It is based on descriptions dating back to ancient times.

Here, Plato personifies the womb as an animal-like entity inside a woman's body; one that desires to bear children. He believed that if a woman remained childless for too long, the womb would become upset or “angry,” and begin to move or "wander" through the body in search of fulfillment. As it moved, the womb was said to disrupt the body's internal balance, and block the passages for breath. This disruption was thought to cause breathing difficulties and a wide range of illnesses or symptoms. The womb was viewed not only as a reproductive organ, but also as an active and restless creature that could harm a woman’s health if it was unsatisfied or left "idle."

The belief in the "wandering womb" was found in ancient Greece. Some scholars have argued that it originated in Egypt, but this has now been disproved. One description of the theory of a "wandering womb" comes from Aretaeus, a physician from Cappadocia, who was a contemporary of Galen in the 2nd century AD. He wrote that the uterus could move out of place, and float within the body. In the translation of Francis Adams (1856) this reads:

In the middle of the flanks of women lies the womb, a female viscus, closely resembling an animal; for it is moved of itself hither and thither in the flanks, also upwards in a direct line to below the cartilage of the thorax, and also obliquely to the right or to the left, either to the liver or the spleen, and it likewise is subject to prolapsus downwards, and in a word, it is altogether erratic. It delights also in fragrant smells, and advances towards them; and it has an aversion to fetid smells, and flees from them; and, on the whole, the womb is like an animal within an animal.

The Greek translated here as "like an animal within an animal" would be better translated as "like a living thing inside another living thing". The belief that the uterus could move freely, which this imagery evokes, was linked to the use of scent therapy to entice it up or down within the body. This may have been part of ancient cultural beliefs in Greece, but the earliest known written accounts of it are in the fifth- and fourth-century BCE texts associated with the name of Hippocrates. One of the first gynecological treaties that includes a reference to the "wandering womb" was written in medical treaties credited to Hippocrates. The movement of the uterus was believed to cause symptoms throughout the body, depending on the destination to which the uterus moved in search of fluid.

== Hysteria ==
The idea of a condition called hysteria caused by "wandering womb" developed from the "hysterical suffocation" of ancient Greek writers. Medical researchers developed a better understanding of anatomy after the invention of microscopes in the 17th century and cellular research in the 19th century. Sigmund Freud's theory of the free-floating unconscious, the "mind within the mind", was similar to the ancient belief in the "animal within the animal".

Suffocation of the Mother was the first text on the subjects of the wandering womb and hysteria that was written in English. Edward Jorden, the author of this text, used hysteria as an explanation for mysterious medical occurrences in young women. He supposed that the hysteria caused by the "wandering" of the womb around the body was the source of witchcraft, and often presided in witchcraft-related trials as an expert on the subject. The Suffocation of the Mother connected the phenomenon of hysteria with actions like singing, laughing, crying, and choking.

Both "wandering womb" and "hysteria" are unused in medical theories of today.

== Impact on women ==
Women have been treated differently from men, holding fewer rights, relegated to lesser social and economic statuses, and subjected to male sexual exploitation and violence. Hysteria was sometimes used as a justification for this treatment, as at various times, doctors, philosophers, and religious officials argued wandering wombs made women irrational. Aristotle’s viewed women as subordinate to men, and naturally so given their biology. He viewed emotional variability as detrimental to character, which was used to justify limiting women’s access to education and participation in public life. In the nineteenth- and twentieth-centuries, psychoanalysts—and later, psychiatrists—frequently used the diagnosis of "hysteria" as a catch-all, often pathologizing unruly or antisocial behavior in women. Although the diagnosis was removed upon publication of the DSM-3 in 1980, the damaging cultural notions about hysterical women persist, as do the dismissive, pathologizing attitudes towards women and their emotions.

== Opposing views ==
Soranus of Ephesus, another second century CE physician, opposed the theory of the "wandering womb". In a description of what he labelled "hysterical suffocation" – suffocation arising in the uterus – Soranus wrote, "the uterus does not issue forth like a wild animal from the lair, delighted by fragrant odors and fleeing bad odors, rather it is drawn together because of stricture caused by inflammation". Where Aretaeus used the more neutral "living thing", Soranus used the term for "wild beast", therion. Galen also insisted that the uterus was stationary and that symptoms were due to substances being retained inside it. This suggests that Aretaeus was unusual among physicians of his period in believing in a mobile and animate womb. Despite the fact that Soranus was an influential writer on gynecology, and that Galen was the Greco-Roman medical writer with the greatest overall influence on Medieval and Renaissance medicine in Europe, the belief in the "wandering womb" continued for centuries, for example in Edward Jorden's influential 1603 treatise on the supposed bewitching of 14-year-old Mary Glover.

== See also ==
- Ancient Greek medicine
- Childbirth and obstetrics in antiquity
- Female genital prolapse
- Gynecology
- Medical research
- Women in medicine
