= Edward Jorden =

English physician and chemist

Edward Jorden (1569–1633) was an English physician and chemist.

== Life ==
Jorden was born in High Halden, Kent. His university education in England is disputed. One account states that Jorden "was the younger son of a gentleman of good family. He studied at Oxford, probably at Hart Hall, travelled on the continent, meeting Andreas Libavius, and obtained an MD at Padua (c.1591), where he became familiar with the work of Fallopius and earlier contributors to the development of methods for the examination of mineral waters who were connected with that University." Another account has him educated at Peterhouse, Cambridge, where he graduated BA 1583 and MA 1586.

Both accounts agree that he received his medical education in Italy, while travelling widely and attending classes at the universities of Padua, Bologna, Ferrara and Venice, and receiving his MD from Padua in 1591.

He became a Licentiate of the Royal College of Physicians in November 1595 and a Fellow in December 1597. He practised as a physician in Bishopsgate, London from 1596–1600. He practised medicine in Bath from 1600 where he died on 7 January 1633, being buried in the Abbey Church.

== Censorial hearing ==
In 1595, Jorden was involved in a dispute with an apothecary about the treatment he had recommended to a patient. A censorial medical hearing on 4 July 1595, before a judge decided partly in Jorden's favour but he "was examined and was granted verbal authority to practise provided that he read Galen's "De Temperamentis," "De Elementis" (ex Hippocrates), "De (Naturalibus) Facultatibus," "De (Causis) Morborum," "De Symptomatum Causis," "De Symptomatum Differentiis," and the "De Locis Affectis," before Michaelmas. Upon his reappearance before the judge on 7 Nov 1595 he was examined on Galen, which he had been asked to read. His performance was exemplary. He was permitted to practice upon payment of 4 marks p.a."

== Hysteria ==
"Edward Jorden's book on hysteria - the first on the subject to be written in English. A Briefe Discourse of a Disease Called the Suffocation of the Mother, 1603. ... Edward Jorden (1569 - 1632) was the first English physician who viewed the women who were accused of witchcraft as unfortunate persons suffering from some medical condition. Asserting that there were natural causes for their afflictions, Jorden often served as expert witness at trials of women accused of witchery. His arguments did not always persuade the judges, however. One Elizabeth Jackson, accused of causing the fits suffered by May Glover, was convicted in spite of Jorden's defense. Jorden (1603) called the disorder manifested in Jackson (and in the majority of supposed witches) by two terms: hysterical, and strangulatus uteri, or "suffocation of the mother" (mother here being an old-fashioned term for the uterus), since a choking in the throat was a common accompaniment. Jorden was impressed by the panoply and ever-shifting quality of symptoms associated with this condition: now shortness of breath, now palpitations, now paralysis, and so on. He was also aware that the hysterical "fits" might occur with varying regularity: yearly, monthly, or even weekly."

== Publications ==
- A Briefe Discourse of a Disease called the Suffocation of the Mother by Edward Jorden, 1603
- A Discourse of Naturall Bathes, and Minerall Waters by Edward Jorden, 1631
