= William Meredith (American football) =

American football coach (died 1959)

Biographical details
- Born: Londonderry, Ohio, U.S.
- Died: May 14, 1959
- Education: Denison

Coaching career (HC unless noted)

Football
- 1923–1925: Ashland
- 1926–1928: Ohio Northern

Basketball
- 1923–1926: Ashland

Head coaching record
- Overall: 19–32 (basketball)

William F. Meredith (died May 14, 1959) was an American football and basketball coach. He served as the head football coach (1923–1925) and head men's basketball coach (1923–1926) at Ashland University in Ashland, Ohio. Meredith was the head football coach at Ohio Northern University in Ada, Ohio from 1926 to 1928.
