= William Meredith (surgeon) =

General surgeon (1848 - 1916)

William Appleton Meredith (1848–1916) was an American surgeon who made his career in the United Kingdom. He became a fellow of the Royal College of Surgeons.

== Life ==
Meredith was born in New York City, the son of Samuel Ogden Meredith. He was educated at Boulogne-sur-Mer, and became a medical student at University College, London, and then at the University of Edinburgh. He returned to London with Knowsley Thornton, to assist Sir Spencer Wells and Sir John Erichsen. He established himself as a surgeon, and specialised in ovariotomy. His views on technique were conservative.

== Publications ==
- Some Points affecting the Mortality of Abdominal Section, Tabulated Record of 125 Cases - Med-Chir Trans, 1889, lxxii, 31.
- An Address on the Present Position of Abdominal Surgery. - Med Soc Trans, 1890, xiii, 398.
