= John Eric Erichsen =

British surgeon (1818–1896)

Sir John Eric Erichsen 1st Baronet, MRCS FRS
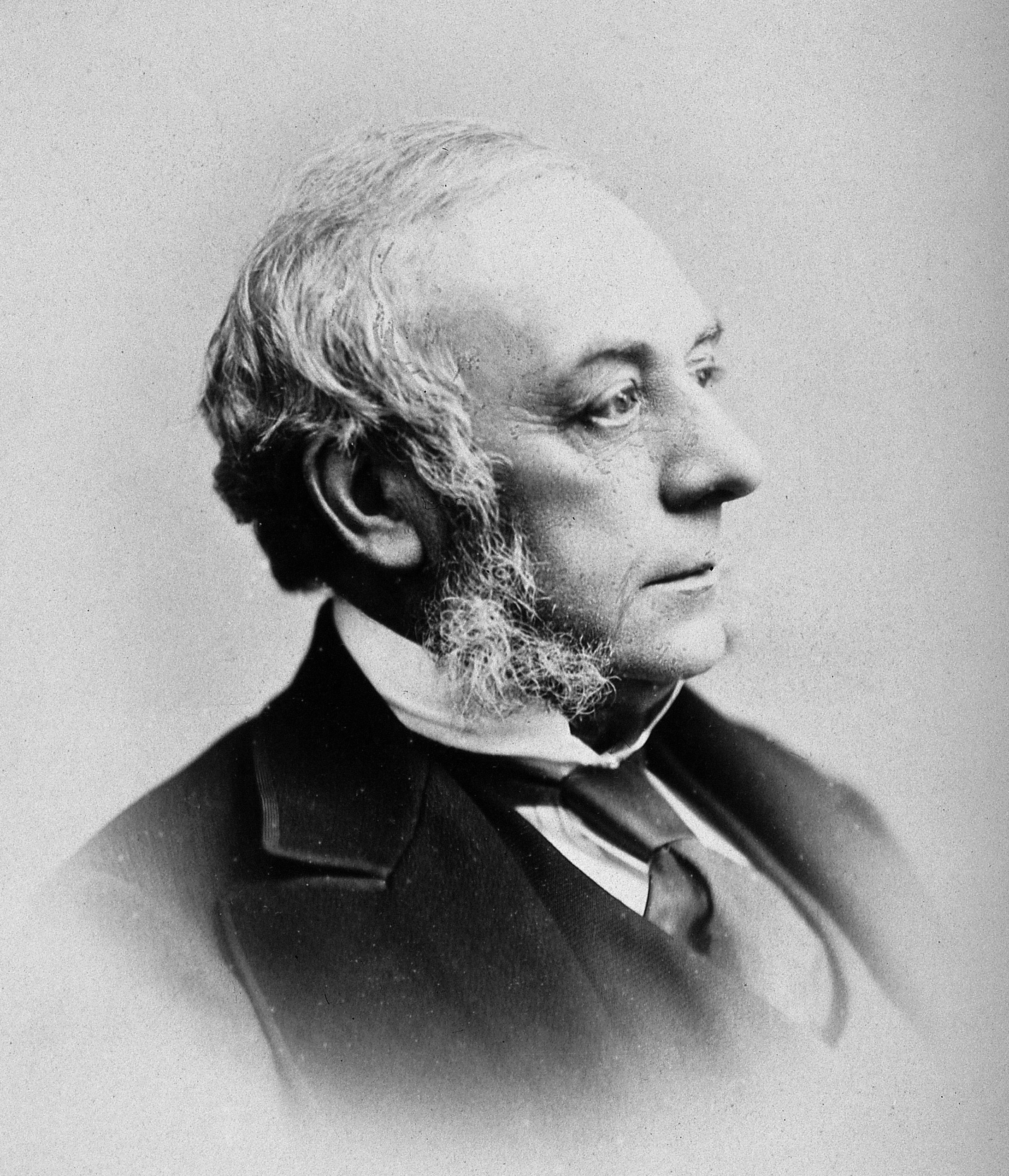
- Born: 19 July 1818; Copenhagen, Denmark
- Died: 23 September 1896 (aged 78); Folkestone, Kent, England
- Resting place: Hamstead Cemetery
- Education: Mansion house school, Hammersmith, University College Hospital Medical School
- Occupation: Surgeon
- Known for: Surgical skills, particularly following railway accidents
- Notable work: The science and the art of surgery, 1st edition 1853
- Spouse: Mary Elizabeth
- Honours: President of the council of University College

Sir John Eric Erichsen, 1st Baronet (19 July 1818 – 23 September 1896) was a Danish-born British surgeon.

== Early life ==
Erichsen was born in Copenhagen, the son of Eric Erichsen, a member of a well-known Danish banking family. He attended Mansion house school, Hammersmith.

== Surgical career ==
Erichsen began his medical studies at University College, London under Robert Liston. Going on to Paris, he witnessed his first colotomy under Amussat before returning to London as a house surgeon. He devoted himself in the early years of his career to physiology, and lecturing on general anatomy and physiology at University College Hospital.

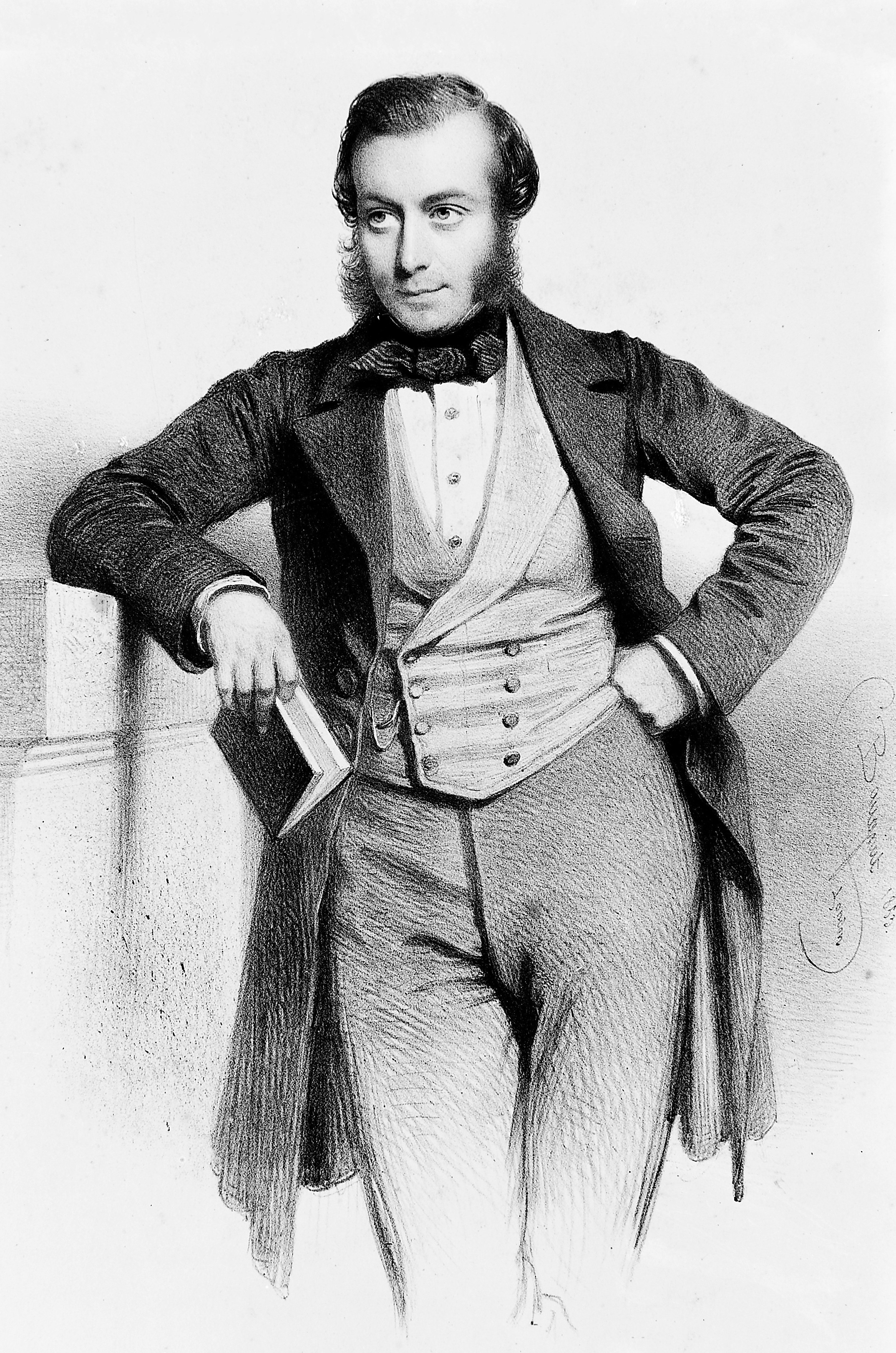
John Eric Erichsen in 1853

In 1844 Erichsen was secretary to the physiological section of the British Association, and in 1845 he was awarded the Fothergillian gold medal of the Royal Humane Society for his essay on asphyxia. In 1848 he was appointed assistant surgeon at University College Hospital, and in 1850 became a full surgeon and professor of surgery, his lectures and clinical teaching being much admired; and in 1875 he joined the consulting staff. In June 1876 he was elected a Fellow of the Royal Society. By 1887, he held his most prestigious honour of president of the council of university college.

His Science and Art of Surgery (1853) went through many editions, of which Marcus Beck had the 8th and 9th editions include Joseph Lister's antiseptic techniques and Pasteur and Robert Koch's germ theory. He rose to be president of the Royal College of Surgeons of England in 1880. From 1879 to 1881 he was president of the Royal Medical and Chirurgical Society. He was created a baronet on 26 February 1895, having been for some years surgeon-extraordinary to Queen Victoria. As a surgeon his reputation was worldwide, and he counts (says Sir W. MacCormac in his volume on the Centenary of the Royal College of Surgeons) among the makers of modern surgery. He was a recognized authority on concussion of the spine, and was often called to give evidence in court on apparent cases of railway spine.

Erichsen is inaccurately credited with this statement from 1873: "There cannot always be fresh fields of conquest by the knife; there must be portions of the human frame that will ever remain sacred from its intrusions, at least in the surgeon's hands. That we have already, if not quite, reached these final limits, there can be little question. The abdomen, the chest, and the brain will be forever shut from the intrusion of the wise and humane surgeon." (quoted in Christopher Cerf and Victor Navasky (eds.), I Wish I Hadn't Said That: The Experts Speak and Get it Wrong! (2000), 31). (Cf. Clarke's First Law, from Profiles of the Future – see Wikipedia article, Clarke's Three Laws: "When a distinguished but elderly scientist states that something is possible, he is almost certainly right. When he states that something is impossible, he is very probably wrong.")

The correct quotation is "There cannot always be fresh fields for conquest by the knife. There must be portions of the human frame that will ever remain sacred from its intrusion – at least, in the surgeon’s hand. That we have nearly, if not quite, reached these final limits there can be little question." The final sentence in the inaccurately quoted statement actually comes from a biography of Joseph Lister, written well after Erichsen died, in which the following sentence appears: "Mr. Erichsen believed that the abdomen, the brain, and the chest would be forever shut from the intrusions of a wise and humane surgeon." Later writers falsely attributed these words by the biographer to Erichsen himself, but this attribution is inappropriate: the text in Erichsen's 1873 address immediately following the quoted sentences mentions surgical procedures "from the base of the brain to the lowest organ in the pelvic cavity" as "triumphs of the surgeon's art." A more complete reading of Erichsen's address suggests that his views were much more nuanced.

== Personal life ==
Erichsen married Mary Elizabeth on 10 September 1842, eldest daughter of Captain Thomas Cole RN. She died childless in 1893. His personality has been described as "honourable and candid" and his appearance as "attractive". He was considered a gentleman and known for accepting his junior surgeon's advances.

Erichsen died at Folkestone in 1896 and was buried in Hampstead Cemetery.

Baronetage of the United Kingdom
New creation	Baronet (of Cavendish Place); 1895–1896	Extinct
Preceded by Newnes baronets	Erichsen baronets of Cavendish Place; 26 February 1895	Succeeded by Reynolds baronets
