= Fucking Machines =

Pornographic website featuring sex machines

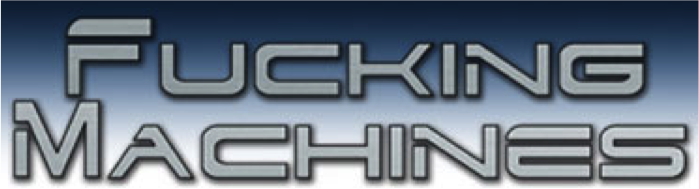
- Logo

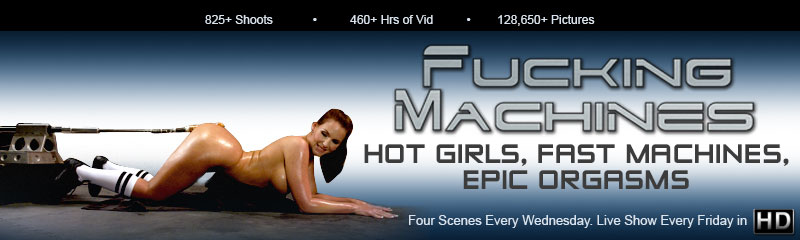
- Website banner Top banner for website
- Website type: Autoerotic; Internet pornography
- Available in: English
- Owner: Kink.com
- Creator: Peter Acworth
- Website: Official website
- Commercial: Yes
- Registration: Required
- Users: 10,900 visitors per day
- Launched: September 25, 2000; 26 years ago
- Current status: Active

Fucking Machines (also known as fuckingmachines.com and fuckingmachines) is a pornographic website founded in 2000 that features video and photographs of women engaged in autoerotic sexual stimulation with penetrative sex-machines and sex toys. Based in San Francisco, California, the site is operated by Kink.com. Web entrepreneur Peter Acworth launched Fucking Machines on September 25, 2000, as his company's second website after Kink.com. Devices shown on the site were created with the intent to bring women authentic orgasms. Performers were instructed to allow themselves to be recorded experiencing pleasure.

After the site applied in 2005 to trademark the phrase "fuckingmachines", the United States Patent and Trademark Office (USPTO) denied the application and ruled that the mark was obscene. Free speech lawyer Marc Randazza represented the site and appealed the decision. Orlando Weekly called his legal brief "one of the most entertaining legal documents you're likely to come across." The appeal was denied in April 2008 and the case was terminated. Randazza's argument in the case became known as The Fuck Brief.

The website has been the subject of attention from journalists and academics studying sexuality. Writer Regina Lynn highlighted the site's emphasis on communication, and Annalee Newitz of AlterNet classed it as part of Porn 2.0. Violet Blue wrote in The Adventurous Couple's Guide to Sex Toys that it helped popularize the idea of machines aiding in sex acts. The 2008 edition of The Oxford Encyclopedia of Women in World History described the aesthetic of the devices as disturbing. Jessica Roy wrote for The New York Observer that Fucking Machines' examples of orgasms were a form of transhumanism. Sarah Schaschek devoted a chapter to the phenomenon in Screening the Dark Side of Love: From Euro-Horror to American Cinema, titled "Fucking Machines: High-Tech Bodies in Pornography". She observed, "Strictly speaking, the women in these videos are both the controllers and the controlled."

== History ==
=== Film production ===
Fucking Machines examples

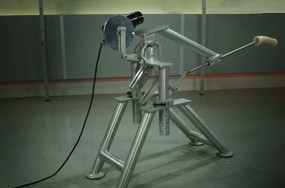
Bunny Fucker

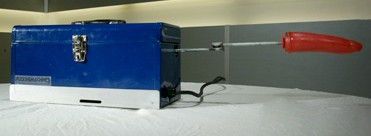
The Toolbox

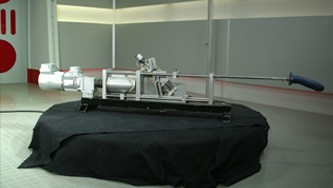
Annihilator

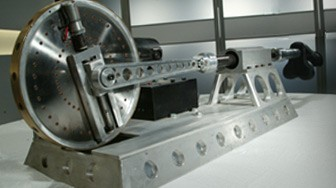
Intruder MK II

Examples of machines used in films by the site Fucking Machines

Peter Acworth founded Fucking Machines as the second website within his company Cybernet Entertainment, Inc., and it launched on September 25, 2000. Cybernet Entertainment subsequently began to use the name Kink.com for business purposes. The director and webmaster of the site, who uses the professional name Tomcat, received a university degree in film and media, and had experience with filmmaking and operating the sex-machines. He began work at Kink.com as a production assistant. He focused his direction style on filming the female participants experiencing sincere pleasure from the machines.

The site features machines designed to bring women orgasms. Sarah Schaschek noted in Screening the Dark Side of Love that the majority of the film production crew members were female. Across its websites, Kink.com formed a values statement and set of guidelines for directors and performers, taking preventative measures against victimization. The site production staff developed a practice of interviewing performers both before and after the film sessions. Models appearing on Fucking Machines film shoots are instructed to be authentic and experience pleasure from the machines without acting.

In 2007, Fucking Machines relocated with the other Kink.com sites to the San Francisco Armory. Film shoots take place in the basement of the Armory. Fucking Machines was featured at the 2007 AVN Adult Entertainment Expo in Las Vegas, Nevada, with a marketing tagline, "Sex at 350 rpm". They published a book that demonstrated inventions including "The Drilldo" and "The Double Crane". A device called the "Cunnilingus Machine", which incorporated rubber tongues on a moving chain apparatus, was featured in 2007 as part of the Adult Treasure Expo in Japan at the Makuhari Messe convention center. The Arse Elektronika sex and technology seminar, held in October 2007 in San Francisco, California, featured a robot from Fucking Machines called "Fuckzilla" in a live performance with one of the expo attendees. Kink.com signed a deal in 2007 with Pulse Distribution to sell material from Fucking Machines and its other sites to consumers in a DVD format. The first DVD distributed by the site in 2008 was titled Fucking Machines Volume 1 and featured 211 minutes of material with performers Aliana Love, Michah Moore, Lexi Love, and Sasha Grey.

By 2009 the website included 50 devices in its films. A 2009 article in SF Weekly was critical of the California state government for directing tax revenue towards classes on film production which were attended by Fucking Machines video editors. This article, in turn, was criticized by TheSword.com and characterized as "prudishness" by SFist and the San Francisco Bay Guardian.

The website asserts to its visitors that all performers engaged in sexual activities depicted in the videos appear of their own volition and feel bliss and gratification from the experience. The majority of new entrants to the adult film industry enjoyed their work with Fucking Machines because they discovered it was more socially acceptable to perform with a sexual device, rather than a human partner. Public relations manager for Kink.com Thomas Roche observed in a 2009 interview that Fucking Machines did not have a focus on BDSM material. In September 2010 the site had a live filming with an audience of 40 spectators, followed by the introduction in November 2010 of an interactive format in which viewers could watch shoots and recommend devices for the participants. By 2012 the site had 500 hours of archival footage with adult film performers, including Alexis Texas, Flower Tucci, and Sasha Grey. As of January 1, 2020 the site has stopped posting new videos.

=== Trademark appeal ===
Fucking Machines filed a request in July 2005 to the United States Patent and Trademark Office (USPTO) to secure its intellectual property rights for the mark "fuckingmachines", having met the first standard that the word was not in use by any other entity. The site became involved in a trademark dispute when the USPTO refused to grant a trademark for the name of the site, asserting that it was obscene. The case for Fucking Machines' use of the mark was handled by free speech attorney Marc Randazza.

The decision of the U.S. government was determined by lawyer Michael Engel, who ruled: "Registration is refused because the proposed mark consists of or comprises immoral or scandalous matter. The term 'fucking' is an offensive and vulgar reference to the act of sex. ... A mark that is deemed scandalous ... is not registrable." The USPTO based its rejection on a 1905 statute. It had previously refused the applications of 39 marks for using the word "fuck" and five marks for using the word "fucking". Requests to trademark terms including "shit" had been turned down by the USPTO 50 times, and a mark using "cunt" was rejected. Trademarks including the word "ass" had been accepted 135 times, and the word "bitch" was approved in several trademarks as well.

In response to the USPTO decision in the case, Randazza stated, "The trademark office has gone off the deep end with 2(a) rejections." Section 2(a), 15 USC §1052(a) disallows requests for marks that have "immoral, deceptive, or scandalous matter".

The Fuck Brief, by free speech lawyer Marc Randazza

Cybernet Entertainment, LLC, filed an "amendment and response to office action" of the USPTO decision in August 2006. Randazza introduced his brief with: "The Applicant respectfully challenges this characterization of the word 'fucking' and its allegedly 'offensive and vulgar' root: 'fuck'." Orlando Weekly commented on Randazza's brief in the case: "Randazza ... is frequently involved in free-speech cases – is fighting the federal government for your right to trademark any dirty word you please. And his filing in the case is one of the most entertaining legal documents you're likely to come across." Randazza's argument in the case came to be known as The Fuck Brief.

Randazza argued:

[T]his much maligned four-letter word has no intrinsic meaning. Fuck [can] play a role as a figurative term, for example, "to fuck" can also mean "to deceive." It is a word of force that can assist us in our expressions of joy when used as an infix, as in "abso-fucking-lutely". "Fuck" helps us express rage when we scream "fuck you" at a football referee, or at a motorist who has just cut us off in traffic. "Fuck" can help us express pain, as it is quite frequently the first thing out of most men's mouths when they strike their thumb (accidentally) with a hammer. "Fuck" is a vehicle for our disappointment, when we see that our report card is not as good as we had hoped, or when our significant other is late for dinner, or leaves us altogether. "Fuck" is an old friend, who can always make us laugh.

Randazza explained to Orlando Weekly that he used the word "fuck" routinely throughout his brief as part of his argument that the term is used in a variety of ways. He cited related terms, including "fuck-me boots", and frequent use of the word "fuck" in films including Wedding Crashers, Casino, and Jay and Silent Bob Strike Back.

The reply by Engel for the USPTO acknowledged the routine use of the word, and simultaneously asserted its scandalous nature: "Although the word is frequently used, it still is considered shocking in most formal or polite situations. For example, the word is bleeped out on basic cable, and broadcasters can be fined by the FCC for letting the word go out on the airwaves." He argued that the word was restricted in the workplace and by government regulations.

Randazza filed an appeal on June 5, 2007, and the matter was scheduled for a hearing before the Trademark Trial and Appeal Board. Acworth told Orlando Weekly he considered ceasing appeals when the mark had initially been rejected by the USPTO. He said he was not intending to be the adult industry's representative for First Amendment rights. Acworth stated to Orlando Weekly, "Marc talked me into it. I'm not normally this sort of person. Marc thought he had a pretty good shot at it. I'm really going on his advice. ... I have no real agenda with it."

Adult entertainment attorney Robert Apgood stated he agreed with the actions of Acworth and Randazza. Apgood pointed out he had observed a significant increase in applications to the USPTO that were rejected because their potential trademarks were deemed "scandalous" by the government. He stated, "It's really quite unfortunate that the executive branch is now reaching deep into the machinations of government to further its 'legislation of morality' agenda. It is truly encouraging to see the likes of Acworth and Randazza take up this sorely needed fight." The appeal was denied in April 2008 and the case was terminated. The application status was last listed as "abandoned" for failure to respond by the appealing party.

== Analysis ==
Advice columnist Dan Savage recommended the site in 2004 for readers interested in learning more about sex-machines. In the 2005 book edited by Carly Milne Naked Ambition, writer Regina Lynn commented on the site's emphasis on communication. Author Timothy Archibald consulted the operators behind Fucking Machines for research on his book Sex Machines: Photographs and Interviews.

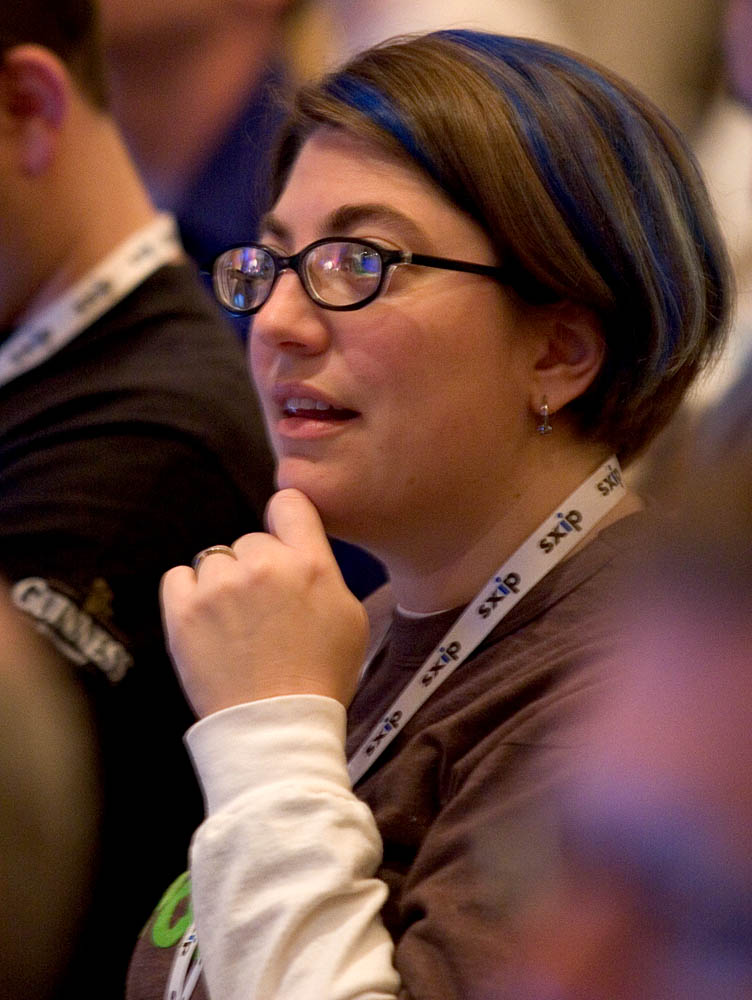
Annalee Newitz characterized Fucking Machines as part of the Porn 2.0 phenomenon.

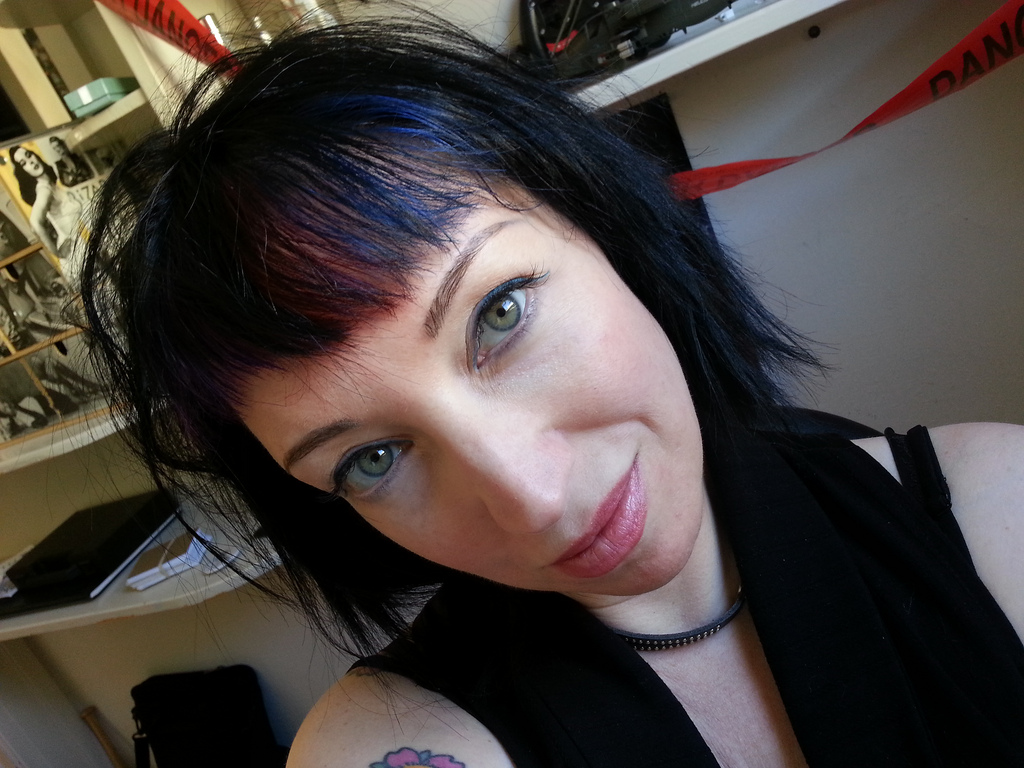
Violet Blue wrote that Fucking Machines enabled other companies to produce devices for people to use at home.

Annalee Newitz of AlterNet visited the set of Fucking Machines in 2006 and classed the production as part of the phenomenon of Porn 2.0. (Note: Porn 2.0 is a term derived from Web 2.0 referencing user participation in creation of online adult entertainment content.) Author Violet Blue wrote in her 2006 book The Adventurous Couple's Guide to Sex Toys, "Fucking Machines put machine sex on the map and into the popular consciousness, paving the way for a few individual companies to mass produce somewhat affordable sex-machines that couples and individuals can purchase and use at home."

In her 2007 book Naked on the Internet, author Audacia Ray wrote of the fucking machines: "In the fusion of female sexuality and technology, the curious and enthralling thing about these toys is the way in which they cast sexuality and technology together in a near miasma of technophobia and technofetishism." Jon Mooallem of The New York Times Magazine described the website as "dedicated entirely to women having sex with large and distressingly elaborate machines." In an article for Wired News, Regina Lynn noted that the presence of Fucking Machines at the 2007 AVN Adult Entertainment Expo was a move to the mainstream for the website: "The website has been around for years, in that grey area of 'indie internet kink' the Industry doesn't quite understand. Yet this year it is smack dab in the middle of the mainstream porn."

Bonnie Ruberg of The Village Voice wrote in a 2008 article that Fucking Machines replaces the insecurity men feel about vibrators and transform it into a turn-on. The 2008 edition of The Oxford Encyclopedia of Women in World History described the aesthetic of the devices on the site as harrowing. In his 2009 book From Aches to Ecstasy, author Arnold P. Abbott commented of the devices used by the site: "Fucking Machines are mechanical marvels which had to be invented by the Marquis De Sade himself." He observed that some of the machines, "would seem to be replicas to those used during the Inquisition to extract false confessions".

In a 2012 article for The New York Observer, journalist Jessica Roy characterized Fucking Machines' examples of orgasms as a form of transhumanism. (Note: Transhumanism refers to a movement supporting use of technology to enhance human abilities.) In the book Screening the Dark Side of Love: From Euro-Horror to American Cinema (2012), Sarah Schaschek devoted a chapter to the phenomenon, titled "Fucking Machines: High-Tech Bodies in Pornography". Schaschek concluded,

While antipornography feminists usually criticize that female performers are visually and practically degraded by men in heterosexual pornography, it is hard to uphold such an impression in the FuckingMachines videos. Given that all pornography eroticizes difference, and given that sexual fantasies usually require clearly drawn roles of dominance and submission, the women of FuckingMachines seem to resist at least a few of these categories. ... Strictly speaking, the women in these videos are both the controllers and the controlled.

== See also ==
- Censorship in the United States
- Cohen v. California
- Freedom of speech in the United States
- Fuck (2005 film)
- Fuck: Word Taboo and Protecting Our First Amendment Liberties
- The F-Word
- Mechanophilia
- Object sexuality
- Sexual fetishism
- Sybian
- Teledildonics
