= Sex machine (disambiguation) =

Sex Machine may refer to:

== Human sexuality ==
- Sex machine, a mechanized apparatus that acts as an automated erotic stimulation device
- Virtual sex machine or teledildonics, computer-controlled sex toys
- Sex Machines Museum, a sex museum in Prague, Czech Republic

== Music ==
- "Sex Machine", a song on the 1969 album Stand! by Sly and the Family Stone
- "Sex Machine", a song on the 1995 album 20 Fingers by 20 Fingers featuring Katrina
- "SexxxMachine", a song on the 2024 album Cosa Nuestra by Rauw Alejandro
- Sex Machine (album), a 1970 album by James Brown
- "Get Up (I Feel Like Being a) Sex Machine", a 1970 song by James Brown
- Live at the Sex Machine, a 1971 funk album by Kool and the Gang
- Carter the Unstoppable Sex Machine, a British indie rock band
- Sex Machineguns, a Japanese speed metal band

== Film ==
- Conviene far bene l'amore (1975), also released as The Sex Machine
- Sex Machine (1980 film), a pornographic film starring Jack Wrangler
- Sex Machine, a character in the 1996 film From Dusk till Dawn

== People ==
- Santana Sexmachine, Swedish-German drag queen

== See also ==
- Fucking Machines
