= Elizabeth Moran =

- Born: 1984 (age 41–42); Houston, Texas
- Notable work: The Armory, Record of Cherry Road

Elizabeth Moran (born 1984) is a contemporary artist born in Houston, Texas and currently lives and works in Brooklyn, New York. Within her work, she explores unseen and possibly unexplained histories, as well as capturing photographs that could be considered "unphotographable" in the modern world.[1][ ] She has created photo series examining subject matter such as porn film sets depicted without any humans present, and the exploration of supernatural activity, particularly within her mother's childhood home area. Kink.com founder Peter Acworth, who welcomed Moran into the company's studios in The Armory, spoke positively of her representations, presenting that her approach "shows that behind all the fantasy of the Kink is a world that is, in many ways, very normal." Within her work exploring supernatural behaviors, including specific nodes to nineteenth-century “spirit photography,” she received the attention of ghost hunters, who later consulted with her on the possible validity of the photographs that suspected ghosts.

Moran's work has been in both national and global exhibitions, specifically in places including Wattis Institute for Contemporary Arts in San Francisco, Headlands Center for the Arts in Sausalito, RAC Gallery in New York, Fotofest in Houston, tête in Berlin, and 72 Gallery in Tokyo. In 2014, she was included in Photo Boite's 30 Under 30: Women Photographers exhibition. A couple of her various awards include a Murphy and Cadogan Fellowship from 2012 and a Tierney Fellowship from 2013.
