= Lorelei Lee (actor) =

American performer, writer, and activist (born 1981/1982)

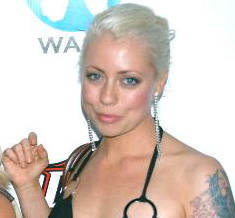
- Lee in 2006
- Born: 1981 or 1982 (age 44–45); United States
- Education: San Francisco State University; New York University (MFA); Cornell University Law School (JD)
- Occupations: Pornographic film perfomrer, writer, sex workers' rights activist

Lorelei Lee (born 1981 or 1982) is an American pornographic film performer, writer, and sex workers' rights activist. They (Note: Lee uses they/them pronouns.) hold a Master of Fine Arts degree from New York University and a juris doctor from Cornell Law School.

== Early life ==
A native of Buffalo, New York, Lee graduated from San Francisco State University in 2008. They later obtained a Master of Fine Arts degree from New York University. Lee has been awarded a National Foundation for Advancement in the Arts "youngARTS Scholarship".

== Pornographic film career ==
Lee appeared in their first pornographic film at the age of 19, inspired by their boyfriend's suggestion that people would pay to see Lee naked. Lee chose their stage name based on Marilyn Monroe's character in the 1953 film Gentlemen Prefer Blondes.

Lee starred in John Stagliano's enema-focused film Milk Nymphos, which in 2008 became the subject of a federal obscenity trial. The case reached federal court in Washington, D.C., and, on July 16, 2010, Lee was expected to testify as a witness on behalf of the defense. Citing concerns of personal safety, Lee requested to testify under their stage name; the prosecution objected, arguing that allowing them to do so "gives some air of legitimacy to the porn star" (which Lee later called "incredibly insulting") and that "they shouldn't be treated any differently than anyone else in this case". The case was ultimately dismissed on July 16, 2010, before Lee was scheduled to testify.

Hustler Magazine ranked Lee at eight on their 2011 list of the Top 10 Smartest Porn Stars.

== Mainstream media ==
In 2006, Lee wrote the centerfold text for the Sara Thrustra's Ten Pictures and Two Pin-Ups calendar. Along with fellow Kink model and director Princess Donna, Lee was the subject of Brian Lilla's 2007 independent film Tale of Two Bondage Models, which appeared at the 2008 Tribeca Film Festival. In 2008, they appeared in the documentary 9to5 – Days in Porn and also toured nationally as part of the "Sex Workers' Art Show" with other prominent members of the kink and sex-positivity community. In 2009, Lee appeared in Graphic Sexual Horror, a documentary about Insex, a now-defunct bondage website.

Later that year, they were the subject and lead actress of the short movie Lorelei Lee, which was directed by Simon Grudzen and Jesse Kerman and shown at the Big Sky Documentary Film Festival; the film received multiple awards at the Hot Docs Canadian International Documentary Festival, including Best Directing, Best Original Score and Best Use of Social Issue/Political Genre. In 2010, Lee published an essay, "I'm Leaving You" in Off the Set: Porn Stars and Their Partners, a book of documentary photography by Paul Sarkis that explores the off-screen romantic relationships of ten couples who perform in porn, and which features photos of Lorelei with their partner at the time.

Lee co-wrote the 2012 drama film About Cherry alongside director Stephen Elliott. The film is a coming-of-age story about a young woman who flees her troubled home life for San Francisco, eventually becoming a star performer for a bondage-themed pornographic website. The film premiered at the 2012 Berlin International Film Festival.

In 2012, Lee, along with adult performers Isis Love and Princess Donna, was the subject of a documentary film about the website Kink.com, Public Sex, Private Lives, which was, in part, funded by donations made to Kickstarter.

== Academic career and activism ==
As of 2016, Lee was teaching writing at New York University and at the San Francisco Center for Sex and Culture. Lee has advocated for workers' health legislation and against FOSTA-SESTA and mandatory condom use in pornographic film productions. Researcher Heather Berg describes Lee as a leading voice in sex worker policy activism.

In 2020, Lee graduated magna cum laude with a Juris Doctor from Cornell Law School and was inducted into the Order of the Coif. They also received the 2020 Stanley E. Gould Prize for Public Interest Law from the school. They became a Justice Catalyst Fellow at Cornell Law School's Gender Justice Clinic in 2021.

Lee has been a cofounder or founding member of the Disabled Sex Workers Coalition, the Upstate New York Sex Workers' Coalition, Decrim MA, and Survivors Against SESTA. Their memoir, Anything of Value: A Memoir of Sex, Work, and Survival, is pending publication by Simon & Schuster.

== Personal life ==
Lee identifies as queer and non-binary. They have been married to a trans man since 2012.

== Selected publications ==
- Cash/Consent, The War on Sex Work (2019), an extensive essay reflecting their personal experience in the pornography industry
- Anything of Value: A Memoir of Sex, Work, and Survival (pending publication by Simon & Schuster)

== Awards and nominations ==
Year	Ceremony	Result	Category	Work
2015	AVN Award	Nominated	Best Director – Parody	Barbarella: A Kinky Parody
2015	AVN Award	Nominated	Best Screenplay – Parody	Barbarella: A Kinky Parody
2015	AVN Award	Nominated	Most Outrageous Sex Scene (with Dylan Ryan)	Barbarella: A Kinky Parody
2015	AVN Award	Nominated	Best Web Director	—N/a
2015	FSC Award	Won	Woman of the Year	—N/a
