= GPW =

GPW may refer to:

- Ford GPW, an automobile
- Government Polytechnic Hindupur or Government Polytechnic For Women, Hindupur (GPW Hindupur), Hindupur, Andhra Pradesh, India
- Grand Prix Wrestling, a defunct Canadian professional wrestling
- Grand Pro Wrestling, a British professional wrestling promotion
- the Great Patriotic War (1941–1945)
- Warsaw Stock Exchange (Polish: Giełda Papierów Wartościowych w Warszawie SA)
- Gachimuchi Pants Wrestling, an internet meme and subculture that originated on the Japanese video sharing website Nico Nico Douga in 2007.

== See also ==
- Ground proximity warning system
