= Venus for Men =

Sexual stimulation machine for penises

The Venus for Men, previously sold as the Venus 2000, is a self-actuated masturbation aid for men that applies sexual stimulation using a mechanism outwardly similar to a milking machine. The machine works with or without an erection. Metro has described it as a sex toy "for the serious onanist". In addition to masturbation, the machine may also be used for orgasm control practices such as edging or forced orgasm.

== Creation ==
The Venus II was invented by Rick Gellert, with the assistance of Valentin Tsitrin, a Russian engineer. Gellert has written:

...It seems male desire for sexual activity ranges from needing an orgasm once in many weeks to wanting several in a day. [...] after hundreds of variations, I developed a product unique enough so that I was awarded patent #5501650.

The device was marketed as Venus II from October 1993 to April 1998. Gellert and Tsitrin presented their device to Abco Research Associates in 1993 (also manufacturer of the Sybian), and Abco helped them launch and market it. As a result, Abco became the primary marketer of the Venus II. In April 1997, Abco purchased the Venus II patent along with all manufacturing and marketing rights. This led to the launch of an improved version, Venus 2000.

In 2014, Abco modified the name of the product to Venus by Sybian. They also refer to the product as Venus For Men.

== Mechanics ==
The design of the device was covered by U. S. patent 5501650. It consists of a main box linked to a cylindrical "receiver" that fits over the penis by a connecting hose. The "receiver" superficially resembles the teat cup of a milking machine, and contains an inner and outer chamber separated by a cylindrical flexible rubber liner. Only the outer chamber is linked to the main box, with the inner chamber open at one end, ready for the insertion of the penis. Unlike a milking machine, the other end of the Venus 2000's inner chamber is not connected to a suction hose, but instead covered by a cap that contains a one-way valve that leads to the open air.

The main box contains a gearmotor which drives a reciprocating diaphragm. Air moves to and from the outer chamber of the "receiver" via the hose. The device works by sucking in the shaft of the user's penis when the tip is placed against the receiver's opening before activation, using the partial vacuum created by the removal of air from the inner liner via the one-way valve at the closed end of the receiver. The amount of air in the system is adjustable and determines the stroke length. Most users can adjust it to move the full length of the shaft. A significant amount of personal lubricant is needed to be added within the liner for the machine to operate correctly.

The system is controlled during operation by two small control boxes. One of them is an electrical control box, with a speed adjustment knob, attached to the main box by an electrical cable. The other is a pneumatic control box, linked by a rubber tube to the diaphragm chamber, and has two push-buttons, one to add air to the system, and the other to remove air from the system. The final adjustment possible is an internal adjustment that can be used to change the amplitude of the pumping motion, but this is not available in operation, as adjusting it requires the main box of the machine to be dismantled and reassembled.

For best operation, all the components of the "receiver" need to be sized for the penile dimensions of the user. To this end, the plastic receiver bodies are available in a variety of tube lengths and diameters, and the rubber liner material also comes in a variety of diameters.

== Specifications ==
- Dimensions: 6 inches (15 cm) high, 8 inches (20 cm) wide and 9.5 inches (24 cm) long and weighs 11 pounds (5 kg).
- Gearmotor: The unit is powered by a 1/16-horsepower (47 W) 15:1 ratio gearmotor made by Bodine Electric Co.
- Diaphragm: Air is moved by a specially designed and molded diaphragm. It has the ability to push and pull air at a high speed.
- Personalized stroke-length adjustment: The Venus 2000 has an internal adjustment point with five possible settings that controls the amount of airflow. The unit setting is based on the size of receiver used.

== See also ==
- Sex machine
- Breeding mount
