= Dylan Ryan (disambiguation) =

Dylan Ryan (born 1981) is an American pornographic actress.

Dyan Ryan may also refer to:

- Dylan Ryan (drummer) (born 1979), American drummer
- Dylan Ryan (soccer), Australian professional soccer player
