= Graphic Sexual Horror =

- Directed by: Anna Lorentzon; Barbara Bell
- Written by: Barbara Bell; Anna Lorentzon
- Produced by: Anna Lorentzon; Barbara Bell; Alex Norden
- Starring: Princess Donna; Brent Scott; Lorelei Lee; Claire Adams
- Cinematography: Anna Lorentzon
- Edited by: Anna Lorentzon; Barbara Bell
- Music by: Things Outside the Skin
- Release date: January 18, 2009 (Slamdance)
- Running time: 86 minutes
- Country: United States
- Language: English

Graphic Sexual Horror is a 2009 independent film written and directed by Anna Lorentzon and Barbara Bell in their directorial debut. The film is a documentary about Insex, a bondage website.

Graphic Sexual Horror premiered to critic and audience acclaim at Slamdance Film Festival in January 2009 and has been selected by IMDb's Arno Kazarian as the only Slamdance 2009 film reviewed in the Sundance festival's selection.

The film won Best Documentary at the 2009 CineKink Film Festival, Official Selection at the 2009 Calgary Underground Film Festival, Official Selection at the HotDocs Film Festival, Official Selection at the 2009 Buenos Aires Film Festival, Official Selection at the 2009 Fantasia International Film Festival in Montreal and Official Selection at the 2009 Athens International Film Festival in Greece.

Synapse Films announced the August 2010 release of the Special Edition DVD of Graphic Sexual Horror on June 30, 2010.

== See also ==
- Kink (film)
