= Kink (film) =

2013 American documentary film

- Directed by: Christina Voros
- Produced by: James Franco
- Release date: April 11, 2013
- Running time: 78 minutes
- Country: United States
- Language: English

Kink is a 2013 American documentary film directed by Christina Voros and produced by James Franco about the BDSM website Kink.com. The film was originally released in January 2013 and had a staggered release worldwide in 2013 and 2015.

== Early production ==
While filming scenes of About Cherry at the Kink.com San Francisco Armory, Franco noticed the dynamic between actors and the production crew. He stated that this interested him, as in some respects, it was a similar dynamic to that of the production at Saturday Night Live. It was this that led to Franco developing an interest in this aspect of the BDSM culture. After coaxing director Christina Voros to an interview at the Armory, she agreed to do the film. The other reported influence for Franco's decision to make this documentary was an unsuccessful sex tape with his girlfriend.

== People featured/appearing ==
- Peter Acworth
- Maitresse Madeline
- Chris Norris
- Van Darkholme
- Ricky Sinz
- James Deen
- Mr. Marcus
- Zoe Holiday
- Jon Jon
- Jessie Lee
- Tomcat
- Princess Donna
- Fivestar
- Francesca Le
- Phoenix Marie
- Ash Hollywood
- Remy LaCroix

== Reception ==
On Rotten Tomatoes the film has an 88% rating based on 8 reviews. On Metacritic the documentary has a score of 67 out of 100 based on reviews from 8 critics.

A review by Slant Magazine's Drew Hunt said, "More than just a thorough examination of hardcore pornography, Christina Voros’s doc is also a sort of chronicle of the filmmaking process," and also "This intriguing paradox contributes to the familiar but no less truthful idea that appearances are often deceiving; rarely is that more exhilaratingly evident than in Kink."

A 2014 article by The New York Times called the documentary a "well done in-depth look into the industry."

== See also ==
- Graphic Sexual Horror
