= Sex machine =

Mechanical devices used to simulate human sexual activity

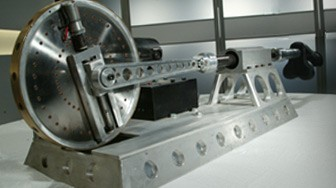
Intruder MK II, a sex machine featured on Fucking Machines

A sex machine is a mechanical device used to simulate human sexual intercourse or other sexual activity.

Devices can be penetrative or extractive. The term fucking machine is generally used to describe a penetrative machine that works by the transfer of rotational or reciprocating force from a motor to a directional motion on a shaft tipped by a dildo. A hand-held modified reciprocating saw device is sometimes called a fucksaw, a hand-held modified drill motor rotating device is sometimes called a drilldo, and a modified jigsaw is called a jillsaw. An extractive device works like a milking machine and can be attached to the penis, breast, or other body parts.

== History and use ==
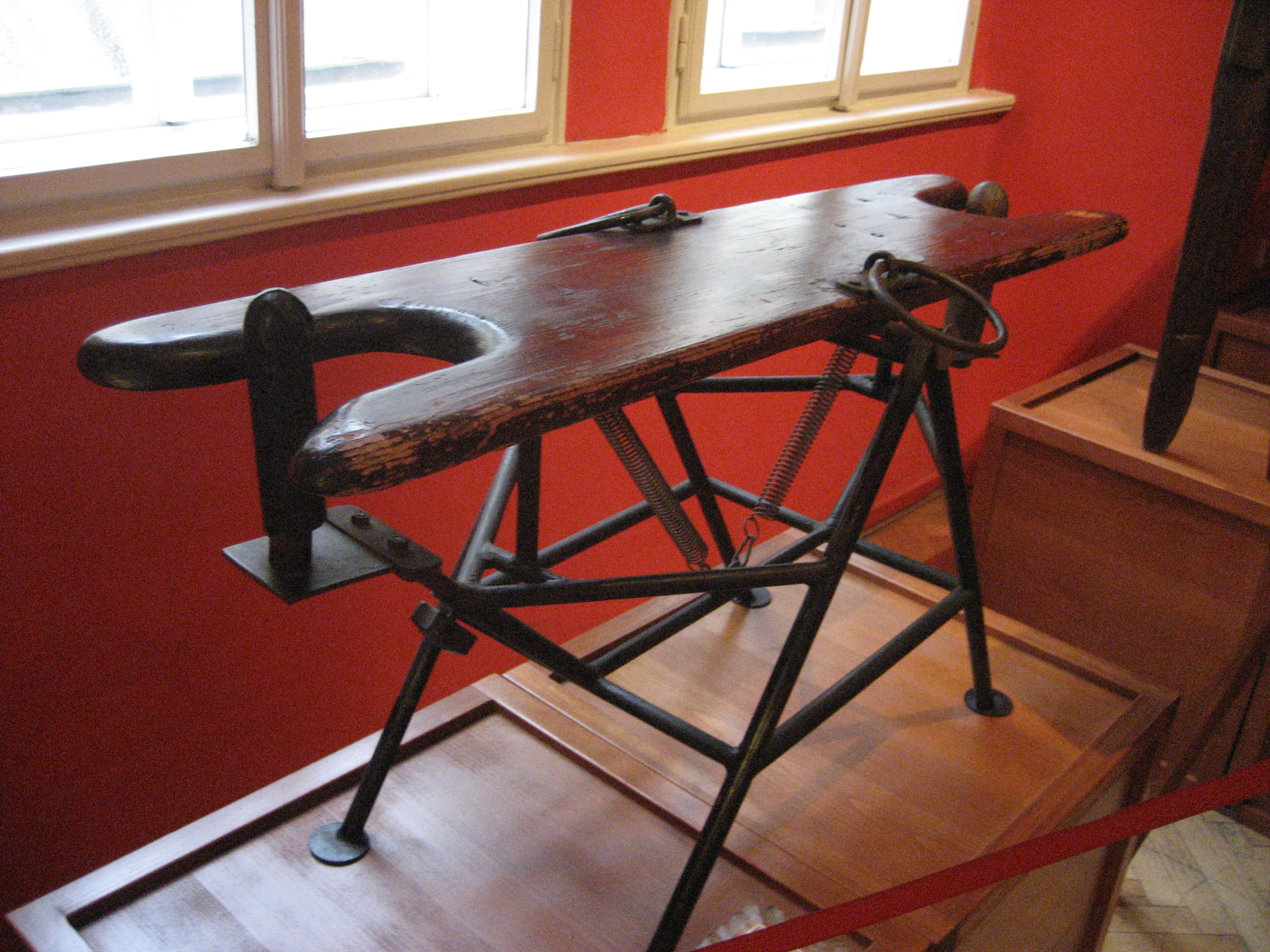
A seesaw-like device in the Sex Machines Museum in Prague

Built in 1900, the first known sex machine was a self-operated device that sprayed milk into the vagina to simulate ejaculation.

The idea that the vibrator was originally invented for the treatment of hysteria in Victorian women through medical orgasm induced by clitoral massage was put forward by historian of technology Rachel Maines, in her book The Technology of Orgasm. Maine's conjecture was popularized into a feature film. However, historians have disputed her portrayal a distortion of sources. In 2018, Hallie Lieberman and Eric Schatzberg published a peer-reviewed article that found "no evidence" to support Maines's claims in the book's citations. They called the wide acceptance of Maines's work "a fundamental failure of academic quality control". In 2020, Lieberman continued to press her case in the New York Times.

Among recent developments in teledildonics are app-controlled thrusting machines designed for remote use, produced by manufacturers such as Lovense. Modern automated erotic stimulation devices differ from vibrators because they penetrate as well as throb. These devices are sometimes used as part of autoerotic or partnered bondage play. Teledildonics combines the use of various sex machines and a web interface, controlled remotely by a partner. Modern sex machines on the market include vacuum pumps, instruments that deliver calibrated electrical shocks to the nipples and genitals, and life-size inflatable male and female dolls with penetrable and vibrating orifices.

The conference Arse Elektronika regularly features demonstrations of sex machines and academic debates about these devices.

== Risk of injury ==
In 2009, a woman from Maryland required a medical evacuation after the blade of a homemade sex machine based on a saber saw cut through the plastic dildo and caused severe vaginal injuries.

== Examples ==
- Fuckzilla (by kink.com): a sex machine featuring a dildo and a licking device (2007)
- Nekropneum Fuckenbrust Neckhammer 40k: a sex machine by the group monochrom that was featured at NRW-Forum Düsseldorf in March 2019

== In popular culture ==
In Episode 2/20 of Boston Legal, "Chitty Chitty Bang Bang," Shirley Schmitt represents a client whose Victorian erotica collection includes a "hysteria machine" (a steam-powered, piston-operated dildo) used by Victorian doctors to help women deal with their sexual needs during the Victorian Age.

In the 2008 film Burn After Reading, US Treasury agent Harry Pfarrer builds a pedal-powered "dildo chair". The pornographic website Fucking Machines has been featured in the mainstream press as a source of information and depictions of uses.

In 2011, J. Michael Bailey provided a forum for a live demonstration of a sex machine device to his class at Northwestern University, which led to international press coverage, questions about appropriate college coursework, and questions about academic freedom vis-a-vis tenure.

== See also ==
- Arse Elektronika – Recurring conference on sex and technology
- Erotic electrostimulation
- Erotic furniture
- List of BDSM equipment
- Sex toy
- Sex robot
- Sybian – Penetrative sex toy
- Venus for Men – Sexual stimulation machine for penises
- Teledildonics
