= Van Darkholme =

American performance artist and gay porn director-actor

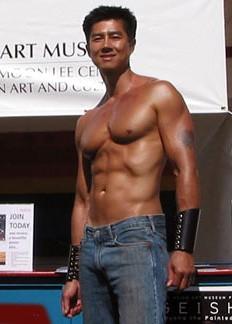
- Born: October 24, 1972 (age 54); Vietnam
- Other names: Van-sama; TDN Kosugi
- Height: 1.83 m (6 ft 0 in)
- Website: www.vandarkholme.com

Van Darkholme (born October 24, 1972) is a Vietnamese American performance artist, gay porn actor-director, and photographer. He is among the few Asian American men working in Western gay porn as a director and actor, although he primarily works in niche bondage pornography.

== Career ==
=== Before 1999: Modeling and acting ===
Van began working in a corporate job, and became a masseur to earn extra income.

He then worked as a fashion and photographic model, also pursuing photography as a hobby.

He had minor roles in the movies The Adventurers (1995), in which he played the role of Xiao Hei, leader of the San Francisco-based Vietnamese Black Tiger gang; and Who Am I? (1998), in which he played Takashi (uncredited).

=== 1999–2007: Fame and recognition in gay porn ===
Van's first porn video was TitanMen's 3 Easy Pieces, which was shot in 1999 but released in 2001; while the first to be released was Can-Am Productions' Lords of the Lockerroom (2000). Muscle Bound Productions' White Rope (2001), featuring bondage, was the first video he wrote, directed and produced.

In the documentary 101 Rent Boys (2000), that explored the lives of male prostitutes in Los Angeles, he had appeared as a "Japanese 'slavemaster' in full fetish regalia" (#90). In it he mentions that he wanted to be a movie star, but when he didn't find success, he started doing escort work and became a "dungeon master".

In just a couple of years in the gay porn industry, Van became "the world's biggest gay Asian porn star". In 2002, he attended the Nation.02 gay party in Singapore held on the occasion of National Day, and an Internet auction for "Dinner with Van" fetched $12,000— with 100% of the proceeds going to Action for AIDS (Singapore) and other development programs for the GLBT community.

Van, a shibari aficionado, started utilizing this Japanese style of tying in his bondage and photographic work in 2004. In 2006, Bruno Gmunder published a book of Darkholme's bondage photography titled Male Bondage: Art Deserves a Witness.

=== 2008–present: Kink.com and other appearances ===
After reading an article about Kink.com, Van— who had been a BDSM enthusiast since the mid-1990s— contacted the founder Peter Acworth; and in 2008, the company launched a gay bondage site named 'Bound Gods' with Darkholme as the director, under a new gay-focused division, KinkMen.com.

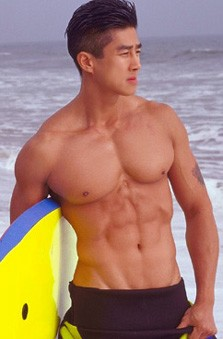
Darkholme during a photoshoot.

Van gained further recognition as a bondage master after he started working for Kink.com.

In 2009, his photographic work was featured in visual artist Trevor Wayne's self-published magazine Pin-Up Show. Paul Chan made a drawing titled Oh Van Darkholme as a part of his Sade project in the same year.

Van appeared as himself in an episode of the TV series BadComedian in 2011.

He also starred in the documentary Kink (2013) about Kink.com. In it he mentions how corporal punishment in Catholic boarding-school education planted the seed of BDSM for him, and that he grew up fantasizing about whipping the muscular football players he saw on TV. Describing his relationship as a director with models who take the submissive roles in his films, he says— "I respect and love the subs when I'm working . . . I care for them a lot."

He started streaming on Twitch in 2020, and started a YouTube channel as well.

== In popular culture ==
Van became famous in Japan as an Internet meme, after a clip from his gay porn movie Lords of the Lockerroom was posted on Nico Nico Douga in 2008. He was nicknamed VAN-sama (Japanese: VAN様) by his fans. He also had another nickname, TDN Kosugi (TDNコスギ), because his looks resembled Kazuhito Tadano (who was called TDN) and Kane Kosugi.

Deep Dark Fantasies, a 2017 visual novel about a pornstar who runs a BDSM dungeon, was inspired by fan-made mash-up videos of Darkholme posted on Nico Nico Douga. The main character Van is a loose amalgam of Van Darkholme and the characters he has played on screen. In his review, Dan Starkey from Kotaku criticized the game for misrepresenting kink.

== Personal life ==
Van was born in Vietnam and is gay. He immigrated to the US as a child, and lived in the Midwest as a farm boy, before moving to Los Angeles.

== See also ==
- List of actors in gay pornographic films
- Gachimuchi
