= Naked Ambition =

Naked Ambition may refer to:

== Films ==
- Naked Ambition (2003 film), a Hong Kong sex comedy film
  - Naked Ambition 2, aka 3D Naked Ambition; 2014 sequel to the 2003 film
- Naked Ambition: An R Rated Look at an X Rated Industry, a 2007 documentary and 2007 photobook
- Naked Ambition: Women Who Are Changing the Porn Industry, a 2005 non-fiction book by Carly Milne
- Madonna: Naked Ambition, 2000 British telefilm by Angus Cameron
- Naked Ambition, a 2023 documentary film about the career of Bunny Yeager, pinup model and photographer.

== Television ==
- "Naked Ambition", episode 2 from series 1 of Faith in the Future
- "Naked Ambition", episode 15 from season 4 of King of the Hill
- "Naked Ambition", episode 9 from season 2 of the U.S. edition of Make Me a Supermodel
- "Naked Ambition", episode 2 from season 1 of Face Off
