= Automated erotic stimulation device =

Automated erotic stimulation device may refer to:

- Sex machine
- Vibrator (sex toy)
