= Steve Holmes (actor) =

German pornographic actor

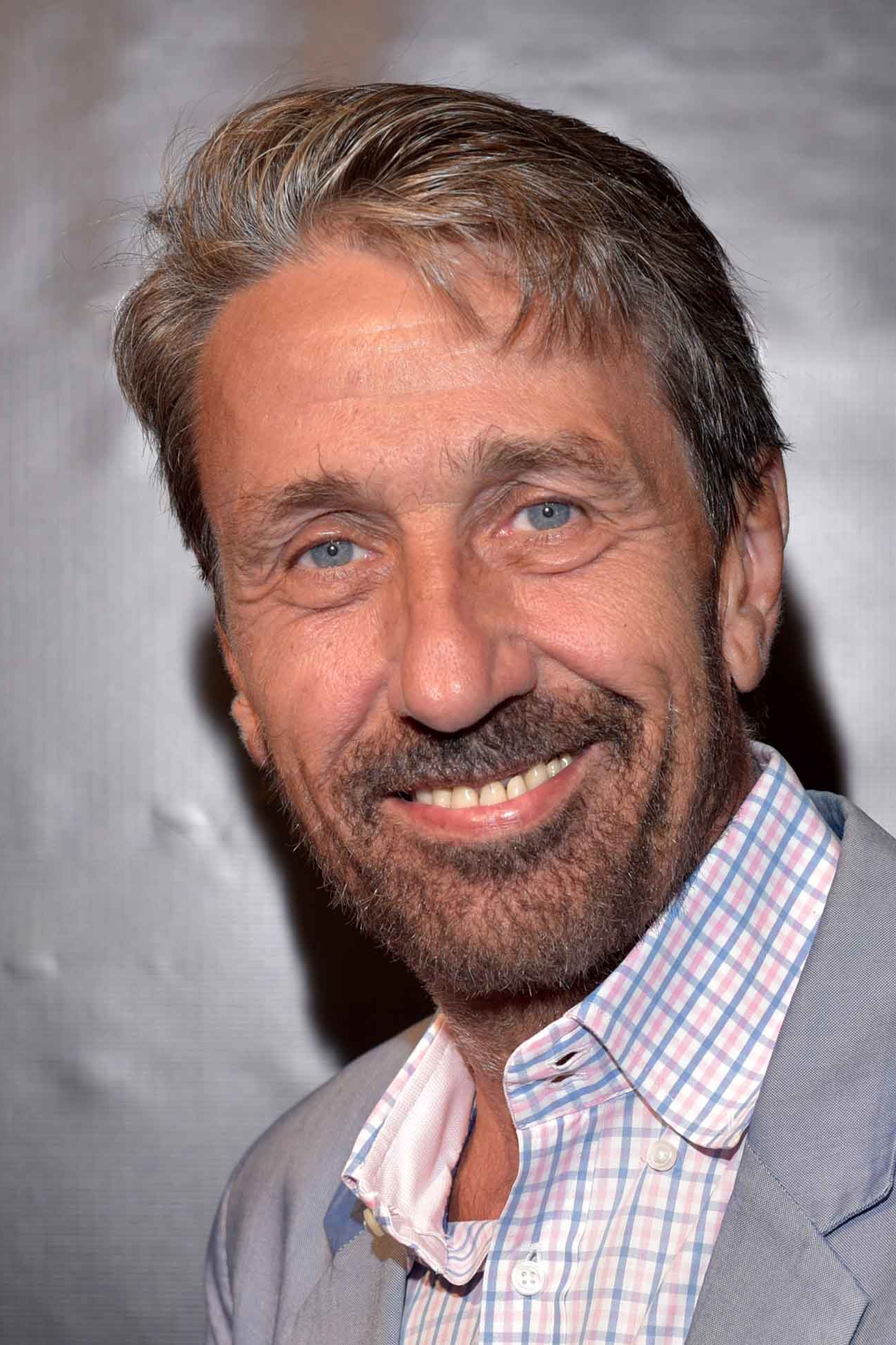
- Holmes in 2019
- Born: 23 March 1961 (age 65); Sibiu, Romania
- Occupation: Pornographic actor
- Years active: 1996–present
- Spouse: Sylvia

YouTube information
- Channel: Steve Holmes
- Genre: Vlog
- Subscribers: 100 thousand
- Views: 40 million
- Last updated: 26 April 2025

Steve Holmes (born 23 March 1961) is a German pornographic actor, producer and director. He has received several adult industry awards, including the AVN Award for Male Foreign Performer of the Year in 2005 and 2006. In 2017, Holmes was inducted into the AVN Hall of Fame.

== Early life ==
Holmes was born to Transylvanian Saxon parents in Sibiu, Romania. In the summer of 1968, while on holiday in Bulgaria, Holmes and his family crossed the Turkish border. Upon arrival at the German Embassy in Istanbul, they sought political asylum. Holmes eventually returned to Romania to visit family.

After dropping out of school, Holmes began working in fashion. He eventually became an assistant buyer for several clothing stores. While attending a computer show in Munich, he decided to enter the tech industry. On 1 January 1986, Holmes started working as a sales representative for an IT company. He continued to work in the tech industry for several years.

== Career ==
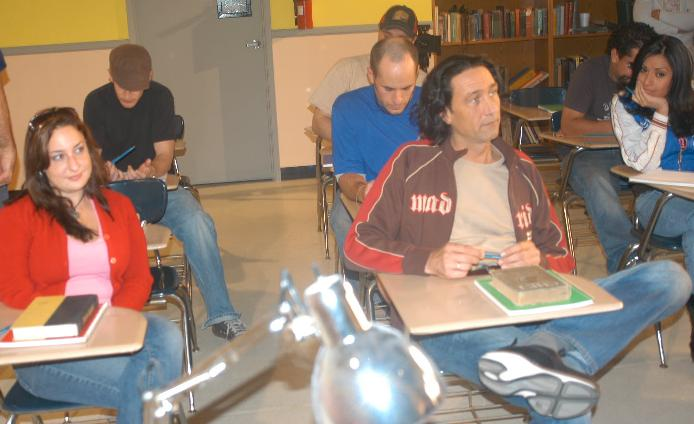
Holmes (front right) on set for the film Da Vinci Load

Holmes spent most of 1996 attempting to break into the adult film industry with little success. Prior to performing in porn, Holmes sought permission from his wife. On 22 November 1996, he performed in his first pornographic scene in Dortmund, Germany. The scene was part of an amateur series called Have a Wish. Holmes wasn't compensated for the shoot. While giving an interview, he was instructed by a reporter to adopt the stage name "Steve Holmes" due to his similar appearance to that of actor John Holmes.

In 2001, Holmes won the NINFA Award for Best Supporting Actor at the Barcelona International Erotic Film Festival. That same year, he met Manuel Ferrara on a shoot for Rocco Siffredi. After hitting it off, the two went on to produce the film series Euro Girls Never Say No and The Pussy Is Not Enough. In 2003, Holmes performed in over 280 scenes. That same year, Holmes became one of five charter directors for Platinum X Pictures; other notable directors included Jewel De'Nyle, Michael Stefano and Ferrara.

In 2004, Holmes received the XRCO Award for Unsung Swordsman. He also received the AVN Award for Male Foreign Performer of the Year for two consecutive years in 2005 and 2006. In 2006, Holmes signed a directing deal with Mach 2 Entertainment to direct one film a month. In late 2007, he performed in his first scene featuring bondage for Kink.com. He developed the site Public Disgrace with fellow performer Princess Donna. In May 2020, Holmes launched his own website, which features an archive of over 3,000 scenes he's performed in throughout his career.

== Personal life ==
In 2017, Holmes and his wife celebrated 26 years of marriage. He currently resides in California. He is close friends with directors Greg Lansky and Mike Adriano.

While shooting a scene for Public Disgrace in Barcelona, Holmes and Princess Donna were arrested by local authorities. The two were released shortly after.

== Awards ==
List of accolades received by Steve Holmes
Awards and nominations
Award	Won	Nominated
AVN Awards	10	33
F.A.M.E. Awards	0	1
NightMoves Awards	0	3
NINFA Awards	1	0
XBIZ Awards	3	8
XRCO Awards	3	4
- Total number of wins and nominations
Totals	17	56

AVN Awards
Year	Nominated work and artist	Category	Result	Ref.
2003	Funky Fetish Horror Show	Best Actor (Video)	Nominated	
2004	Katsumi's Affair	Best Sex Scene in a Foreign-Shot Production	Won	
2004	Acid Dreams	Best Couples Sex Scene – Video	Nominated	
2004	2 Dicks in 1 Chick 2	Best Three-Way Sex Scene – Video	Nominated	
2004	Mason's Dirty Trixxx 2	Best Three-Way Sex Scene – Video	Nominated	
2005	Gilvert 5	Best Anal Sex Scene	Nominated	
2005	The Pussy Is Not Enough 2	Best Three-Way Sex Scene	Nominated	
2005	Steve Holmes	Male Foreign Performer of the Year	Won	
2006	Steve Holmes	Male Foreign Performer of the Year	Won	
2006	Cum Guzzlers 4	Best Three-Way Sex Scene	Nominated	
2006	Sex Fiends 2	Best Three-Way Sex Scene	Nominated	
2007	Outnumbered 4	Best Sex Scene in a Foreign-Shot Production	Won	
2008	Fashionistas Safado: Berlin	Best Group Sex Scene	Nominated	
2008	Rich Little Bitch	Best Group Sex Scene	Nominated	
2008	Slutty and Sluttier 3	Best Group Sex Scene	Nominated	
2009	Butthole Whores 2	Best Anal Sex Scene	Nominated	
2010	Ass Worship 11	Best Group Sex Scene	Nominated	
2010	Steve Holmes	Male Foreign Performer of the Year	Nominated	
2011	Bra Busters	Best Double-Penetration Sex Scene	Nominated	
2011	Tori Black Nymphomaniac	Best Sex Scene in a Foreign-Shot Production	Won	
2012	Anal Fanatic 2	Best Double-Penetration Scene	Nominated	
2012	Bad Girls 5	Best Double-Penetration Scene	Nominated	
2012	Bra Busters 2	Best Double-Penetration Scene	Nominated	
2012	Savanna Samson Is the Masseuse	Best Supporting Actor	Nominated	
2013	Anal Boot Camp	Best Double Penetration Sex Scene	Nominated	
2013	Anal Invitation	Best Double Penetration Sex Scene	Nominated	
2013	Voracious	Best Supporting Actor	Nominated	
2013	Asa Akira To the Limit	Most Outrageous Sex Scene	Nominated	
2014	I Am Asa Akira 2	Best Double Penetration Sex Scene	Nominated	
2014	Savannah's Secret	Best Sex Scene in a Foreign-Shot Production	Nominated	
2015	Climax	Best Anal Sex Scene	Nominated	
2016	Ass Worship 16	Best Double Penetration Sex Scene	Nominated	
2017	One I Lust	Best Actor	Nominated	
2017	My DP	Best Double Penetration Sex Scene	Nominated	
2017	Flesh Hunter 13	Best Group Sex Scene	Nominated	
2017	One I Lust	Best Three-Way Sex Scene – B/B/G	Nominated	
2017	Steve Holmes	Hall of Fame Inductee	Won	
2017	MILFs, Old Men and Young Whores	Most Outrageous Sex Scene	Nominated	
2020	Angela White: Dark Side	Best Gangbang Scene	Won	
2021	The Insatiable Emily Willis	Best Double-Penetration Sex Scene	Won	
2021	Move Over, Linda Blair	Most Outrageous Sex Scene	Won	
2023	Gianna 4 You	Best Tag-Team Sex Scene	Won	

F.A.M.E. Awards
Year	Nominated work and artist	Category	Result	Ref.
2007	Steve Holmes	Favorite Male Star	Nominated	

NightMoves Awards
Year	Nominated work and artist	Category	Result	Ref.
2019	Steve Holmes	Best Actor	Nominated	
2020	Steve Holmes	Best Male Performer	Nominated	
2022	Steve Holmes	Best Male Actor	Nominated	

NINFA Awards
Year	Nominated work and artist	Category	Result	Ref.
2001	Eternal Love	Best Supporting Actor	Won	

XBIZ Awards
Year	Nominated work and artist	Category	Result	Ref.
2012	Steve Holmes	Foreign Male Performer of the Year	Nominated	
2013	Steve Holmes	Foreign Male Performer of the Year	Nominated	
2014	I Am Asa Akira 2	Best Sex Scene – Non-Feature Release	Nominated	
2015	V for Vicki	Best Sex Scene – Non-Feature Release	Nominated	
2017	Sexbots: Programmed For Pleasure	Best Sex Scene – Feature Release	Nominated	
2018	Pump My Ass Full of Cum 4	Best Sex Scene – Gonzo Release	Nominated	
2018	Anal Savages 2	Best Sex Scene – Gonzo Release	Nominated	
2018	Stags & Vixens	Best Sex Scene – Vignette Release	Nominated	
2018	Steve Holmes	Foreign Male Performer of the Year	Won	
2019	Dirty Grandpa	Best Actor – Comedy Release	Nominated	
2019	Dirty Grandpa	Best Sex Scene – Comedy Release	Nominated	
2019	My Dad, Your Dad	Best Sex Scene – Taboo Release	Nominated	
2019	Joanna Angel Gangbang: As Above, So Below	Best Sex Scene – Taboo Release	Nominated	
2019	Steve Holmes	Foreign Male Performer of the Year	Won	
2019	Steve Holmes	XBIZ Legacy Award	Won	
2020	Ministry of Evil	Best Actor – Taboo-Themed Release	Nominated	
2020	Ministry of Evil	Best Sex Scene – Taboo-Themed	Nominated	
2020	Slut Puppies 14	Best Sex Scene – Gonzo	Nominated	
2021	ThanksSwinging Day	Best Sex Scene – Virtual Reality	Nominated	

XRCO Awards
Year	Nominated work and artist	Category	Result	Ref.
2004	Steve Holmes	Unsung Swordsman	Won	
2004	Mason's Dirty Tricks	Best Three-Way Sex Scene	Won	
2017	One I Lust	Best Actor	Nominated	
2019	Steve Holmes	Hall of Fame	Won	
2020	Steve Holmes	Male Performer of the Year	Nominated	
2020	Steve Holmes	Unsung Swordsman of the Year	Nominated	
2021	Steve Holmes	Male Performer of the Year	Nominated	
