= Mechanophilia =

Sexual attraction to machines

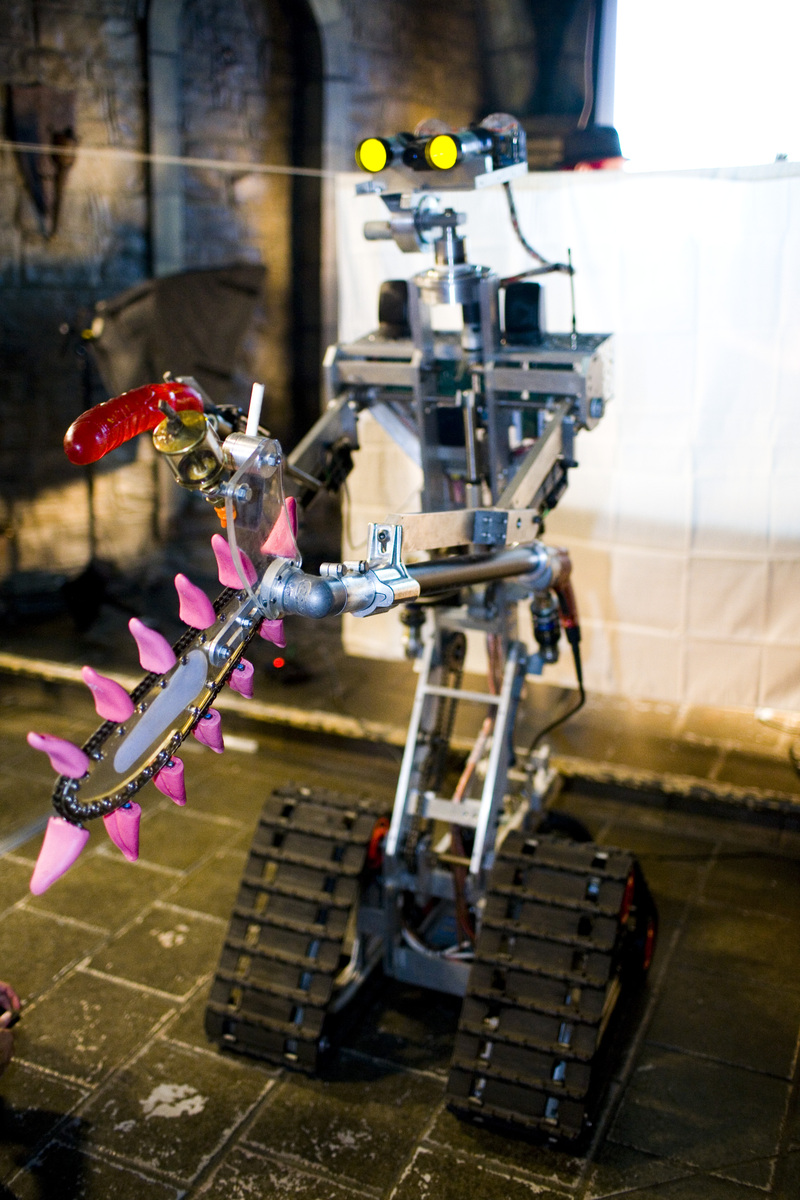
A mechanophilic creation that simulates oral and penetrative sex, showcased at Arse Elektronika in 2007.

Mechanophilia (or mechaphilia) is a paraphilia involving a sexual attraction to machines. These may also include transportation machinery such as bicycles, motorcycles, cars, helicopters, and airplanes.

Mechanophilia is treated as a crime in some nations with perpetrators being placed on a sex-offenders' register after prosecution. Motorcycles are often portrayed as sexualized fetish objects to those who desire them. Milimechanophilia denotes attraction specifically to military vehicles.

== Art, culture and design ==
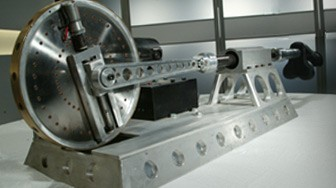
Intruder MK II, a sex machine featured on Fucking Machines

Mechanophilia has been used to describe important works of the early modernists, including in the Eccentric Manifesto (1922), written by Leonid Trauberg, Sergei Yutkevich, Grigori Kozintsev and others – members of the Factory of the Eccentric Actor, a modernist avant-garde movement that spanned Russian futurism and constructivism.

The term has entered into the realms of science fiction and popular fiction.

Scientifically, in Biophilia – The Human Bond with Other Species by Edward O. Wilson, Wilson is quoted describing mechanophilia, the love of machines, as "a special case of biophilia", whereas psychologists such as Erich Fromm would see it as a form of necrophilia.

Designers such as Francis Picabia and Filippo Tommaso Marinetti have been said to have exploited the sexual attraction of automobiles.

Culturally, critics have described it as "all-pervading" within contemporary Western society and that it seems to overwhelm our society and all too often our better judgment. Although not all such uses are sexual in intent, the terms are also used for specifically erotogenic fixation on machinery and taken to its extreme in hardcore pornography as Fucking Machines. This mainly involves women being sexually penetrated by machines for male consumption, which are seen as being the limits of current sexual biopolitics.

Arse Elektronika, an annual conference organized by the Austrian arts-and-philosophy collective monochrom, has propagated a DIY/feminist approach to sex machines.

Authors have drawn a connection between mechanophilia and masculine militarisation, citing the works of animator Yasuo Ōtsuka and Studio Ghibli.

The 1973 French film La Grande Bouffe includes a scene of a man and a car copulating, to fatal effect.

David Cronenberg's 1996 film Crash concerns a cult of people fascinated by car crashes.

The 2021 French film and Palme d'Or winner Titane depicts scenes of a mechanophilic woman having sex with cars.

== Incidents ==
In 2015 a man in Thailand was caught on CCTV masturbating himself on the front end of a Porsche.

In 2008, an American man named Edward Smith admitted to 'having sex' with 1000 cars, and the helicopter used in the television show Airwolf.

== Documentaries ==
- My Car Is My Lover (2008)

== See also ==
- Gynoid
- Object sexuality
- I'm in Love with My Car
- Sex robot
