= 101 Rent Boys =

- Film poster
- Directed by: Fenton Bailey; Randy Barbato
- Produced by: Fenton Bailey; Randy Barbato
- Cinematography: Sandra Chandler
- Edited by: William Grayburn
- Distributed by: Strand Releasing
- Release date: June 7, 2000 (San Francisco International Lesbian and Gay Film Festival)
- Running time: 78 minutes
- Country: United States
- Language: English

101 Rent Boys is a 2000 documentary film that explores the lives of male prostitutes in the Los Angeles, California area. Created by film-makers Randy Barbato and Fenton Bailey, the film depicts 101 hustlers, being paid each $50 for their time, which come from diverse ethnic, regional, and economic backgrounds. Picked up on and around Santa Monica Boulevard, the men discuss a variety of things, many referring to their personal history as well as commenting on the nature of their work.

== Background and film contents ==
Filmmakers Randy Barbato and Fenton Bailey had earlier created the independent films The Eyes of Tammy Faye and Party Monster. While the two previous films covered different topics, the cinematography and general style are the same as in 101 Rent Boys. Each man interviewed is paid $50 for his time, and they were picked up on and around Santa Monica Boulevard.

The interviewees discuss a variety of aspects about the U.S. prostitution trade itself such as their individual physical selling-points, attitudes held toward customers, and sexual turn-ons/offs. Self-identity and sexual orientation come up, with several of the men being "gay for pay". Personal life challenges such as substance abuse and periods of homelessness are talked about as well. Several were molested as children; some men mention feelings of depression and segregation, such as one interviewee describing using drugs "to deal with the fact that" he's "using intimacy as a commodity". However, others protest the characterization as hurting or being made dirty. Each hustler has a large card that describes the number with which he got assigned during the film-making.

Additional examples of subjects broached include a Latino rent boy being a former gang member, Van Darkholme who is a performance artist dressed in heavily fetishist regalia operating in the BDSM scene, and a prostitute who is transsexual. While the outfits worn and states of dress vary from person to person, nudity briefly occurring, the film itself contains no sexual activity.

== Reviews and responses ==
Variety ran a mixed review by film critic Dennis Harvey, who argued that the men interviewed "are there more to be tallied than truly fathomed." He stated that the film's creators "deliver a slick, fussily stylized package that leaves no room for boredom" but should have delved more into the lives of the interviewees, with fewer hustlers being involved. However, Harvey considered several moments rather "memorable", citing for example a prostitute's description of a parent dying of a heroin overdose that went into detail about "feeling my soul float away" as a result.

A brief mentioning of the film by the Chicago Reader described it as "gritty" and remarked on the frankness of the comments made by the hustlers. The film has received condemnation in the pages of the Encyclopedia of Prostitution and Sex Work, with 101 Rent Boys labeled in the book's first volume as being "an exploitative look" at the subject rather than an honest one. The book asserted that the overall style of the film gets set up in such a way as to "reduce the men to parodies". The works Chicken Ranch (1983) and Fetishes (1996) were highlighted as a contrast.

== Releases ==
The film came out on the broadcast network Cinemax in August 2000.

101 Rent Boys was released on Region 1 DVD on June 26, 2001. The DVD release has a feature where each of the interview subjects were left alone with the camera for five minutes to do whatever they choose. In this feature, several participants masturbate.

== See also ==
- Chicken Ranch
- Prostitution in the United States
