= Regina Lynn =

American journalist (born 1971)

Regina Lynn (born May 17, 1971) is an American columnist, blogger, author, and self-described sex-tech expert. Her work discusses the convergence of sex and technology, touching on subjects ranging from teledildonics and online dating to social media, video games, and cybersex.

== Authorship ==
=== "Sex Drive" ===
She wrote the "Sex Drive" column weekly from 2003 to 2007 and biweekly in 2008. "Sex Drive" was an opinion column that attempted to use humor and a personal voice to make sex-tech more accessible to a mainstream audience. In her chapter of the anthology Naked Ambition: Women Who Are Changing Porn, she described her mission to provide a counterpoint to the fear of sex and technology emphasized in the mainstream media:

The mainstream media seems to focus on the fear. I’ve seen so much written about Internet infidelity, pedophiles using chat rooms to lure kids out to piers, CEOs and priests with porn on their hard drives. I don’t ignore this, nor do I pretend it’s not happening. People do bad stuff with sex-tech. Yet we have so many ways in which technology enhances our relationships. That’s where I go with Sex Drive. I like to focus on the individual even if I’m writing about society-wide implications. Here’s how I use a particular technology, or here’s how so-and-so uses it. And here’s how you can use it, too.

The "Sex Drive" column began as a companion to the 13 episodes in the Wired for Sex documentary series on TechTV, and then continued on TechTV.com for a year before moving to Wired.com in August 2004.

"Sex Drive" commented on current events such as obscenity lawsuits, teachers losing their jobs due to their online sexual expression, and the impact of webcam-savvy women on traditional porn studios. The column also profiled engineers, inventors, and other people who were driving the technology of sex in new ways. Subjects ranged from the prototype of the OhMiBod vibrator, the motors of which react to the sound waves coming from an MP3 player, to the rudiments of artificial intelligence in sex toys, to art installations such as The Human Body Project, which chronicled what human beings look like in natural and unnatural permutations.

Robert Bloomfield and Benjamin Duranske cited two of Lynn's columns in their paper "Protecting Children in Virtual Worlds Without Undermining Their Economic, Educational, and Social Benefits," published in the Washington and Lee Law Review volume 66-3. The columns referenced are "Motion-Capture Suits Will Spice Up Virtual Sex" and "Second Life Gets Sexier".

Lynn often attempted to wrap her social commentary in humor. In "The 10 Real Reasons Why Geeks Make Better Lovers", Lynn tried to counter the stereotype that "computer nerds" were too socially inept to have relationships. This column made a big impact on Wired readers and was plagiarized on hundreds of technology-related blogs and websites. In "The 10 Reasons I'd Rather Marry a Robot", she provided a counterpoint to the assertions about the future of artificial intelligence and human relationships made by author David Levy in his book Love and Sex with Robots: The Evolution of Human-Robot Relationships (Harper, 2007).

One of the themes that runs through her work is that technology offers people the opportunity to explore sexuality and to learn about themselves at their own pace, without the shame or fear imposed by cultural inhibitions or standards. In "You Duly Have My Permission", she reframed the argument that technology lowers sexual inhibitions as a benefit, not a danger. She opened the column with

"You're the perfect person to grant permission," my friend tells me, "for the exact reason that you don't get why people ask for it." She went on to write "...it occurred to me with new clarity that most sex columns are also advice columns. Mine is not....But [radio and television] hosts are used to the idea of standard sex advice columnists. They book me on the show because they like the tech angle, but they don't always know quite what to do with me..." Finally, she observed that "Usually, what [people are] looking for is not really advice, but permission." She concludes that while "permission has to come from within," she was willing to provide "external guidelines" for people who want outside permission until the "develop the confidence to create their own internal framework."

Not all "Sex Drive" columns were funny or personal. In "Don't Dismiss Online Relationships As Fantasy", Lynn used three disparate news stories to make a serious point. One story was about a man who committed murder out of jealousy over his online lover, reported in Wired magazine. Another was about a marriage endangered by disagreements over the husband's involvement in the virtual world Second Life, reported in the Wall Street Journal. Another was about an MIT study that contrasted the precautions women took before their first date with someone they met online, such as meeting in a public place and arranging a check-in call with a friend, with the high percentage of women who had sexual intercourse on that first date but did not use a condom, reported in the Houston Chronicle.

After commenting on each news story, Lynn wrote:

For all that I have broadened my horizons since the first Sex Drive column more than four years ago, I have yet to encounter anything that challenges my core belief: Relationships are real wherever they form. That's why we're so desperate to pretend it's all fantasy if it's online, so we can make the hard, painful, life-crushing parts go away. And that's why I get my panties in a bunch when people try to dismiss the reality of sex in virtual spaces. I'm all for cybersex, of course, but let's not pretend it doesn't have real consequences."

=== Other works ===
In addition to writing the "Sex Drive" column, Lynn blogged about sex and technology for almost two years for Wired Blogs Sex Drive Daily and briefly recorded a weekly "Sex Drive" podcast for Wired podcasts. In 2008, she appeared weekly on Playboy Radio's Afternoon Advice with Tiffany Granath, discussing current sex-tech news with host Tiffany Granath.

Lynn is the author of The Sexual Revolution 2.0, which analyzes how the information age is changing courtship, romance, and sex. She also authored Sexier Sex: Lessons from a Brave New Sexual Frontier, a collection of ideas intended to inspire people to explore their sexuality though technology. The suggestions range from solo activities to role-playing in virtual worlds to ways to deepen intimacy and connection for partners who are already dating, living together, or in a long-distance relationship. She also contributed an essay to the anthology Naked Ambition: Women Who Are Changing Pornography, edited by Carly Milne. She describes her feature story "The History of Vibrators" (Adult Video News, July 2009)as "one of the best features I've ever written."

Lynn's first published erotica short story, "A Game of Passion", was published in an e-book anthology called Tentacle Dreams.. This story continues the sex-tech theme by portraying two people who became lovers via motion-capture suits and an online role-playing game, who are now meeting in person for the first time.

== Recognition ==
Lynn won a Maggie award from the Western Publications Association for "Best Regularly Featured Web Column." She has appeared several documentaries about sex and technology, including Vanguard: Porn 2.0 by Christof Putzel and Wired for Sex on G4TV. She participated in the "open source" online documentary Digital Tipping Point by Christian Einfeldt. Her column "Rude People, Not Tech, Cause Bad Manners" was reprinted as "The New Communication Technology: A Challenge to Modern Relationships?" in the college textbook America Now: Short Readings from Recent Periodicals, Eighth Edition, edited by Robert Atwan. The America Now textbook series compiles "the best writing on today’s hottest issues" as models for college students in composition, journalism, creative writing, and English courses.

Marie Claire magazine named Lynn one of the top five leading sex experts in the United States.

== Personal life ==
While writing "Sex Drive" and her two books, she divided her time between Los Angeles and San Francisco. In 2008, Lynn retired "Sex Drive" and moved out of the city. She now resides in Nevada County, California. She blogs about sex-tech and continues to speak on the subject at conferences and in the media.

== Bibliography ==
- Lynn, Regina (2005). The Sexual Revolution 2.0. Ulysses Press. ISBN 1-56975-477-2.
- Milne, Carly; Laura Leui; Jill Sieracki; Violet Blue; Regina Lynn; Jayme Waxman; Lisa Massaro (2005-09-22). Naked Ambition: Women Who Are Changing Pornography. Carroll & Graf Publishers. ISBN 0-7867-1590-1.
- Lynn, Regina (April 2008). Sexier Sex: Lessons from the Brave New Sexual Frontier. Seal Press. ISBN 978-1-58005-231-3.
- Reed, Nobilis; Regina Lynn; Michele Bekemeyer; Monocle; Rosie Q; Ed Magusson; Albert Herring (October 2010). Tentacle Dreams. Republica Press. ISBN 978-1-926830-29-2.
