= Billy Herrington =

American pornographic actor and Japanese internet icon (1969–2018)

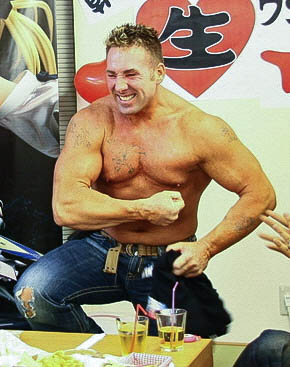
- Herrington in Tokyo in 2011
- Born: William Glen Harold Herrington; July 14, 1969; North Babylon, New York, U.S.
- Died: March 2, 2018 (aged 48); Palm Springs, California, U.S.
- Resting place: Forest Lawn Cemetery
- Years active: 1998–2018
- Height: 6 ft 1 in (1.85 m)
- Children: 1

William Glen Harold Herrington (July 14, 1969 – March 2, 2018), was an American model, body builder and pornographic film actor. In the late 2000s, his appearances in various gay pornography movies led him to become a popular Internet meme on video-sharing websites such as Japan's Nico Nico Douga, where he was referred to by the sobriquet "Aniki" (兄貴; lit. "older brother"). Since then, at least 15,000 short mash-up parodies of his clips—known as "Gachimuchi Pants Wrestling" (Japanese: ガチムチパンツレスリング, Hepburn: Gachimuchi Pantsu Resuringu, lit. "Beefy Briefs Wrestling")—have been produced by users.

== Early life and career ==
Herrington was born in North Babylon, New York. Herrington grew up in Long Island learning karate from his father, a sensei. He had interests in boxing, wrestling and martial arts, and started bodybuilding at 24 years old, after moving to New York City.

Herrington began his erotic career when his then girlfriend surreptitiously submitted his nude pictures to Playgirl magazine. The photographs won him a "Real Men of the Month" contest and a $500 prize. His appearance in the magazine caught the eye of famed photographer Jim French, but it was two years before Herrington posed for his first Colt calendars for French. Soon after, Herrington was filming hardcore gay adult films for All Worlds Video, and appearing on mainstream TV programs such as Love Connection and the Ricki Lake talk show. In 2002, Herrington said the adult film industry helped him to understand his bisexuality. Occasionally, Herrington performed striptease acts at gay clubs in the United States.

== Internet meme ==
Herrington gained fame in Japan as an Internet meme, after a clip from one of his movies, Workout: Muscle Fantasies 3, was posted on Nico Nico Douga, a Japanese video sharing website, on August 10, 2007. At least 15,000 mash-up parody videos of him have been made, many of which utilize deliberate mishearings (soramimi) of lines from his films, most notably from Workout: Muscle Fantasies 3 and Lords of the Lockerroom.

Herrington is affectionately called "Pants Wrestling Aniki" (パンツレスリングの兄貴, lit. pants wrestling older brother) or "Aniki" (兄貴; lit. older brother) among the Nico Nico Douga community. Most of his videos are deliberately mistagged with "Wrestling Series" (レスリングシリーズ, resuringu shirīzu), "Forest Fairy" (森の妖精, mori no yōsei), "Philosophy" (哲学, tetsugaku), or all three.

In February 2009, Herrington visited Japan to attend a live online event hosted by Nico Nico Douga and garage kit maker Good Smile Company. Herrington said that he was flattered and humbled by his fans' creativity. A limited-edition Herrington action figure was announced for a July 2009 release. Two other limited-edition Herrington action figures were announced for the Halloween and Christmas holiday. The Halloween figure was released in October 2009 and the Christmas one was released in December 2009. Both are Nico Nico Chyokuhan exclusives.

== Death ==
During the evening of March 1, 2018, Herrington was involved in a car accident on California State Route 111 in Rancho Mirage. He was found trapped in the wreckage and was brought to a Palm Springs hospital, where he died the next day. News broke of his death one day later. Fans responded with hundreds of tributes across video sharing sites and message boards. One tribute video uploaded on Nico Nico Douga accumulated over 80,000 views in less than one week. Services for Herrington were held at the Forest Lawn Cemetery in Cathedral City, California.

== Legacy ==
Herrington gained fame in Japan as an Internet meme and visited the country due to his popularity there. As of March 2018, over 15,000 Gachimuchi Pants Wrestling videos had been uploaded on Nico Nico Douga alone.

In the autumn of 2021, a resident of Zaporizhzhia published a petition proposing that the city council rename Mayakovsky Square in honor of Billy Herrington, justifying the proposal by noting that, in addition to the square, the city has a park and an alley named after the poet, and the renaming could attract tourists. He also mentioned that Herrington has a large fanbase in Ukraine and neighboring countries. The petition gathered 805 signatures but was rejected. In July 2022, in Ukraine, a petition to the President of Ukraine from an Odesa resident, proposing to replace the monument to Russian Empress Catherine II with a statue of American pornographic actor Billy Herrington as part of the derussification in Ukraine, gathered over 25,000 signatures. Volodymyr Zelenskyy responded to the petition, asking the Odesa City Council to discuss the removal of the monument, in accordance with local self-government laws.

== See also ==
- List of male performers in gay porn films
