= Dave Lampert =

American businessman, inventor of the Sybian

David Lee Lampert (October 14, 1930 – June 24, 2021) was an American sex toy pioneer.

He studied agriculture at the University of Illinois, before becoming a dance instructor after graduation.

Lampert invented the Sybian in an attempt to mitigate what he saw as an unfair shortcoming in women's sexual pleasure. He developed it in conjunction with a medical doctor, and tested it with women and their partners at swingers' groups.

His company Abco Research Associates was responsible for the sale of both the Sybian, his own invention, and the Venus 2000, for which it had manufacturing rights. He lived in Monticello, Illinois, where he manufactured the Sybian and Venus 2000 as a family business.

In 2010, Lampert appeared on the Howard Stern Show with the actress Raven Alexis, who demonstrated the Sybian in action.

Lampert received a lifetime achievement award from AVN magazine in 2016 for his work.

Lampert died in 2021, at the age of 90.
