= About Cherry =

- Directed by: Stephen Elliott
- Written by: Lorelei Lee; Stephen Elliott
- Produced by: Gordon Bijelonic; Elizabeth Destro; Chris Kientz; Jordan Kessler; Rick Dugdale
- Starring: Ashley Hinshaw; Lili Taylor; Dev Patel; Jonny Weston; James Franco; Heather Graham
- Cinematography: Darren Genet
- Edited by: Michelle Botticelli
- Music by: Jeff Russo
- Distributed by: IFC Films
- Release dates: February 2012 (Berlin International Film Festival); September 21, 2012 (International)
- Running time: 102 minutes
- Country: United States
- Language: English
- Box office: $8,315

About Cherry is a 2012 American drama film and the directorial debut of Stephen Elliott. It is based on a script written by Elliott and porn industry veteran Lorelei Lee. It stars Ashley Hinshaw, James Franco, Heather Graham, and Dev Patel. The project was filmed in San Francisco and premièred at the 2012 Berlin International Film Festival.

== Plot ==
Angelina is an 18-year-old girl not far from graduating from high school. Her boyfriend Bobby suggests that she should take naked pictures of herself and sell them. She is initially hesitant, but eventually does the photo shoot and uses the money to run away to San Francisco with her best friend Andrew. At a strip club party in the city, Angelina meets a wealthy lawyer named Francis, who offers to introduce her to a glamorous world of expensive dresses and lavish parties. Angelina also meets Margaret, a former porn star turned adult film director. Margaret offers Angelina, now using the porn name Cherry, direction in her entry into the San Francisco porn industry. Angelina makes several soft pornography films before deciding to do a hardcore film. After Angelina shoots the film, an angry Francis chastises her before getting them in a car accident. Angelina returns home to find Andrew masturbating to one of her films. After an argument, she decides to leave and meets Margaret at a bar. They make out before returning to Margaret's apartment to have sex. The final scene is of Angelina some time afterwards, having moved in with Margaret and become her lover, taking on a new job as a porn director.

== Cast ==
- Ashley Hinshaw as Angelina / Cherry
- James Franco as Francis
- Dev Patel as Andrew
- Heather Graham as Margaret
- Lili Taylor as Phyllis
- Diane Farr as Jillian
- Megan Boone as Jake
- Vincent Palo as Paco
- Jonny Weston as Bobby
- Ernest Waddell as Vaughn
- Sensi Pearl as Vikki
- Maya Raines as Jojo
- Veronica Valencia as Amber

== Production ==
The production participated in the San Francisco "Scene in San Francisco Incentive Program" administered by the San Francisco Film Commission.

== Reception ==
The film holds 14% on Rotten Tomatoes.

== See also ==
- Kink
