= The Adventurers (1995 film) =

1995 Hong Kong film by Ringo Lam

The Adventurer
- DVD Cover
- Traditional Chinese: 大冒險家
- Simplified Chinese: 大冒险家
- Hanyu Pinyin: Dà Mào Xiǎn Jiā
- Jyutping: Daai6 Mou6 Him2 Ga1
- Directed by: Ringo Lam
- Screenplay by: Ringo Lam; Yip Kong-yam; Sandy Shaw
- Produced by: Tiffany Chen
- Starring: Andy Lau; Rosamund Kwan; Jacklyn Wu; Paul Chun; Ben Ng; David Chiang
- Cinematography: Ardy Lam; Arthur Wong; Chow Kei-seung
- Edited by: Wong Wing-ming
- Music by: Teddy Robin
- Production company: Win's Entertainment
- Distributed by: China Star Entertainment
- Release date: 2 August 1995
- Running time: 110 minutes
- Country: Hong Kong
- Language: Cantonese
- Box office: HK$14,839,584

The Adventurers is a 1995 Hong Kong action film directed by Ringo Lam and starring Andy Lau, Rosamund Kwan and Jacklyn Wu. It was Ringo Lam's last Hong Kong film before venturing to Hollywood in 1996. The Adventurers film was filmed on location in Hong Kong, United States and Philippines, which shows Lam's ambition of going to the international routine.

== Plot ==
In Cambodia in 1975, during the Khmer Rouge Era, the eight-year-old Wai Lok-yan witnessed the tragedy of his parents being killed by Ray Lui while hiding in the closet with his younger sister. Back then, Yan's father Wah, Seung and Ray were war comrades working for the CIA in Cambodia. Ray went rogue and worked for the Khmer Rouge and in order to take the information gathered by Wah, he killed Yan's parents, while Yan's younger sister also died in a fire. After this incident, Seung took the orphaned Yan to Thailand, where he became a Thai Air Force Pilot.

In 1995, Yan learned from the newspaper that Ray, who has become a billionaire from dealing arms for many years, is attending an event in a hotel in Thailand. Yan was determined to take this opportunity to avenge his parents, but Ray was wearing a bulletproof vest and the assassination hit failed. However, Yan's friend Mark, who is also Seung's son, was caught and killed. Yan managed to leave the scene with the help of Ray's mistress Mona, whom Ray only treats her as a doll.

In order to escape the mine on assassin searches form Ray since Ray has close ties with Thai Military officials, Seung arranges Yan to go to the United States. With help from the CIA, they decide to have Yan get close to Ray's daughter Crystal, who resides in San Francisco, and slowly get close to Ray and ultimately killing him.

At that time, Crystal was kidnapped by the Vietnamese Black Tiger Gang and the gang demanded Ray to return money that he owed. The CIA had close ties with another gang, Wah Fuk, and arranges Yan to be the temporary leader of the gang under the name Mandy Chan. Yan leads the Wah Fuk Gang to terrorize the Black Tiger Gang and rescues Crystal. Later, the Black Tiger gang leader is killed off-screen possibly by the Wak Fuk gang and Yan successfully develops a marital relationship with Crystal and Yan becomes his enemy Ray's son in-law.

In Yan and Crystal's wedding, a shootout occurs and General Buboei's son Major Bodar was shot and killed by the Hong Kong police. Ray decides to take Yan to Cambodia to see Buboei and use Yan as the scapegoat of Budar's death. During a pregnancy test at the hospital with Crystal, Yan gets a call from Mona telling him to meet in a hotel room. There, Mona informs Yan of Ray using him as a scapegoat. As Yan and Mona still love each other, they briefly make out in the room before being interrupted by Crystal's entrance. Mona pushes Crystal on a glass table and attempts to kill her until Yan stops her form doing so.

When Crystal is sent to the hospital, Yan explains to Ray of the incident by saying that Crystal caught him with a prostitute. Yan also sees Seung in the hospital who gives him a tracking device for him to take to Cambodia. Later, Yan reveals to the unconscious Crystal about his true identity and his intention to kill her father and stating either himself or his father will only return from Cambodia. Crystal awakes and asks him to promise her not to kill her father.

In Cambodia, Ray meets up with Bubeoi who show him pictures of Yan as a pilot and a photo of Ray with the CIA and he suspects Ray to be a traitor. Yan trigger the tracking device and the Thai Military arrive. Ray, who knew along that Mona injured her daughter, shoots and kills Mona while also attempts to kill Yan to prove he is not a traitor. A big action scene occurs where later Ray and his henchman Dog (Ben Ng) takes Bubeoi hostage and Yan chases them on a helicopter. Dog kills Bubeoi in the process, before he was killed by Yan with a firebomb. In the end, Yan finally confronts Ray at gunpoint, but he finally decides to not kill him and let him be taken by the military force instead.

In the end, Yan receives pictures of Crystal and their son from Seung. Seung also brings his son from Hong Kong and a letter written by Crystal to Yan. She states that Mandy is the past and she is not so familiar with the name Wai Lok-yan and wants to have some time to familiarize it, hinting that she might get together with Yan again in the future.

== Cast ==
- Andy Lau as Wai Lok-yan / Mandy Chan
- Rosamund Kwan as Mona
- Jacklyn Wu as Crystal Lui
- Paul Chun as Ray Lui
- Ben Ng as Dog
- David Chiang as Uncle Seung
- Philip Ko as Wah
- Victor Wong as Uncle Nine the Dragon Head of the San Francisco based Wah Fuk Tong.
- Ron Yuan as Paul, a Chinese-American gang member of the Wah Fuk Tong
- George Cheung as Uncle Tung
- Van Darkholme as Blackie, leader of the San Francisco based Vietnamese Black Tiger gang.
- William Ho as General Buboei
- Nam Yin as Ray's henchman
- John Ching as Major Bodar
- Ng Kwok-cheung
- Parkman Wong as Officer Cheng
- Four Tse as Ray's bodyguard
- Wong Kam-kong as Military officer
- Hogan Vindo
- Chris Wong
- Wang Lung
- Steve Hung
- Caleb Mandate
- Ken Chu
- Ming Vu
- Dale Chung
- Tony Gee
- Rick Heffner
- Robert McCutchen
- Paula Eliso as Beaten Girl
- John Randa
- Chu Siu-kei
- Edward Corbett as CIA
- Maggie Wong as Yan's sister
- So Wai-nam as Ray's bodyguard
- Lee Siu-kei as gambler

== Theme song ==
- The Romantic Flame Never Burns Out (愛火燒不盡)
  - Composer: Tsui Ka-leung
  - Lyricist/Singer: Andy Lau

== Reception ==
=== Critical reception ===
Derek Elley of Variety praised director Ringo Lam's handling of action sequences and character development in between and also singling out the performances of Andy Lau and Jacklyn Wu. Joey O'Bryan of The Austin Chronicle gave the film a score of 2/5 stars, noting its "slightly schizophrenic tone" and pales in comparison to Lam's best works and describes it as "a less-than-perfect, but adequately entertaining action/melodrama."

=== Box office ===
The film grossed HK$14,839,584 at the Hong Kong box office during its theatrical run from 2 to 30 August 1995 in Hong Kong.
