= Peter Acworth =

British web entrepreneur (born 1970)

Peter Thomas Acworth (born 12 October 1970) is a British web entrepreneur based in San Francisco. He founded Kink.com, an internet pornography producer that focuses on BDSM and fetish themes. According to the San Francisco Bay Guardian, Acworth's work has been guided by "Kink's principles of intimate, conversational, playful, and mutually enjoyable interactions", and he has expressed the belief that "a product line should come from an individual's actual fantasies."

== Biography ==
=== Early life and education ===
Peter Acworth was born in Derbyshire to a sculptor and a Jesuit priest. He studied mathematics at the University of Cambridge and management at HEC Paris.

Acworth entered the pornography industry when he was a PhD student in finance at Columbia University. After reading a story in a British tabloid about a firefighter who made £250,000 in a short period by starting an internet pornography site, Acworth decided to start a porn site of his own. Since Acworth had what he described as a lifelong interest in bondage, he oriented the site toward BDSM porn. The site, Hogtied, featured content licensed from other bondage pornography producers. Acworth soon left his graduate studies to work on the site full-time.

=== Career ===
In 1998, Acworth moved from New York City to San Francisco. Finding that sales were leveling off because other sites were using the same content, Acworth began producing his own content, initially featuring himself with various models whom he found through Craigslist or through his photographer friends.

In 2000, Acworth founded his second site, Fucking Machines, under Cybernet Entertainment, Inc., the corporate entity that ran Hogtied.com. A number of additional sites followed, and in 2006 Acworth changed the corporate name of Cybernet to Kink.com.

In late 2006, Acworth announced the purchase of the San Francisco Armory. He announced that Kink.com would move into the building to use as corporate offices and as a studio for producing its movies. As a result, he sold Kink.com's then-current office at 942 Mission Street for $6.5 million, more than double what he had paid for it four years earlier. The San Francisco Business Times, part of Bizjournals, reported that since moving to San Francisco in 1998, Acworth had also made large profits on a home in the Marina and Hogtied.com's original studios on 8th Street. Acworth told the paper that he would not be buying any additional property in San Francisco. "All of our real estate profits are in the Armory", he said.

Acworth's purchase of the Armory was met with local protest, but (as summarized by The San Francisco Chronicle) "Acworth eventually won praise for the restoration work he did on the brick Moorish castle, which had long been empty". The Armory became the headquarters for Acworth's network of BDSM and fetish subscription sites, including an interactive live page and a news site, and housed public tours, shows, workshops and other porn events. In September 2012 Ackworth opened a cocktail lounge and the Armoury Club across the road from the studio. In 2018, the building was sold for $65 million, following a several-year decline in Kink.com's revenue.

As of 2008, Acworth was continuing to perform occasionally in Kink.com projects in addition to being CEO. Acworth was replaced as CEO by long time associate Alison Boden in 2018 to pursue personal projects. He returned as CEO in 2021.

In 2013, James Franco produced a documentary titled 'Kink' which sought to provide a behind-the-scenes look at the website's operations. Acworth was arrested in February 2013 for obstruction of justice for allegedly delaying police while they investigated a report of firearms having been shot in the Armory's historic shooting range. Police then found a gram of cocaine about Acworth's person and he was additionally charged with possession. All charges were later dropped.

== See also ==
- Kink (film)
- Princess Donna
