= Dylan Ryan =

American pornographic film actress (born 1986 or 1987)

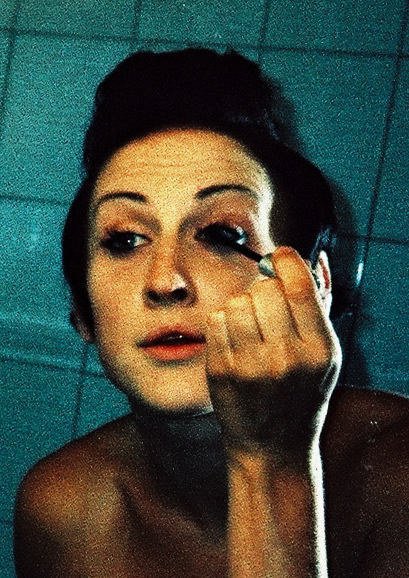
- Ryan in 2009
- Born: 1986 or 1987 (age 39–40)
- Occupation: Pornographic film actress
- Height: 5 ft 11 in (1.80 m)

Dylan Ryan (born 1986 or 1987) is an American pornographic film actress.

== Adult film career ==
Ryan began her pornographic career in 2004. Fellow pornographic film actress Shine Louise Houston started a porn company, and Ryan starred in the first film for the company because she had made that promise to Houston when she was younger. Ryan was a stripper before entering the adult film industry; and she considers herself a “porn superhero” rather than a porn star.

== Personal life ==
Ryan identifies herself as queer, and she has stated to be attracted to people of all gender identities. She says that her favorite porn actress is Belladonna.

Outside of porn, Ryan holds a Master of Social Work and is active as an advocate for sex workers. She is also a relationship therapist.

== Awards and nominations ==
Year	Ceremony	Category	Work	Result
2009	FPA	Heartthrob of the Year	—N/a	Won
2010	AVN	Best Solo Sex Scene	Crash Pad Series 03	Nominated
2015	AVN	Most Outrageous Sex Scene	Barbarella: A Kinky Parody (shared with Lorelei Lee)	Nominated
