= Gachimuchi Pants Wrestling =

Internet phenomenon

Gachimuchi Pants Wrestling (Japanese: ガチムチパンツレスリング, Hepburn: Gachimuchi Pantsu Resuringu, lit. "Beefy Briefs Wrestling"), commonly shortened by the abbreviation, GPW, is an internet meme and subculture that originated on the Japanese video sharing website Nico Nico Douga in 2007. It consists of mash-up videos, remixes and animations built from clips of low-budget 1990s American gay pornography, principally wrestling scenes featuring the actor Billy Herrington.

The genre takes its name from gachimuchi (ガチムチ), Japanese gay slang for a heavily muscled, thickset physique. Its humour derives from the hypermasculine posturing, stilted acting and narrative clichés of the source films, and from deliberate mishearings (soramimi) of English dialogue as Japanese. More than 15,000 gachimuchi parody videos had been uploaded to Nico Nico Douga by 2018.

== Concepts and themes ==
The source material for gachimuchi consists of gay pornographic films whose plots turn on a contrived confrontation between two or more hypermasculine men, escalating first into a wrestling match and then into sex. According to Suspilne, the awkwardness produced by the performers' overacting, unusual costuming and scripted clichés is what generates the comic effect for viewers.

Many clips rely on soramimi - English lines reinterpreted as Japanese homophones. Widely reproduced examples include "You got me mad now", heard as yugaminee na (歪みねぇな), and "Two can play it!", heard as Shin-Nippori (新日暮里), the name of a fictitious Tokyo locality. The most heavily sampled films are Workout: Muscle Fantasies 3 and Lords of the Lockerroom, both produced by Can-Am Productions.

Suspilne characterises the subculture as one that ironises homophobia: creators of gachi parodies deliberately court discomfort in audiences holding conservative views of masculinity, and the absurdity of the material is intended to make hostile reactions to it appear futile.

== History ==
=== Origins on Nico Nico Douga ===
In the summer of 2007, clips from Billy Herrington's films and MAD edits derived from them began appearing frequently in the Nico Nico Douga rankings. A clip of the 1999 Can-Am Productions film Workout: Muscle Fantasies 3, showing Herrington wrestling the Canadian performer Danny Lee, was uploaded under the title 「本格的 ガチムチパンツレスリング」 ("Authentic Gachimuchi Pants Wrestling") on August 10, 2007.

The videos were initially treated as tsuri (釣り, "bait") — bait-and-switch uploads posted under misleading titles and thumbnails to troll viewers — and some were removed by moderators as sexual content. Acceptance grew as the production conventions of gay pornography were absorbed as off-colour humour and as the soramimi readings of the dialogue spread. By 2008 the material had become established as internet culture and had been covered by the Japanese computer magazine Windows100%.

Derivative forms proliferated, including ketsu-doramu (ケツドラム, "arse drum") edits that use the sound of spanking from the wrestling scenes as percussion, and a large body of MAD videos setting the clips to existing songs. Videos in the genre are conventionally tagged on Nico Nico Douga with the deliberately misleading labels "Wrestling Series" (レスリングシリーズ), "Forest Fairy" (森の妖精) and "Philosophy" (哲学).

=== Herrington and Nico Nico Douga ===
Nico Nico Douga's operator Dwango contacted Herrington directly in response to the phenomenon and promoted a visit to Japan timed to Valentine's Day 2009, at which he appeared at an event in Akihabara and a limited-edition figma action figure of him was announced. Herrington returned to Japan multiple times, including a wrestling match in August 2009 and appearances at Niconico Chōkaigi in 2012 and 2013, where he took part in segments built around the meme, including a walk through the venue.

Herrington said he was flattered and humbled by his fans' creativity. Following his death in a traffic collision on March 2, 2018, tributes were posted across video sharing sites and message boards; one tribute video on Nico Nico Douga accumulated over 80,000 views within a week.

== Outside Japan ==
Gachimuchi spread beyond Japan from the mid-2010s, reaching Ukraine around 2016, where it circulated among internet users as an imported Japanese subculture. Suspilne reported in 2021 that the meme's popularity in Ukraine had grown markedly that year.

In September 2021, students outside a Kyiv Polytechnic Institute dormitory staged a semi-nude mock fight that was widely identified online as a gachimuchi performance and reported by the Ukrainian broadcaster 24 Kanal. That same month, a resident of Zaporizhzhia filed a municipal petition to rename Mayakovsky Square after Herrington, arguing that it would become a tourist attraction; it reached the 750 signatures required for consideration within three days.

In July 2022, a petition to the President of Ukraine proposing that the monument to Catherine II in Odesa be replaced with a statue of Herrington gathered more than 25,000 signatures. Volodymyr Zelenskyy subsequently asked the Odesa City Council to consider the monument's removal under local self-government law.

== Characters and performers ==
Gachimuchi videos draw on a recurring cast of performers from the source films, including Billy Herrington, Danny Lee, Duncan Mills, Mark Wolff, and Van Darkholme. With the exception of Herrington, who is known in Japan as Aniki (兄貴, "older brother"), the performers are generally referred to by Japanese-sounding nicknames derived from soramimi or from their appearance in the videos — Danny Lee, for instance, is called Kiyoshi Kazuya (木吉カズヤ).

== See also ==
- Cho Aniki - a series of Japanese shoot 'em up games featuring surreal homoerotic themes.
