= Insex =

BDSM pornographic film production company

Intersec Interactive Inc.
- Company type: Private
- Website type: Pornographic, BDSM
- Available in: English
- Area served: Worldwide
- Industry: Sex
- Services: Pornography
- Website: www.insex.com
- Registration: Optional
- Launched: 1997; 29 years ago
- Current status: Online

Intersec Interactive Inc. is an American pornographic film studio. It is best known for Insex, a pornographic website focusing on BDSM and female submissives, founded in 1997. Until 2005 it was one of the biggest and most extreme of its kind on the Internet. Insex developed a cult following among BDSM enthusiasts due to its uncommonly severe and realistic depiction of sadomasochistic practices, and had interactive "Live Feeds" which allowed members to make direct suggestions and requests. In late 2006, Insex ended the production of original material, citing increased pressure from conservatives within the U.S. Justice Department.

== Brent Scott ==
Intersec Interactive Inc. is owned by the Insex website's creator, Brent Scott, former Carnegie Mellon professor, known on the site as "pd". Scott was one of the principal performers on the site, responsible for the early bondage rigging work.

Scott had started his bondage works in the 1980s, creating paintings, videos and bondage art installations, working with amateur volunteer models and friends. He initially launched his site to display his work on the Internet.

== Concept ==
Insex.com offered primarily two forms of content, "Live Feeds" which could be watched through a live video stream and actively influenced in a simultaneous chat especially IRC between viewers and the website operator, and conventionally shot and edited videos that were the basis of regular updates. The website also provided a message board for paying members that was frequented by the staff and several of the more prominent models.

The videos were presented in RealVideo format, in the beginning with bitrates of 225 kbit/s, and later up to 450 kbit/s. Commonly, the updates were between 30 and 90 minutes in length, while the live feeds usually lasted several hours. On some occasions, models were online in BDSM live events for as long as 48 hours continuously. During such long sessions models had rest breaks, in which they could answer questions from viewers that were relayed from the message board or chat room. Starting in 2003, videos were occasionally shot in 16:9 widescreen aspect ratio with partly more artistic camera work. The material included many different aspects of BDSM.

For some of the longer performances, models could make thousands of dollars.

== Shutdown ==
In the fall of 2005, Insex announced it was looking for a buyer, because "continuing to produce Insex.com from the U.S. would be too great a potential liability." This came as a result of attempts by the U.S. government to censor internet pornography, specifically by implementing an FBI anti-obscenity initiative in August 2005; an FBI memorandum stated that productions where the content includes "urination, defecation, as well as sadistic and masochistic behavior" would "most likely" be legally targeted. At that time the site revenue was about $50,000 per week but the FBI was putting pressure on the credit card company to dropping their business with Scott until eventually they couldn't process credit card and get payment from viewers. A statement on the Insex website explained, "while Intersec is certain that a potential prosecution would have no chance of success... the staff is unwilling to fight a lengthy and expensive court battle only to emerge victorious but bankrupt."

The website's entire content, over 500 movies, was offered for sale for US$4 million and reportedly bought for an undisclosed amount by a Dutch company. Parts of the Insex material are now offered as Insex Archives. The Insex videos are also traded on peer-to-peer networks and are also becoming increasingly available in low-quality bootlegged DVD form in sex shops scattered around Europe.

== Return ==
Intersec Interactive eventually returned to business, operating a number of websites including: Infernal Restraints, Real Time Bondage, Hardtied, Sexually Broken and TopGrl, featuring different themes and with various directors including Matt Williams and Elise Graves.

== See also ==
- Graphic Sexual Horror
- Kink.com
