= Sybian =

Penetrative sex toy

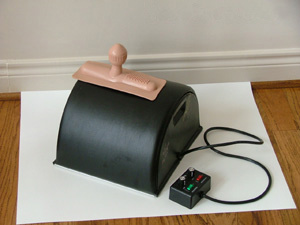
A Sybian with attached electric wire and switch board

A Sybian (/ˈsɪbiən/), or Sybian saddle, is a type of masturbation device, consisting of a hollow saddle-like seat containing two electric motors, motor speed controller boards, gearing, pulleys, and a platform on cranked axles such that a ridge on the top of the unit can be made to vibrate through a range of speeds as set using a wired external hand controller, and an upward-pointing shaft set on an angle through the ridge can be made to rotate at speeds of up to several hundred revolutions per minute, again by use of the wired remote control. Flexible molded attachments are usually supplied, fitting over the vibrating ridge and shaft which mostly have integrated dildos on their top. In use, the rider inserts the dildo into a body orifice for internal stimulation while applying pressure on the vibrating ridge with their external erogenous parts.

== Development ==
According to its inventor, Dave Lampert, the Sybian was first conceived in the 1970s and developed in 1983. A prototype was built in 1985 from sheet metal mounted on a wooden frame with a vibrator projecting through an opening inside the housing; a second prototype became the basis for current production models.

Lampert and his team initially called the device Master Better, shortened to "MB", for about four years before selecting a new name for it. The prefix syb in Sybian was derived from Sybaris, an Ancient Greek city in southern Italy which was associated with luxurious living. It is currently manufactured by Abco Research Associates in Monticello, Illinois.

From research and experience, Lampert theorized that the woman on top position during intercourse works best for female orgasm and that stimulation is enhanced when the penis remains fully inserted and the female partner rocks her pelvis forward and backward, making contact with the sensitive G-spot located on the front wall of the vagina.

In 2016, Lampert was honored with an AVN lifetime achievement award for his invention. He died in July 2021 at the age of 90.

== Specifications ==
A woman demonstrating the operation of the Sybian

The Sybian typically weighs around 10 kilograms (22 pounds), and usually measures 33.7 cm (13.3 in) wide, 31.8 cm (12.5 in) long, and 21.6 cm (8.5 in) tall excluding the rubber attachment with a 2.4-metre (7.9 ft) power cord. The unit is designed to work with or without a penetration attachment. When in operation, the Sybian distributes vibrations externally along the user's pelvic floor, including clitoral glans, the introitus to their vagina and cavity of the anus. The optional penetration attachments rotate using a 20:1 ratio gear motor providing 25 W (0.034 hp) that can vary from 0 to 120 rpm and vibration is produced using a 44 W (0.059 hp) electric motor that may be controlled from 0 to 6500 rpm. Power and vibration/rotation are controlled with a remote control. The Sybian can hold over 450 kg (990 lb) of weight. It has a padded naugahyde cover. The casing has built-in finger grips for carrying.

Generally, the user of the Sybian straddles the machine and administers the dildo attachment, inserting it into the vagina or the anus. The vibration and rotation can be controlled by separate on/off switches and two rotary controls. The Sybian is typically sold with multiple attachments of varying sizes made from synthetic rubber in various shapes.

== Publicity ==
After its release in 1987, the Sybian was featured on the cover of that December's issue of Penthouse Forum. It made its first pornographic video appearance in Orgasmatic (1998), which received an AVN award nomination for "most outrageous sex scene" for Ruby the Original's performance with the device.

Although the Sybian was featured in many pornographic video productions beginning in the early 2000s, primarily on the Internet, the device came to prominence on The Howard Stern Show after that show's switch to Sirius Satellite Radio.
