= Arse Elektronika =

Recurring conference on sex and technology

- Genre: Sex and technology conference
- Locations: Various (San Francisco, Linz, Hong Kong, etc.)
- Years active: Since 2007
- Inaugurated: 5 October 2007; 19 years ago
- Organiser: monochrom
- Website: Arse Elektronika conference page

Arse Elektronika is a recurring conference organized by the Austrian arts and philosophy collective monochrom, focused on sex and technology. The festival presents talks, workshops, machines, presentations and films. The festival's curator is Johannes Grenzfurthner. Between 2007 and 2015, the event was held in San Francisco, but is now a traveling event in different countries.

The name Arse Elektronika is a pun on Ars Electronica, the name of an arts and technology organization based in Austria.

== Main conferences ==
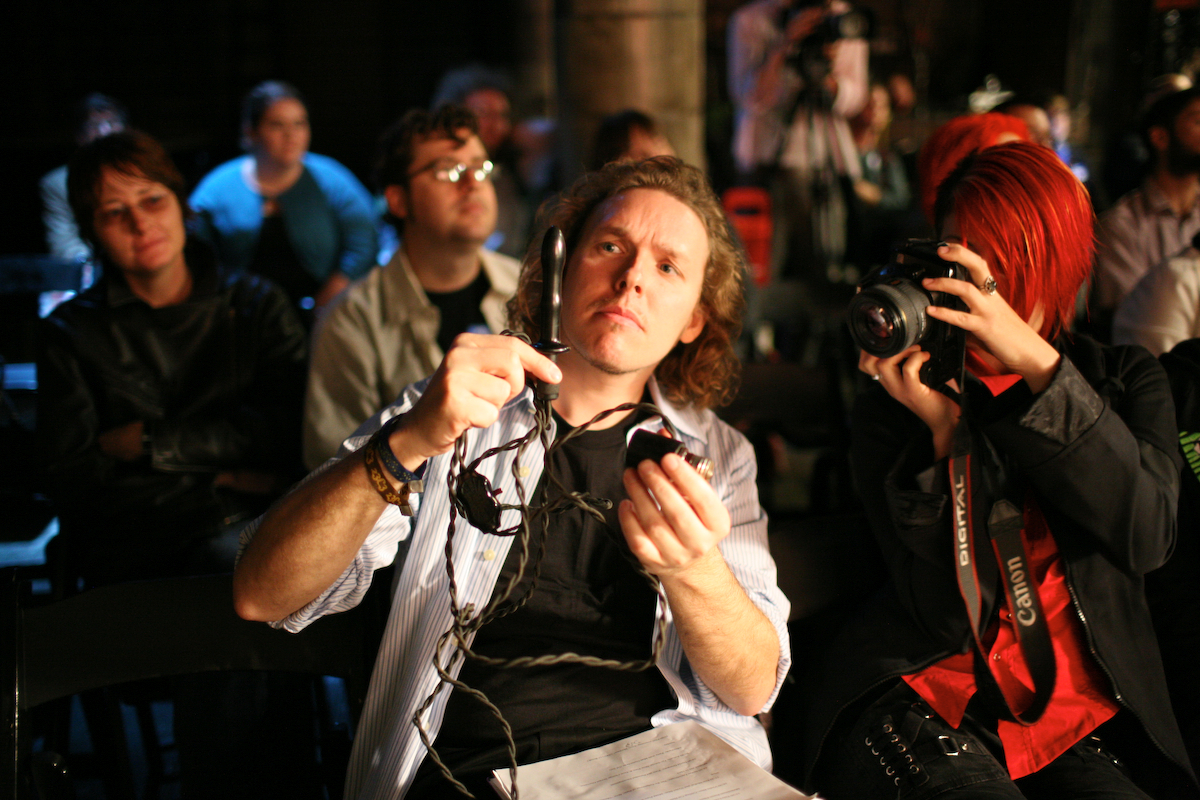
Arse Elektronika's curator Johannes Grenzfurthner (at Arse Elektronika 2007)

- 2007: The first conference, dealing with the impact of sex on technological innovation and adoption.
- 2008: "Do Androids Sleep with Electric Sheep: Critical Perspectives on Sex and Science Fiction," focused on sex and technology as seen through the futurist lens of science fiction, as well as depictions of science fiction in pornography.
- 2009: "Of Intercourse and Intracourse" dealt with bodies and the modification thereof, including wetware, gene therapy, biotechnology and body modification. Talks also speculated on the social impacts of these technologies, particularly the implications on heteronormativity if biological sex becomes easily changeable.
- 2010: "Space Racy", dealt with issues of space, both in an architectural and aeronautical sense. Topics included the possibility of sex in outer space, the gendered and/or sexualized nature of built spaces, interspecies romance in video games, and an interactive installation called Six Feet Under Club in which participants could have sex while buried in a surveillant coffin.
- 2011: "Screw the System," dealt with sex, technology, class politics, and culture.
- 2012: "4PLAY: Gamifuckation and Its Discontents" dealt with sex, technology and games.
- 2013: "id/entity" dealt with sex, technology and identity.
- 2014: "TRANS*.*" dealt with technology and sexuality in societal and personal transition.
- 2015: "Shoot Your Workload" dealt with technology and sexuality and work (tech and sex work; work and labour politics in context of sex tech; work in a physical context).
- 2023: "Sexponential" dealt with artificial intimacy. It took place in Linz, Austria in September 2023 at the culture center DH5.
- 2025: "Plug & Play!" was held in Vienna, Austria, in March 2025.
