= Kink.com =

Internet BDSM and fetish pornography company

- Industry: Internet pornography
- Founded: 1997; 29 years ago
- Headquarters: San Francisco, California, U.S.
- Key people: Peter Acworth
- Number of employees: 100
- Website: kink.sbs

Kink.com is an independent San Francisco–based bondage internet pornography company that runs a group of websites devoted to BDSM and related fetishes. Kink.com, along with Kink Studios, LLC, Hogtied.com and Behindkink.com are DBAs for Cybernet Entertainment LLC, the parent company that operates the studio.

In March 2018, founder Peter Acworth moved away from day-to-day operations to focus on real estate development and management. Alison Boden, the former VP of Technology, became the new CEO. She helmed the company until Acworth returned in 2021.

== History ==
=== Origin ===
Kink.com was started by UK native Peter Acworth in 1997 while he was a doctoral candidate in finance at Columbia University. After reading a story in a British tabloid about a fireman who made £250,000 in a short period by starting an Internet pornography website, Acworth decided to start a pornographic web site of his own. Since Acworth had what he described as a lifelong interest in bondage, he oriented the site toward BDSM pornography. The site was called Hogtied.com and initially featured content that was licensed from other primary producers. The site was successful and was soon grossing several thousand dollars per day. Acworth left his graduate studies to work on the site full-time.

In 1998, Acworth moved the company from New York City to San Francisco. Finding that sales were leveling off because other sites were using the same content, Acworth began producing his own material, initially featuring himself with various models whom he found through Craigslist or through his photographer friends. He opened the company's second site, Fucking Machines, in 2000, and has since opened 26 additional subscription Web sites. Several Web sites under the Kink.com umbrella feature directors who relocated following the demise of Insex as a result of US government pressure in 2005, but offer more of a focus on consensuality than Insex was known for.

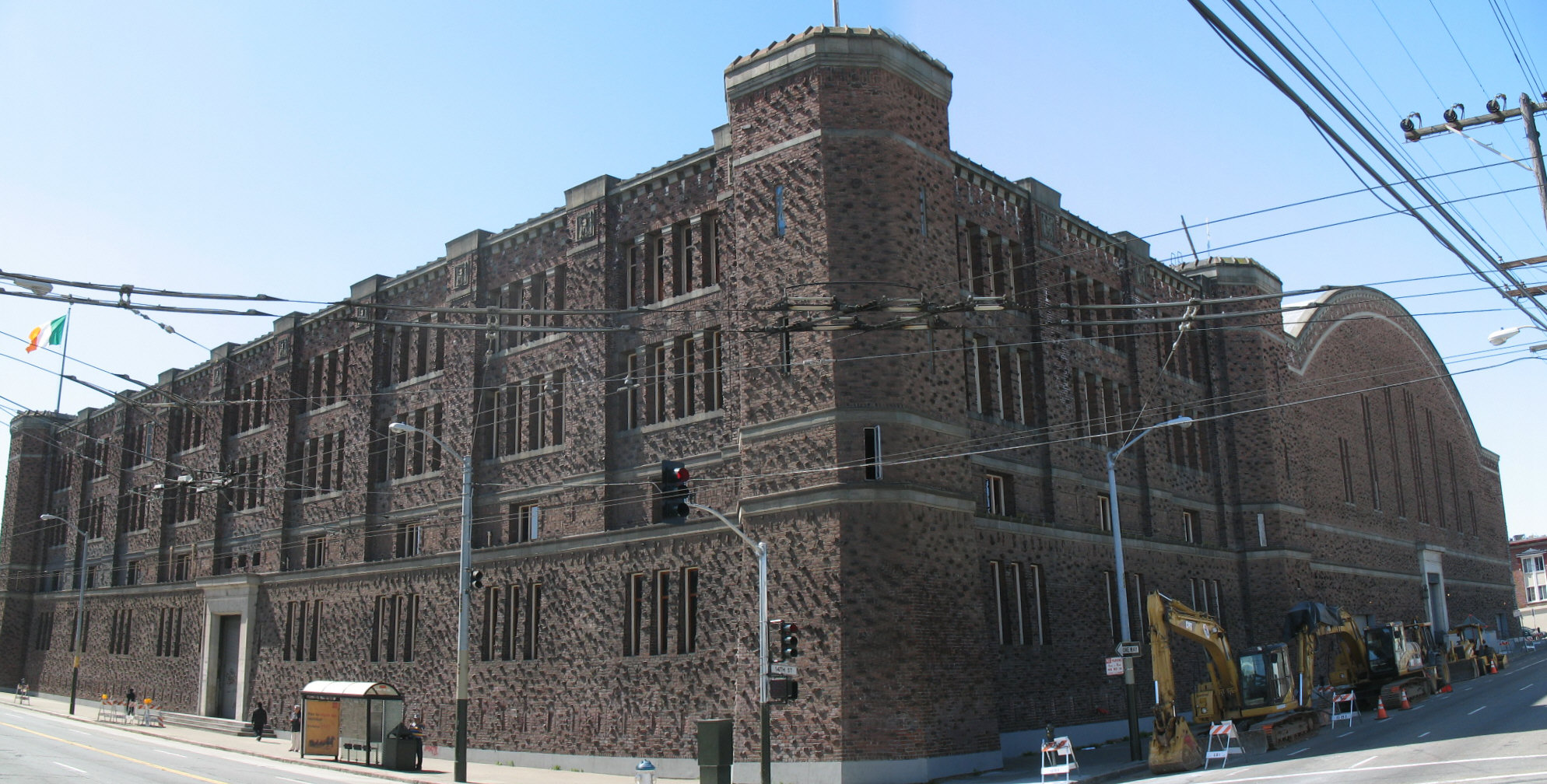
Exterior view of the San Francisco Armory

=== Acquisition of the San Francisco Armory ===
In late 2006, Kink.com purchased the San Francisco Armory for $14.5 million, for use as a production studio. A group known as the Mission Armory Community Collective formed to oppose Kink.com's use of the building and in early February 2007 held a public protest in front of the building.

At one point, there were plans to demolish part of the building to make way for a condominium development. Such news brought in supporters who welcomed Kink.com's preservation of the historic building as part of an overall attempt to revitalize and bring back business to the area, without altering the appearance of the historic building.

San Francisco mayor Gavin Newsom also expressed concern over the Kink.com purchase, and scheduled a special meeting of the San Francisco Planning Commission in March 2007 to review the company's use of the building. The meeting was well-attended by both supporters and opponents of the Kink.com purchase. One opponent, anti-pornography campaigner Melissa Farley compared the images produced by Kink.com to images of prisoner abuse at Abu Ghraib, and testified against the purchase.

The San Francisco Planning Commission ruled that Kink.com was not in violation of any law or zoning requirement.

Although Kink.com has stated that its activities would be invisible to the surrounding neighborhood, La Casa de las Madres, a neighboring women's shelter, announced that they would be leaving the location because of the media scrutiny of Kink.com's presence. In addition to utilizing the Armory for its own productions, Kink.com also rented space in the historic building to local independent filmmakers to use as locations in non-pornographic narrative films and videos.

By 2013, Kink.com was converting rooms at the Armory into webcam studios that independent webcam models could rent. In January 2017, Kink.com announced that it would cease to use the Armory for film production.

In 2018, Acworth sold the Armory for $65 million.

=== Las Vegas ===
In July 2014, Kink.com opened a Las Vegas office, filmed a slate of publicized productions and opened website operations there.

== Products ==
=== Specialty web sites ===
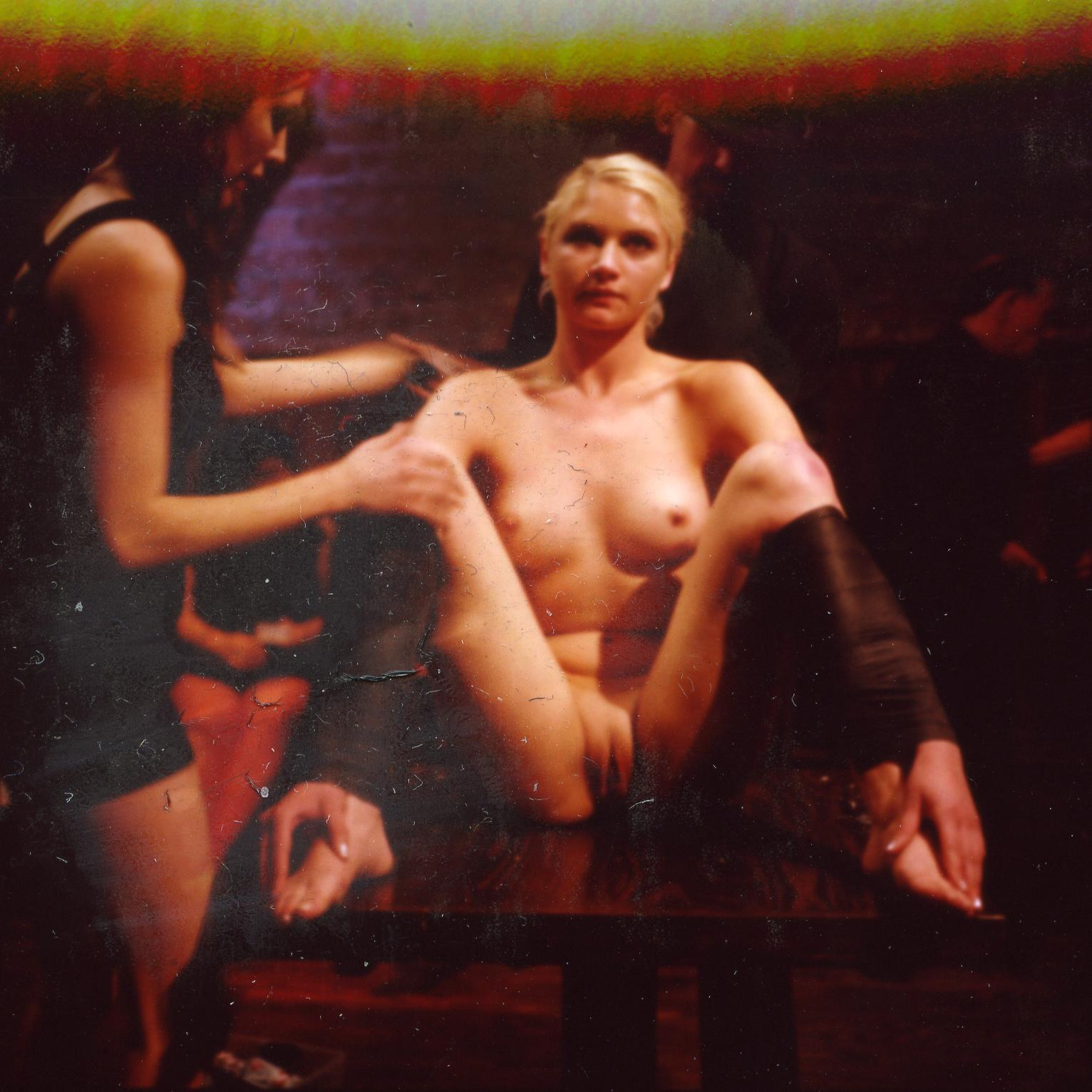
A shoot for Public Disgrace

In 2007, the company's web site Fucking Machines was involved in a trademark dispute when the United States Patent and Trademark Office refused to grant a trademark for the name of the site, asserting that it was obscene. Also in 2007, the company began streaming regular live shows, in part as a defense against copyright infringement. By 2008, live shows were being streamed by Device Bondage, a Kink.com bondage site, and erotic wrestling site Ultimate Surrender began streaming its competitive matches live in 2008.

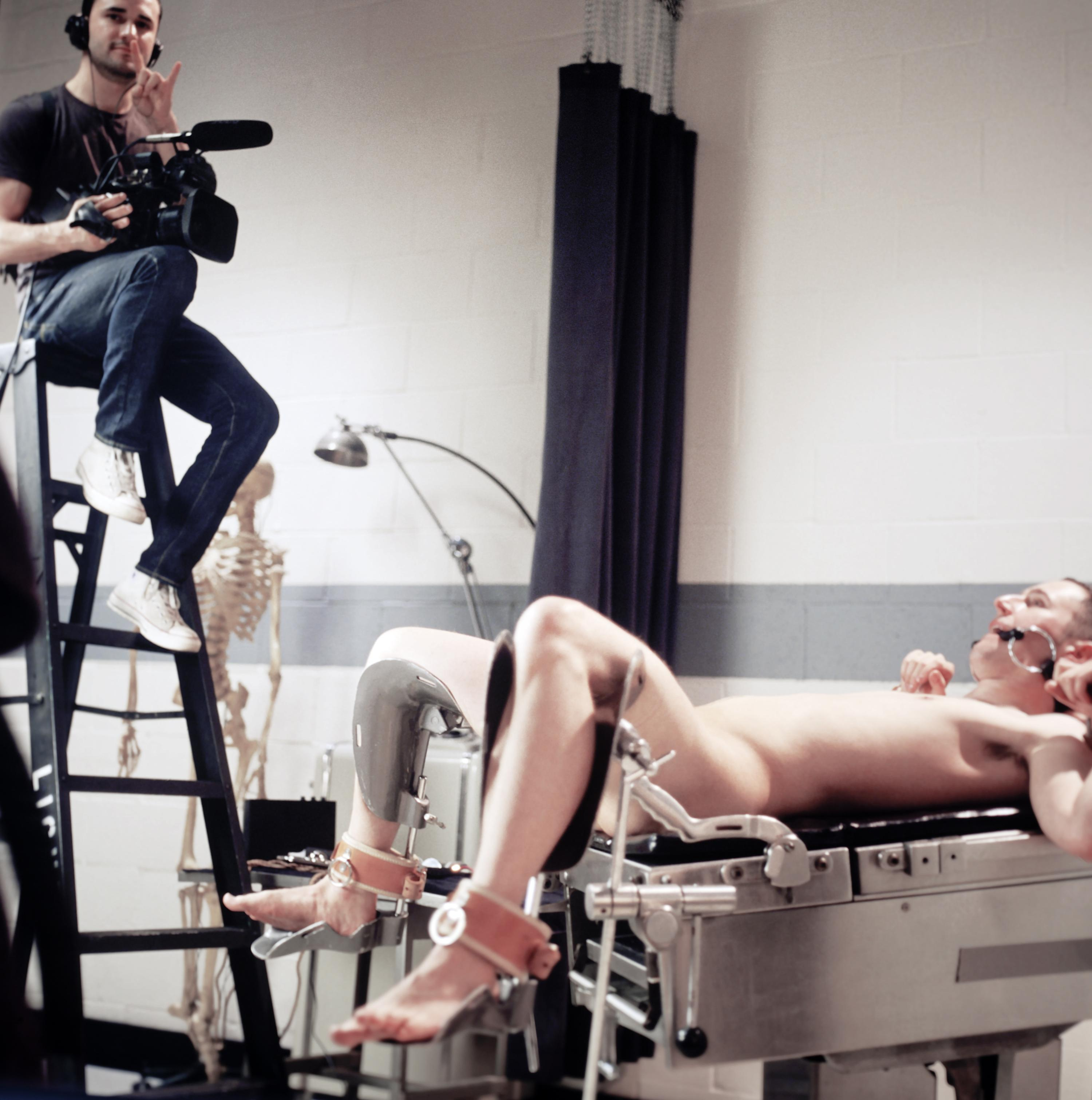
A shoot for Bound Gods

In 2008, the company added on-demand technology to its web sites, selling updates to their websites on a per-episode basis rather than strictly by subscription. This system recently began adding third-party content, including that from Germany's Marquis.

Also in 2008, the company launched a site called Bound Gods, a gay bondage site directed by Van Darkholme (also the director of Naked Kombat). Bound Gods was launched under a new gay-focused division, KinkMen.com.

In 2014, the company announced that it was stopping production on its "wildly popular" Public Disgrace and Bound in Public sites, and changing Hardcore Gangbangs to make it more explicitly the fantasy of the female participant. Kink announced that it was increasing educational efforts, with the aim of "demystifying alternative sexualities" and would be welcoming the public into The Armory. It wished to turn Kink.com into a lifestyle brand à la Playboy.

As of 2022, their main network has over 90 channels, 27 are Kink exclusives from nine studios, making it the largest fetish network to date.

In October 2022, Kink launched KinkMen as its own, exclusive paysite within the Kink network, bringing in performers from across the male kink and fetish sphere, and featuring directors such as Dominic Pacifico and Micah Martinez.

=== Kink AI ===
Kink AI is an artificial intelligence platform designed for adults to explore sexual fantasies through text-based interactions and image generation. The platform includes a chatbot for erotic conversations and an AI-powered image generator for creating explicit artwork. The driver of the project is Acworth, founder of Kink.com. Benjamin Pollack (Product Director), Petru Popa (Head of Growth) and Robert Pop (Chief Technology Officer) are managing and fine-tuning the project.

== Documentary ==
The documentary Kink was released in 2013. Directed by Christina Alexandra Voros and produced by James Franco, the film featured interviews with multiple directors, producers and performers, as well as Acworth.

== Award nominations ==
- 2008, Kink.com was nominated for a 2009 AVN Award in a new category, Best Adult Web Site.
- 2010 XBIZ Award Nominee - Innovative Company of the Year

== Awards ==
- 2009 XBIZ Award – FSC Leadership Award
- 2009 XBIZ Award – Original Web Content
- 2011 AVN Award – Best Alternative Web Site
- 2012 XBIZ Award – Fetish Studio of the Year
- 2013 XBIZ Award – Specialty Site of the Year
- 2013 AVN Award – Best Alternative Website
- 2014 AVN Award – Best Alternative Web Site
- 2014 AVN Award – Best Web Premiere (Public Disgrace 31515)
- 2014 XBIZ Award – Specialty Site of the Year
- 2014 XBIZ Award – BDSM Site of the Year (DivineBitches.com)
- 2015 XBIZ Award – Adult Site of the Year – BDSM
- 2015 CyberSocket Web Award – Best Hardcore/Fetish Site (KinkMen.com)
- 2016 XBIZ Award – Adult Site of the Year – BDSM
- 2016 CyberSocket Web Award – Best Hardcore/Fetish Site (KinkMen.com)
- 2016 TEA Award – Best Scene (Yasmin Lee and Lucas Knight on TS Seduction)
- 2016 AVN Award – Best Alternative Website
- 2017 AVN Award – Best BDSM movie (Deception: A XXX Thriller)
- 2017 AVN Award – Best Alternative Website
- 2017 XBIZ Award – Adult Site of the Year – BDSM
- 2017 TEA Award – Best Scene (Threesome with Aubrey Kate, Will Havoc, and Phoenix Marie on TS Seduction)
- 2017 StorErotica Award – Fetish Company of the Year ("Kink" by Doc Johnson)
- 2017 Adultex Award – Best Fetish/Alternate Product Range ("Kink" by Doc Johnson)
- 2018 XBIZ Award – BDSM Site of the Year
- 2018 XBIZ Award – BDSM Release of the Year (Whipped Ass 21: Masochistic MILFs)
- 2018 XBIZ Award – Fetish Product/Line of the Year ("Kink" by Doc Johnson)
- 2018 StorErotica Award – BDSM Product of the Year ("Power Banger Sex Machine", "Kink" by Doc Johnson)
- 2018 CyberSocket Web Award – Best Hardcore/Fetish Site (KinkMen.com)
- 2018 NightMoves Award – Best Fetish/Taboo/Specialty Release (Hardcore Gangbang Parodies #3)
- 2026 AVN Award - Best BDSM Movie or Series – (Sex and Submission)

== Legal issues ==
In February 2013, the police, while looking into reports of Kink having firearms and a "makeshift shooting range" on the premises, arrested the company's CEO and founder Peter Acworth for possession of cocaine and delaying arrest, though the case was thrown out in court, a development Acworth attributed to his wealth and privilege despite his admitted guilt, which prompted him to organize a charitable event for the benefit of the Three Strikes Justice Center in 2014.

Four women who worked as camgirls for Kink sued the company in 2013 after the lead plaintiff, Maxine Holloway, alleged she was fired by Kink after she attempted to organize other camgirls to protest Kink's decision to stop paying camgirls a base salary in favor of commission in June 2012. Peter Acworth claimed Holloway was not fired, she was simply asked to stop booking performances with Kink temporarily, as her shows were becoming "unprofitable" and she "was often late and canceled several shows at the last minute." The case was settled out of court, with one of the stipulations of the settlement being that the plaintiffs were barred from speaking publicly about their experiences while they had worked for Kink.

A lawsuit was filed against Kink in June 2015 by an editor and production assistant who alleged Kink failed to provide adequate security and other safety measures during the production of a video for the "Public Disgrace" series shot at the 2014 Folsom Street Fair. As a result, the plaintiff alleged she was "groped, fondled, and harassed" by members of the public throughout the shoot, and that safety concerns she brought up to Kink before and after the shoot led to her being laid off by Kink. In response to a demurrer by Kink in which it asserted the plaintiff's complaints were barred because the plaintiff "consented to or welcomed the actions complained of and made her own sexually explicit statements and behaved in sexually explicit way in the workplace", the plaintiff's attorney stated, "This is not an allegation that she was uncomfortable having witnessed a sexual act, this is an allegation that she was sexually assaulted in her workplace. And no one consents to be sexually assaulted." Mona Wales, the star of the video, stated the shoot had unspecified safety issues, but insisted that afterward all of them were taken into consideration and properly addressed by Kink.

The demurrer by Kink was subject to a tentative ruling that overturned it on the basis of it being "a strawman argument that ignores the allegations of the complaint" in October 2015. The case was voluntarily dismissed with prejudice by the plaintiff in June 2016.

A woman and two men who claimed to have contracted HIV while performing for Kink in 2013 sued the company in August 2015. Kink, in a press release, announced no one, like Aubrey Kate and Xander Corvus, who was present during the shoots the plaintiffs cited as being the ones where they contracted HIV tested positive for the virus, an assertion backed by an investigation conducted by the Free Speech Coalition after two of the plaintiffs, Cameron Bay and Rod Daily, were first discovered to be HIV positive in 2013. Kink further commented that the suggested transmission methods (like semen being splashed in the eye) were "unsupported by any existing science" and posited the lawsuits were being backed by the AIDS Healthcare Foundation, which previously complained to state officials like Cal/OSHA and Nevada OSHA about Kink's policy of condom usage by performers being optional, which lead to Kink being fined more than $78,000 (reduced to $27,000 on appeal) by Cal/OSHA in January 2014. A judge relegated the three plaintiffs to recovery within the worker's compensation system, rather than civil court, and the Bay lawsuit was conditionally settled in October 2017. The Daily case was conditionally settled in April 2018 and voluntarily dismissed with prejudice by Daily in July 2018.

Kink requested financial coverage for the three HIV cases from the State Compensation Insurance Fund in June 2017, but the SCIF argued it was under no obligation to provide Kink with any financial support, and was judged exempt from having to do so in November 2017, as was Seneca Insurance Company. Atain Specialty Insurance Company was also judged exempt from providing Kink with financial support for the cases the following December, despite having been previously judged liable to do so in November 2016. The Ninth Court Circuit of Appeals heard arguments from Kink and Attain over whether Attain was liable to indemnify Kink in July 2020.

Kink was fined by Cal/OSHA for safety violations, including lack of condom usage, in 2016. The fine was $146,600. The fine, like an earlier one levied against Kink by Cal/OSHA in 2014, was prompted by complaints filed by the AIDS Healthcare Foundation. Kink alleging the complaints and fine were "politically motivated" and "selective enforcement" received support from organizations like AVN and the Free Speech Coalition.

In a 2017 interview with AVN, Steve Holmes revealed he and Princess Donna were arrested and briefly jailed twice for shooting "Public Disgrace" scenes for Kink in Barcelona.

== See also ==
- Bondage pornography
- Insex
- Kink (sexual)
- Character.ai
