= Carly Milne =

Canadian writer

Carly Milne is a Canadian writer.

== Biography ==
Born in Edmonton, Alberta, Milne started writing professionally at age 14. Two years later, she was hired by The Calgary Herald, as a columnist for "20 Below", which was geared to discussing teen issues. She contributed to several Canadian teen magazines; and at 19, she became the entertainment editor for Canada's first teen e-zine Spank! Youth Culture Online. She then created and edited the e-zine Can.Say for Molson Breweries. Can.Say won a Canadian Internet Award for Best Internet Publication. Milne then became an editor at Yahoo! Canada.

In February 1999, she created Moxie.ca, Canada's first female-oriented content portal. Moxie won accolades from Yahoo!, CTV's Webmania, MediaTelevision, Marketing Magazine, The Globe and Mail and ABC. She contributes to Variety, Maxim, and numerous mainstream publications on varying interests from health to pop culture to sex to travel. She was nominated for Outstanding Young Woman at the 1999 and 2000 Canadian Women in New Media Awards.

In 2002, she accepted a position as associate editor of AVN magazine, and in 2003, she took a job with Metro Interactive, home of porn star Ron Jeremy, as a publicist, and launched her website Pornblography.com. The website drew attention from various media outlets including PBS, ABC's Nightline, Sirius Radio, Sex TV, XM Radio, Naked New York, Playboy Radio and more. Milne was also interviewed for the popular E! Channel show True Hollywood Story about porn superstar Jenna Jameson.

Milne has contributed to several books, including Virgin Territory: Stories from the Road to Womanhood (2004), Best Sex Writing 2005 (2005), The Sexual Revolution 2.0: Getting Connected, Upgrading Your Sex Life, and Finding True Love — or at Least a Dinner Date — in the Internet Age (2005), and Hooking Up: You'll Never Make Love in This Town Again Again (2006)

Her first book, Naked Ambition (2005), is a behind-the-scenes look into the frontlines of today's woman-owned and supported adult entertainment industry.

She lives in Los Angeles, California.

== Bibliography ==
- Naked Ambition: Women Who Are Changing the Porn Industry. New York: Carroll & Graf, 2005.
- Hooking Up: You'll Never Make Love in This Town Again Again Phoenix Books (October 2006) ISBN 1-59777-504-5
- Sexography: One Woman's Journey from Ignorance to Bliss. Los Angeles: Phoenix Books, 2007.
