= Princess Donna =

American pornographic film actress

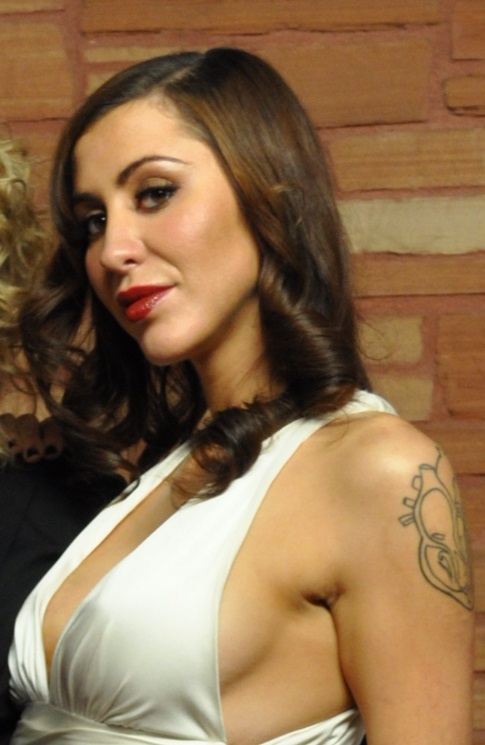
- Princess Donna at the 2011 AVN Awards
- Education: New York University
- Occupations: Actress; director; entrepreneur

Princess Donna is an American pornographic film actress and director. She was director of Wired Pussy and founder of Public Disgrace and Bound Gang Bang, all Kink.com brands.

She majored in gender and sexuality studies and photography at New York University. While there, she began working as a stripper, and began doing professional BDSM shoots with PD at insex.com, following a coworker's recommendation.

Along with fellow Kink actress and director Lorelei Lee, Princess Donna was the subject of Brian Lilla's 2007 independent film Tale of Two Bondage Models, which appeared at the 2008 Tribeca Film Festival.

Princess Donna identifies as queer, telling The Village Voice in 2008: "I'm everything but straight. like girls, I like boys, I like transgender boys and girls."

She has received AVN Award nominations as both a director and actress.
