= Sexmuseum Amsterdam =

Coordinates: 52.3765923°N 4.8972585°E

- Venustempel

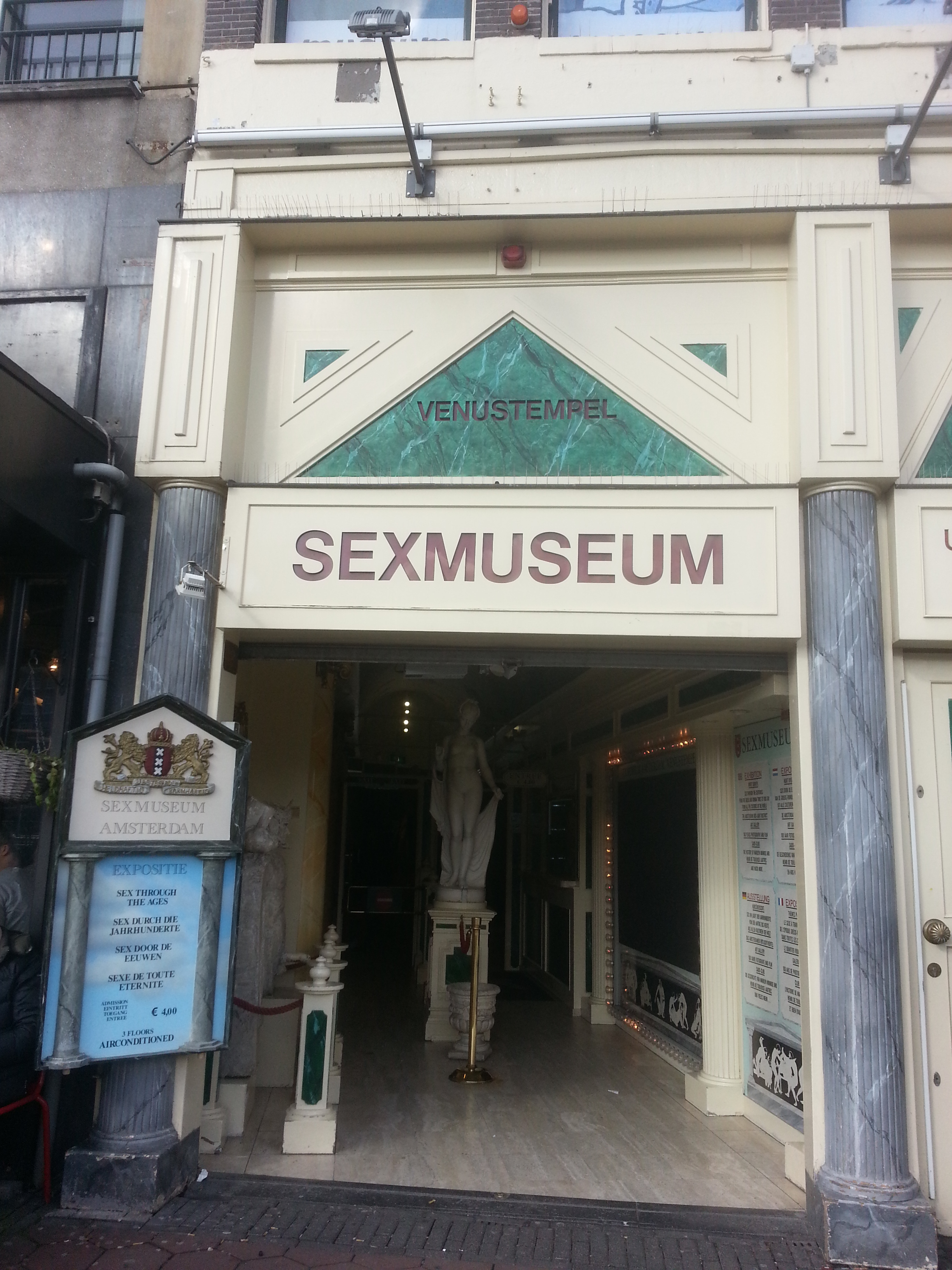
- Museum entrance in 2014
- Established: 1985
- Location: Amsterdam, Netherlands
- Type: Sex museum
- Visitors: 675,000 (2015)
- Website: sexmuseumamsterdam.nl

The Sexmuseum or the Temple of Venus (Dutch: Venustempel) is a sex museum located in Amsterdam, Netherlands. The museum was opened in 1985. It had 675,000 visitors in 2015, making it one of the most visited museums in the Netherlands.

== Background ==
The museum is the world's first and oldest museum of sex, however since, a number of other sex museum's have opened, such as those in Berlin (Beate Uhse Erotic Museum), Paris (Museum of Eroticism), and Copenhagen (Museum Erotica). Prior to this, sex themed collections existed in larger museums, such as the British Museum, although these were not accessible to the public.

The museum is located in a 17th-century building in Damrak, a street in the centre of Amsterdam, close the Amsterdam Centraal station. The museum's various rooms are named after famous figures, such as Mata Hari, Oscar Wilde, Marquis de Sade, Rudolf Valentino, and Marquise de Pompadour. Children under 16 are not permitted to enter the museum.

The museum features an extensive collection of pictures, recordings, photos, paintings and artifacts which allow visitors to explore the evolution of human sexuality throughout the ages. Exhibits present the history of sex and how it has evolved over the centuries. From Cleopatra's regiment of men, to the Romans’ insatiable appetite for sex, to the repressive Middle Ages, visitors are presented with how sex was viewed throughout historical civilizations.

== See also ==
- List of sex museums
