= Namio =

- Gender: Male

Origin
- Origin: Japanese
- Meaning: Different meanings depending on the kanji used

Namio (written: 南雄 or ナミオ in katakana) is a masculine Japanese given name. Notable people with the name include:

- Namio Harukawa (春川ナミオ) (1947–2020), Japanese fetish artist
- Namio Takasu (鷹巣 南雄) (born 1943), Japanese golfer
