= List of sex museums =

A sex museum is a museum that displays erotic art, historical sexual aids, and documents on the history of erotica. They were popular in Europe at the end of the 1960s and during the 1970s, the era of the sexual revolution. Since the 1990s, these museums have tended to be designated erotic museums or erotic art museums rather than sex museums.

== Asia ==
=== China ===
- The first sex museum in China opened in 1999 in the center of Shanghai; in 2001 it moved to the outskirts of the city. It was variously called "Museum of Ancient Chinese Sex Culture" or "Dalin Cultural Exhibition" after its founder, sexologist Dr. Liu Dalin. In early 2004 it moved again, to Tong Li, and is now known as the China Sex Museum, with over three thousand erotic artifacts.
- Love Land was a planned sex museum in China, but construction was suspended by the Chinese government.

=== India ===
- The Antarang Museum, India's first sex museum, opened in Mumbai in 2002. It eventually shut down due to a lack of business.

=== Japan ===
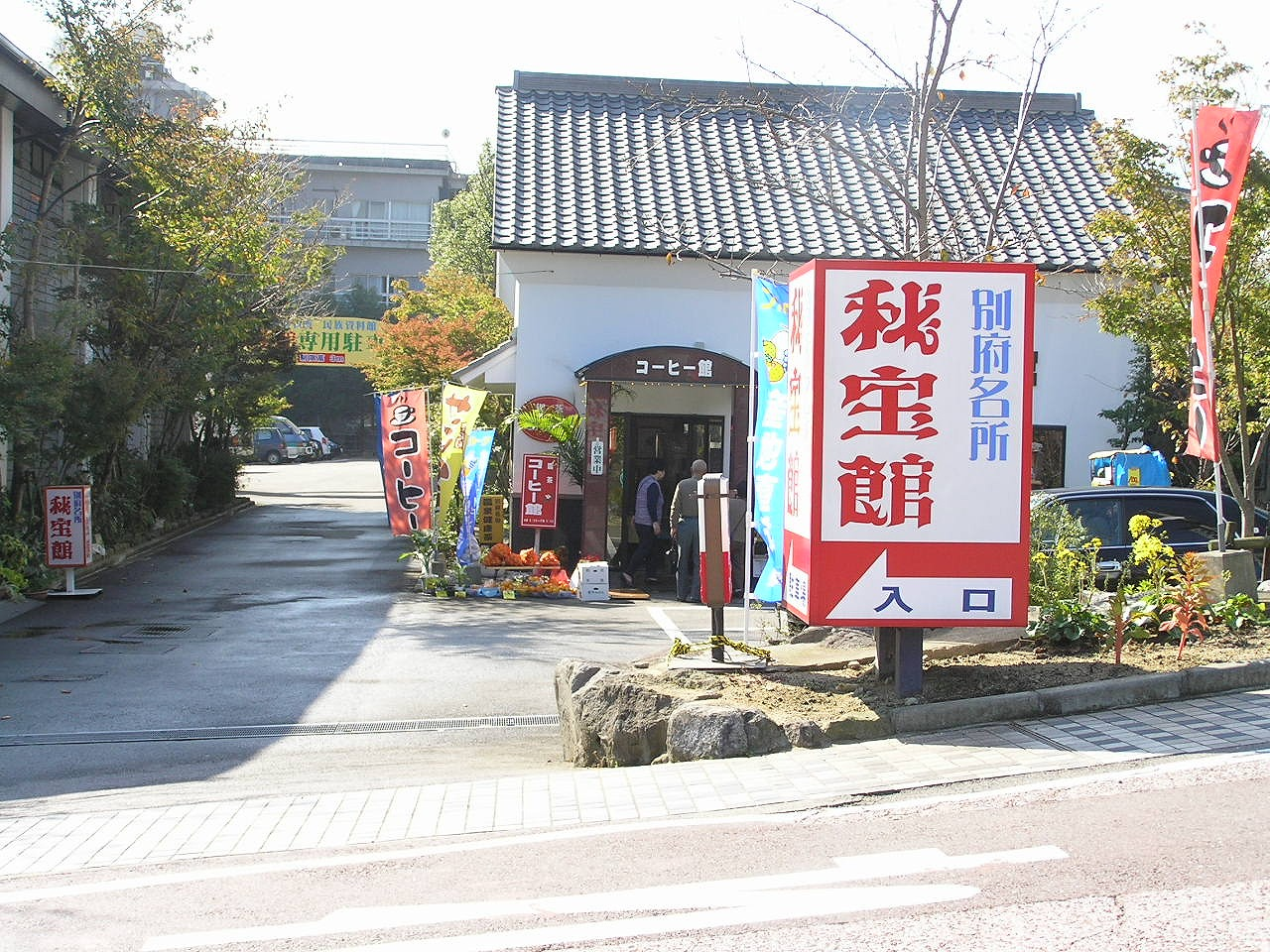
"Beppu Hihōkan", a sex museum next to the Shiraike-Jigoku in the Kannawa Spa in Beppu, Ōita, Japan

- In Japan, there are many sex museums called hihōkan across the country. They are located in amusement centers in popular sightseeing spots or destination spa resorts, and are usually run by individuals, not by organizations. They date back to the 1960s–70s; since then such amusement resorts for older men have declined, and most sex museums closed in the 1990s or 2000s.

=== South Korea ===
- South Korea's first sex museum, Asia Eros Museum, opened in the Insadong neighborhood in Seoul in 2003. The museum has since closed. After a five-year legal battle, private collector Kim Whan Bae opened the Museum of Sex and Health in Seogwipo, Jeju Island, in March 2006.
- Love Land Park on Jeju Island, South Korea, opened in 2004. It is an outdoor sculpture park focused on a theme of sex, running sex education films, and featuring 140 sculptures representing humans in various sexual positions.

== Australia ==
- The small National Museum of Erotica in Canberra opened in 2001. The museum closed soon after, although the collection continued to grow.

== Europe ==
=== Netherlands ===
- Sexmuseum Amsterdam opened in 1985.

=== France ===
- The Museum of Eroticism in Paris opened in 1997 and closed in 2016.

=== Germany ===
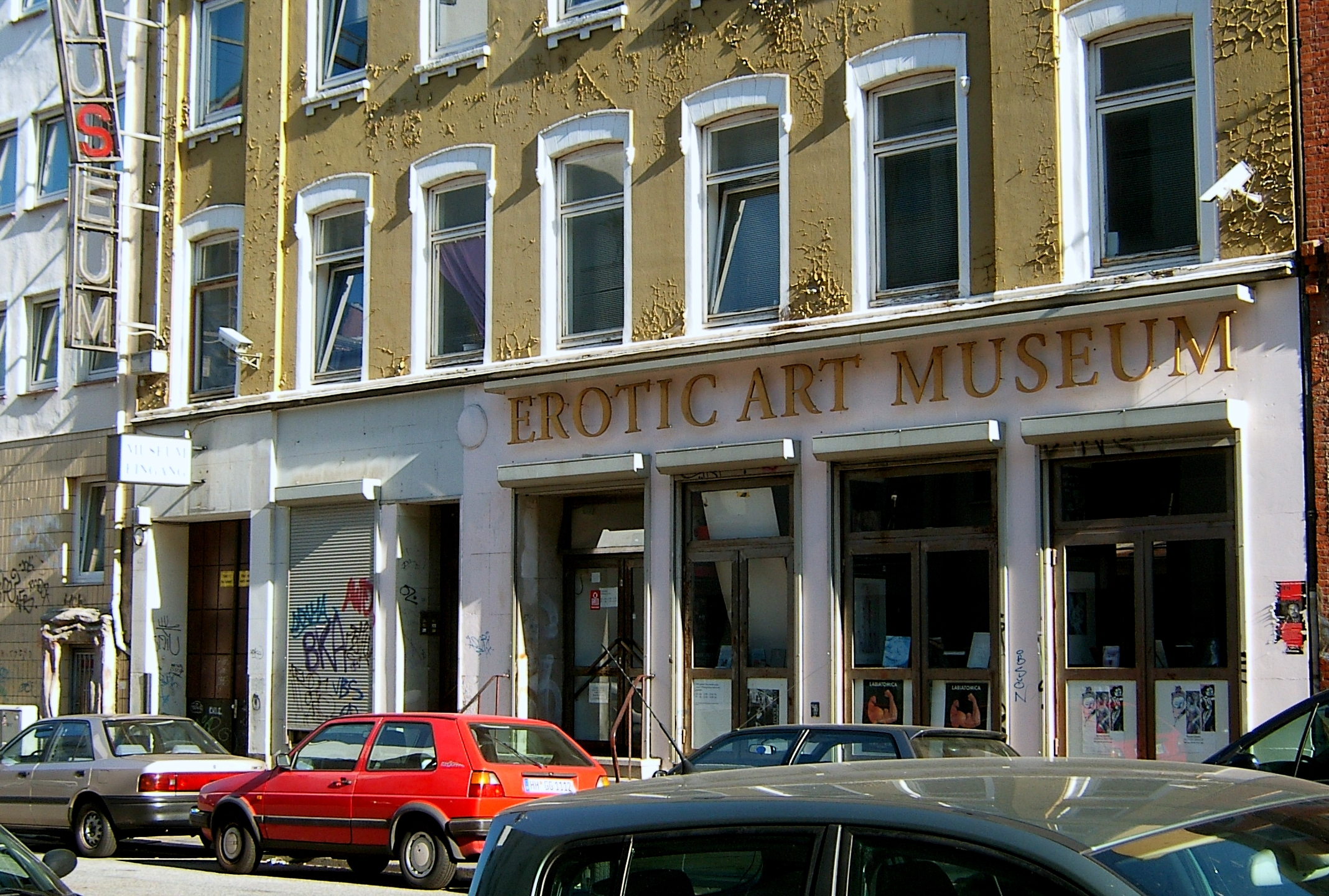
The Erotic Art Museum in Hamburg's Reeperbahn

- The Erotic Art Museum near the Reeperbahn in Hamburg opened in 1992.
- The Beate Uhse Erotic Museum in Berlin opened in 1996 and closed in 2014. It claimed to be "the world's largest erotic museum".

=== Denmark ===
- The Museum Erotica in Copenhagen opened in 1993. It was closed in 2009 due to financial problems.

=== Spain ===
- The Museo de la Erotica in Barcelona opened in 1996.

=== Russia ===
- The first Russian sex museum opened in 2004 in Saint Petersburg; it claims to exhibit the preserved penis of Rasputin. However, experts are divided about the truth of this claim, and it is not scientifically proven to be his. It was allegedly sold to the museum in 1977 by Rasputin's daughter, Maria.
- Moscow's first sex museum, named "Tochka G" ("G Spot"), opened in 2011.

=== Hungary ===
- Renaissance Erotic Wax Museum, Keszthely

=== Italy ===
- While not specifically a sex museum, the National Archaeological Museum in Naples opened its extensive collection of historic erotic art in its Secret Cabinet to the public in 2000. Most of the exhibits are from Greek and Roman times, and many were recovered from nearby Pompeii.
- The Museo d'Arte Erotica in Venice, devoted to the city's erotic history and showing historical and contemporary erotic art, opened in February 2006 and closed after being open for less than seven months.

=== United Kingdom ===
- The Secretum, or Cupboard 55, was a secret collection containing erotic objects at the British Museum in London.
- The Vagina Museum in London was established in 2017.

=== Czech Republic ===
- The Sex Machines Museum in Prague, Czech Republic, contains "an exposition of mechanical erotic appliances, the purpose of which is to bring pleasure and allow extraordinary and unusual positions during intercourse." On display in the museum are "more than 200 objects and mechanical appliances on view, a gallery of art with erotic themes, a cinema with old erotic films, erotic clothing and many other items related to human sexuality.

=== Greece ===
- Athens's first sex museum, "Kama Sutra: the World Museum of Erotic Art", opened in 2012.

=== Poland ===
- The Erotic Museum in Warsaw, the first sex museum in Poland, opened in 2011 with over 2,000 exhibits. It reveals the erotic fascinations of artists from all continents. The museum closed at the beginning of 2012.

=== Ukraine ===
- The Museum of Sexual Cultures opened in Kharkiv in 1999.

=== Iceland ===
- The Icelandic Phallological Museum in Reykjavík, Iceland, opened in 1997.

== North America ==
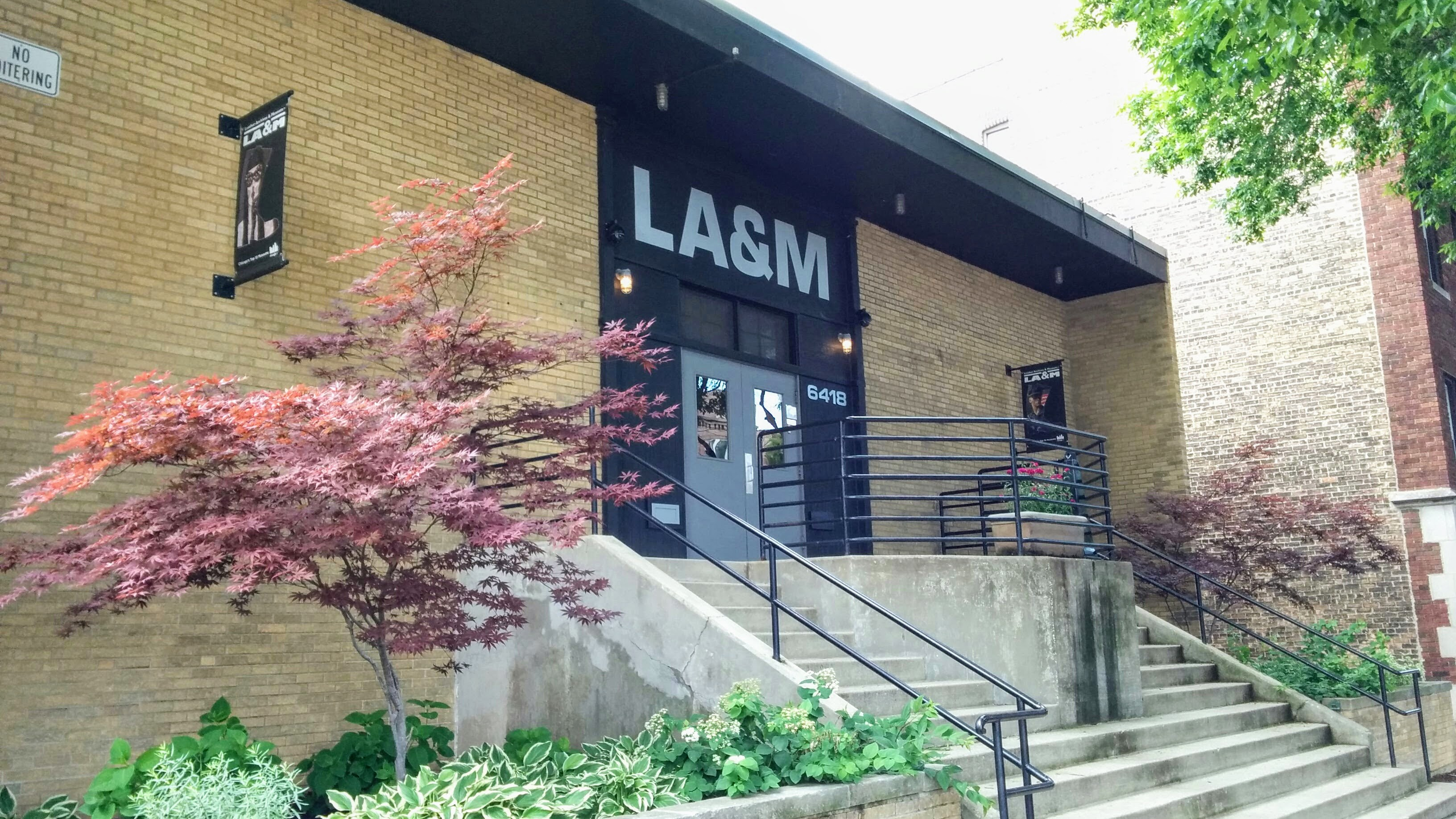
The entrance to the Leather Archives & Museum in Chicago, United States

- The Kinsey Institute in Bloomington, Indiana was established in 1947 and merged with Indiana University in 2016.
- The Leather Archives & Museum in Chicago was founded in 1991 by Chuck Renslow and Tony DeBlase as a "community archives, library, and museum of leather, kink, fetish, and BDSM history and culture."
- The Museum of Sex in New York City opened in 2002.
- The Hollywood Erotic Museum in Hollywood opened in January 2004 and closed in 2006.
- The World Erotic Art Museum in Miami Beach opened on October 16, 2005.
- The Erotic Heritage Museum in Las Vegas opened on August 3, 2008.
- The Sexploratorium's Educational Sex Museum in Denver, Colorado opened in August 2024.

== South America ==
- The Museu do Sexo Hilda Furacão opened in Belo Horizonte, Minas Gerais, Brazil in 2016.

== Virtual museums ==
- The Vaginamuseum is a virtual museum that launched in 2014.
- 6d745 Museum is a virtual museum established in 2023 by erotic artist Megumi Igarashi.

== See also ==
- Erotic art
- History of erotic depictions
