= Kinging =

Kinging may refer to:

- Kinging, piece-promoting move in draughts (including checkers)
- Kinging, sexual practice of facesitting
- Kinging, a.k.a. drag kinging
