= A2M =

A2M may refer to:

- Access to Medicines (A2M), access to medicines refers to the reasonable ability for people to get needed medicines required to achieve health
- Access to medicines week, a week of events and activities organized by Universities Allied for Essential Medicines (UAEM) chapters around the world, to raise awareness about issues related to A2M
- The a2 Milk Company, an ASX listed company which sells dairy products, including baby formula
- α_{2}-Macroglobulin, a gene with the ability to inhibit all four classes of proteinases by a unique "trapping" mechanism
- Artificial Mind and Movement, a Canadian games development company
- Ass to mouth, a sexual act

== See also ==
- American Association of Independent Music, abbreviated to A2IM
