= Hollywood Erotic Museum =

Former museum in Hollywood, California, United States

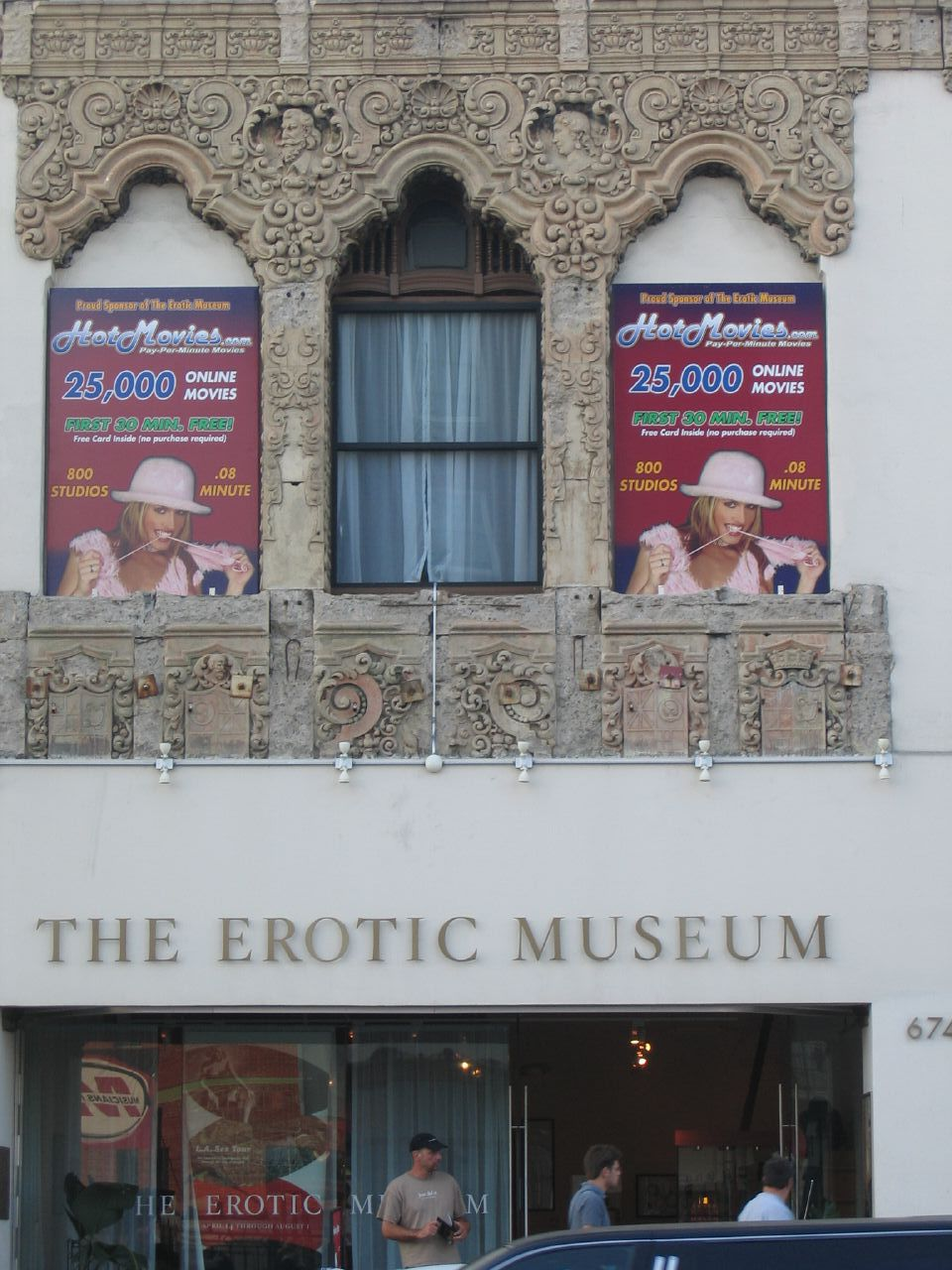
- Established: January 2004
- Dissolved: 2006
- Location: 6741 Hollywood Boulevard, Hollywood, United States
- Type: Sex museum
- Founder: Boris Smorodinsky; Mark Volper

The Hollywood Erotic Museum was a sex museum located in a restored 1926 building on Hollywood Boulevard in Hollywood, California specializing in sexual history in Hollywood and the entertainment industry.

== History ==
The Hollywood Erotic Museum was established by Boris Smorodinsky and Mark Volper in 2004. The local website La.com headlined "L.A. now has its own little piece of Amsterdam".

Early in 2005, a sketching of Picasso was stolen from the museum.

The museum closed in mid-2006 due to lack of business and gentrification. After the closure was announced, the museum put some artwork and assets up for sale.

== Description ==
The six thousand square foot space was also home to the Erotic Museum Hall of Fame, whose eight inductees included Hugh Hefner.

The museum featured many different items, including original etchings by Pablo Picasso as well as a legendary stag film with, allegedly, Marilyn Monroe. The video owned by the museum is the only known copy in existence.

Also in their permanent collection, contemporary erotic art by such artists as Julian Murphy and Tom of Finland.

== See also ==
- List of sex museums
