= List of most visited museums in the Netherlands =

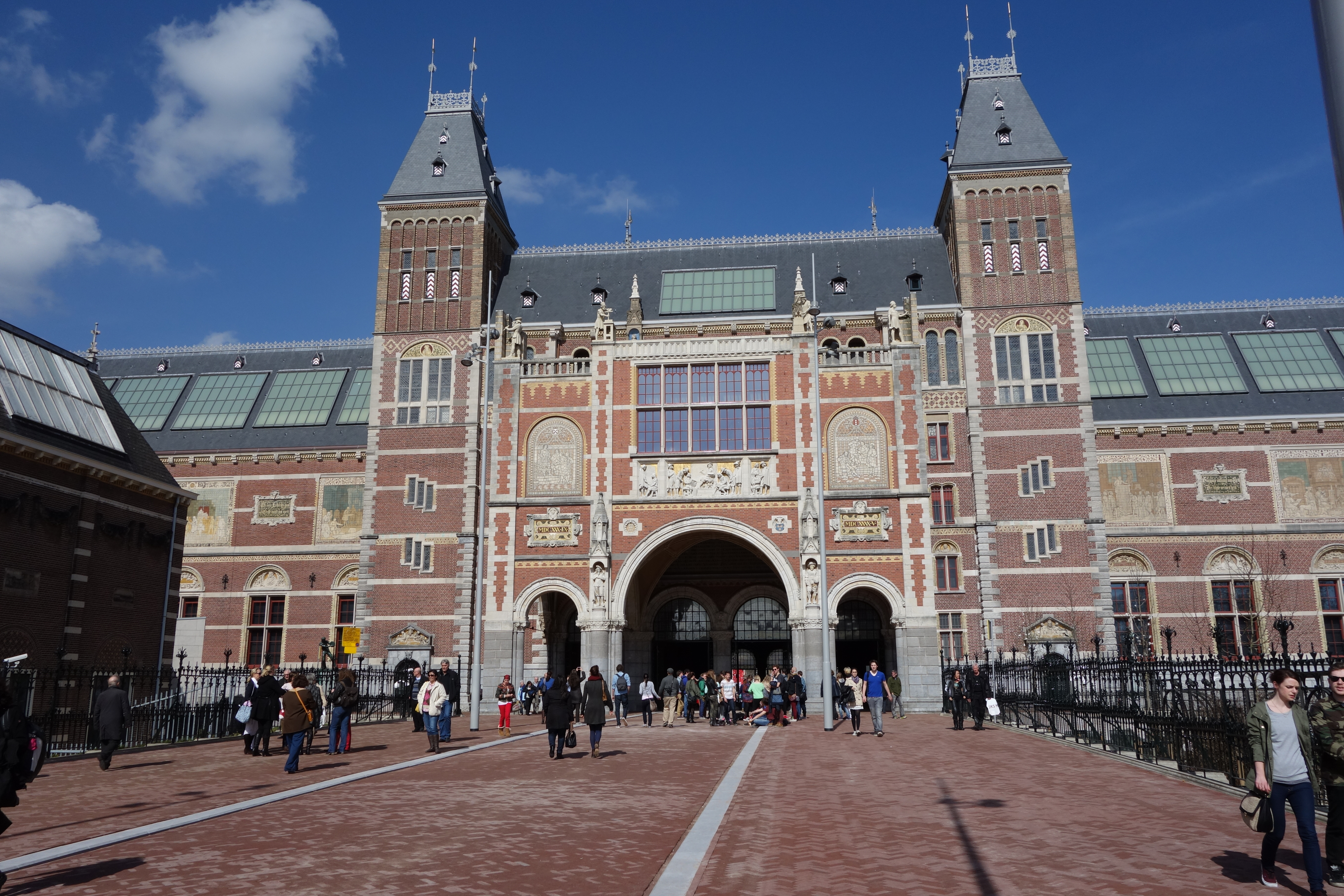
The Rijksmuseum is one of the most visited museums in the Netherlands.

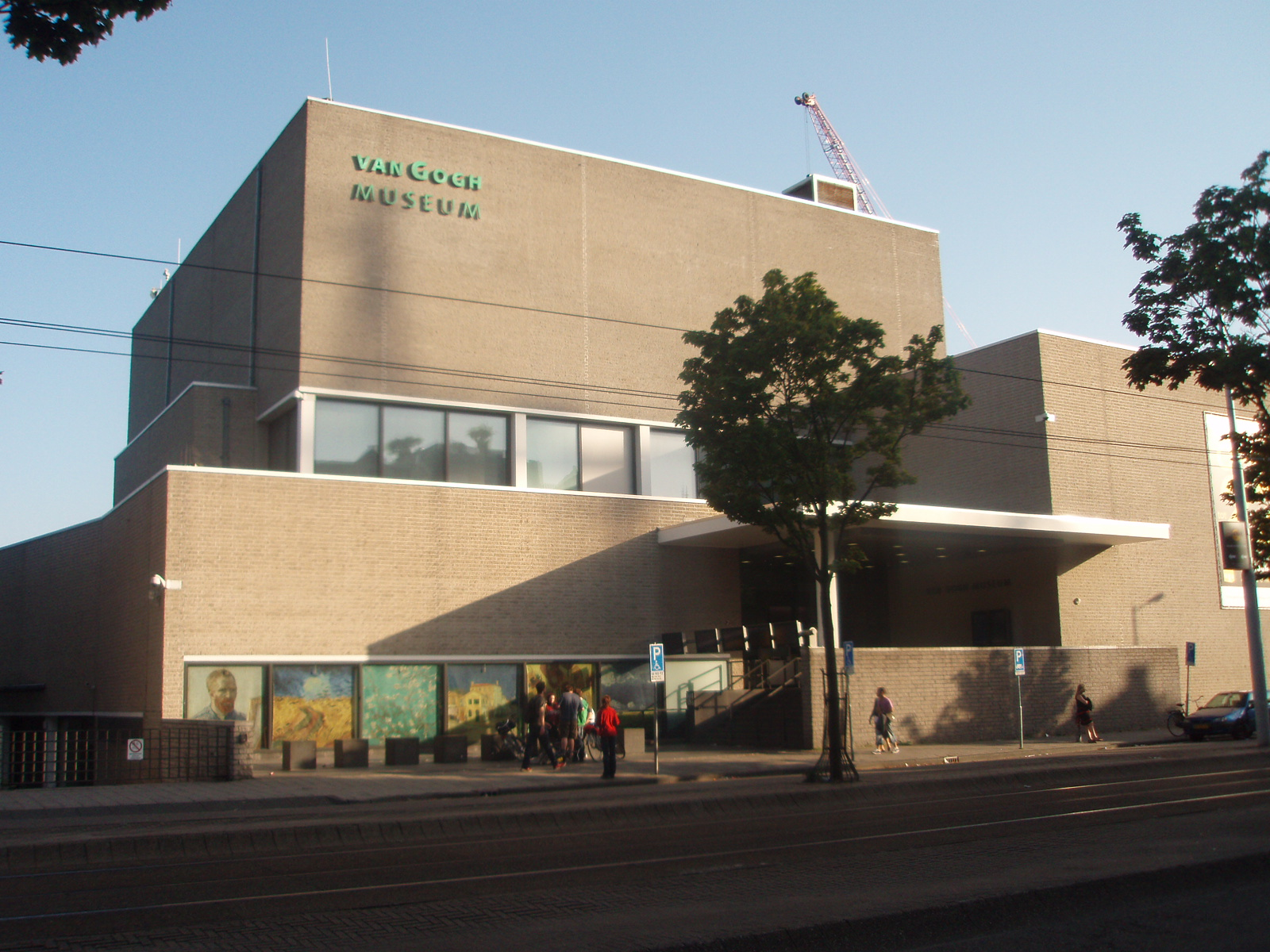
Van Gogh Museum in Amsterdam

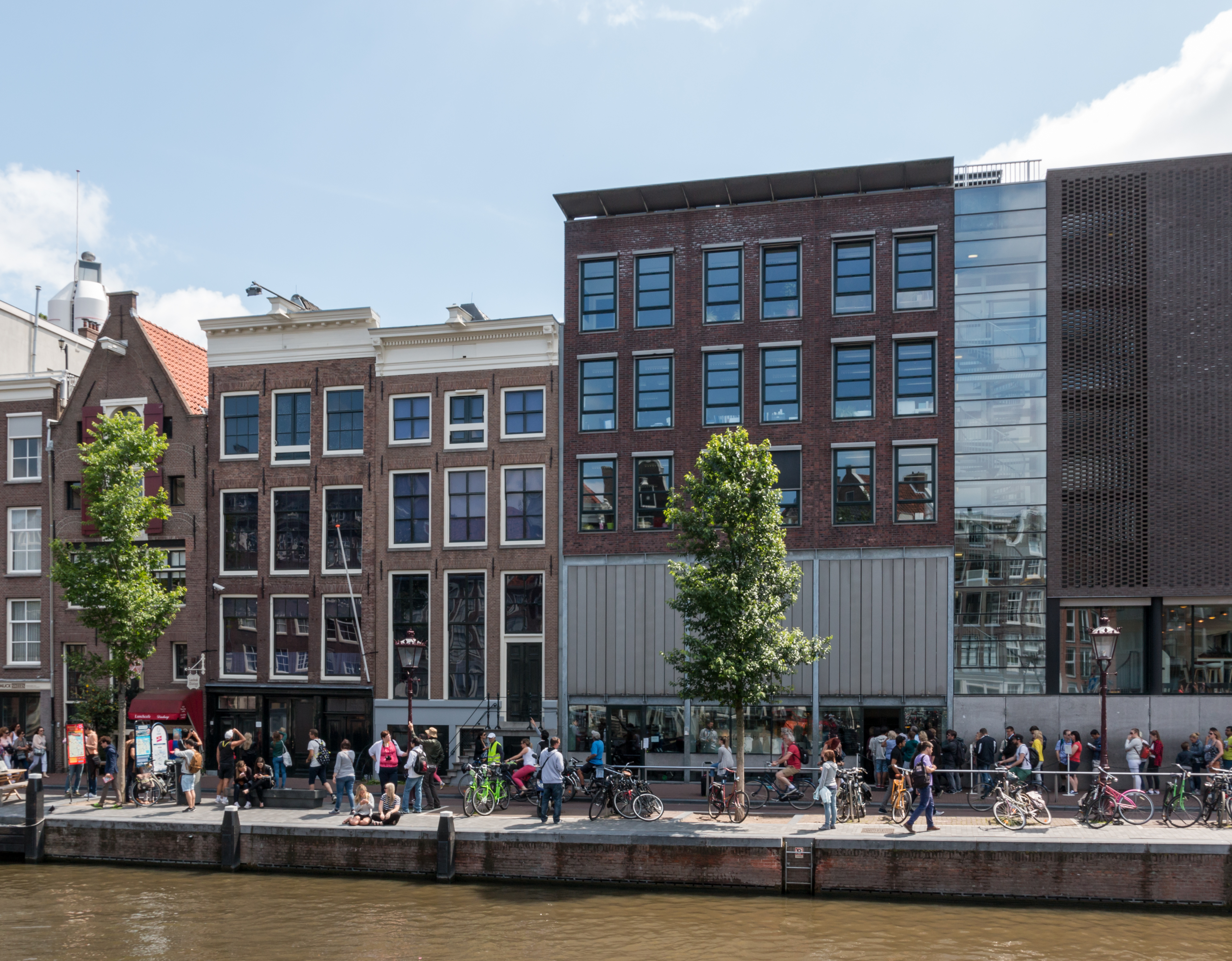
Anne Frank House in Amsterdam

The list of most visited museums in the Netherlands contains the museums in the Netherlands with more than 250,000 visitors per year. Fourteen of these museums are located in Amsterdam, the country's capital.

Rank	Museum	City	Visitor count	Year
1	Van Gogh Museum	Amsterdam	2,260,000	2017
2	Rijksmuseum	Amsterdam	2,160,000	2017
3	Anne Frank House	Amsterdam	1,266,000	2017
4	EYE Film Institute Netherlands	Amsterdam	751,100	2017
5	Stedelijk Museum Amsterdam	Amsterdam	680,000	2017
6	Sexmuseum Amsterdam	Amsterdam	675,000	2015
7	NEMO Science Museum	Amsterdam	670,000	2017
8	Kunstmuseum Den Haag	The Hague	560,000	2016
9	Netherlands Open Air Museum	Arnhem	532.000	2016
10	Noordbrabants Museum	's-Hertogenbosch	510,000	2016
11	H'ART Museum	Amsterdam	503,000	2017
12	Amsterdam Museum	Amsterdam	475,000	2017
13	Railway Museum	Utrecht	424,000	2016
14	Mauritshuis	The Hague	410,000	2016
15	Naturalis	Leiden	400,000	2016
16	Moco Museum	Amsterdam	400,000	2017
17	Joods Cultureel Kwartier	Amsterdam	370,000	2016
18	Het Loo Palace	Apeldoorn	356,386	2015
19	Nederlands Scheepvaartmuseum	Amsterdam	348,000	2017
20	Kröller-Müller Museum	Otterlo	345,000	2016
21	Groninger Museum	Groningen	290,000	2016
22	Centraal Museum	Utrecht	290,000	2016
23	Museum de Fundatie	Zwolle	285,000	2016
24	Museum Boijmans Van Beuningen	Rotterdam	280,000	2016
25	De Haar Castle	Utrecht	280,000	2017
26	Rembrandt House Museum	Amsterdam	265,000	2017
27	Royal Palace of Amsterdam	Amsterdam	258,000	2017

In addition, the entire group of separate museums and windmills in the rural Zaanse Schans area, northwest of Amsterdam, attracted 2,200,000 tourists in 2017. (Note: This figure includes all tourists visiting the Zaanse Schans#Attractions and Zaanse Schans#List of windmills, counting the entire large area as a single entry. For one example, per the available 2017 figures, the Zaans Museum itself only had 142,000 visitors.)

== See also ==
- List of museums in the Netherlands
- List of most visited art museums in the world
