= Museum of Eroticism =

French sex museum in Paris

Coordinates: 48°53′1.2″N 2°20′1.5″E

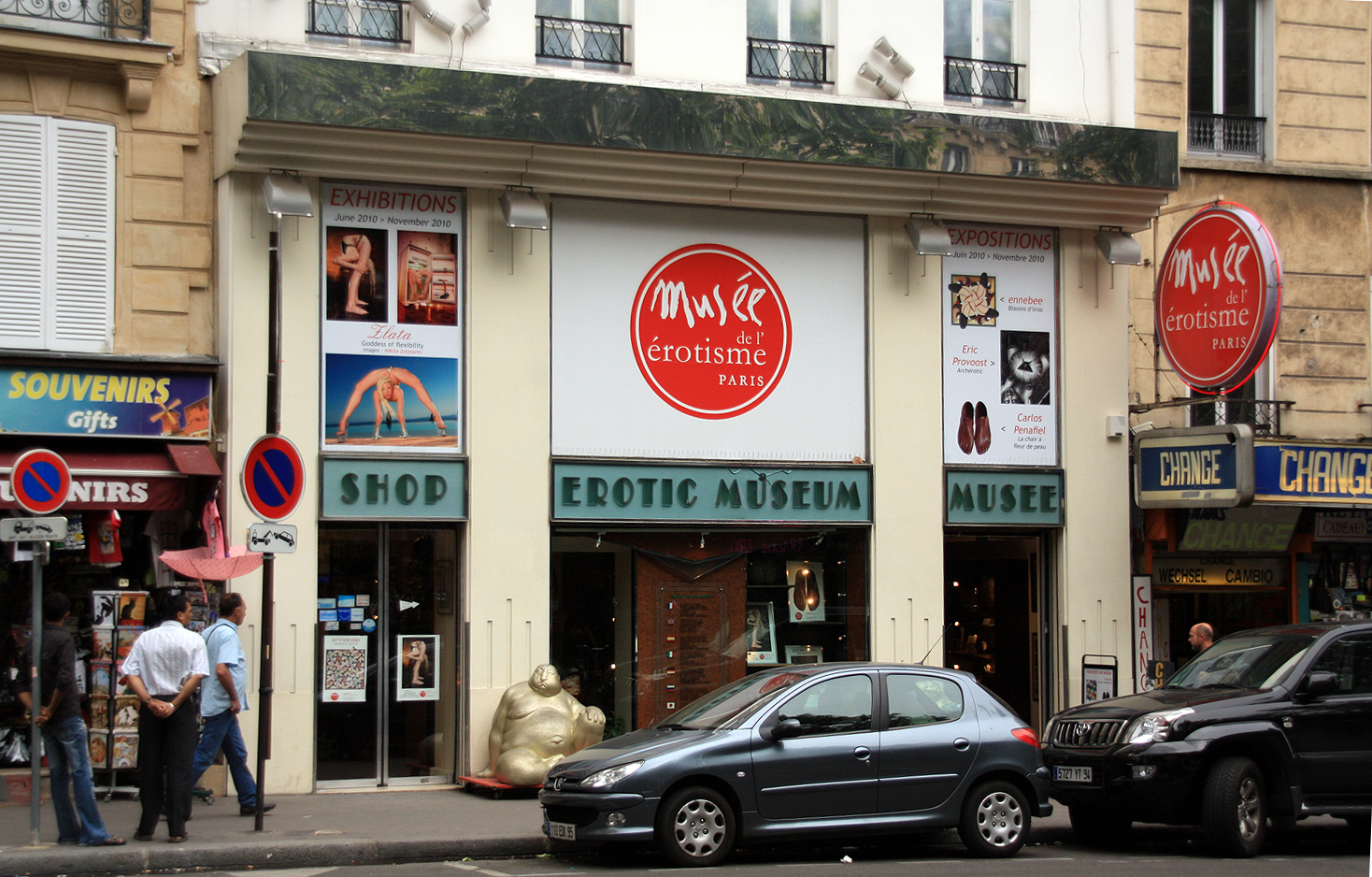
Musée de l'érotisme, 72 boulevard de Clichy in the 18th arrondissement

Museum of Eroticism (French: Musée de l'érotisme) was a sex museum in Paris devoted to the erotic art collections of antique dealer Alain Plumey and French teacher Jo Khalifa. It opened on 8 November 1997, and closed its doors on November 7, 2016.

== History ==
Founded in 1997, the museum was situated in the Pigalle district of Paris, at 72 Boulevard de Clichy, around 100m from the Moulin Rouge. The building was a former cabaret venue. The collection ranged from the ancient religious art of India, Japan and Africa right up to contemporary art with an erotic focus. There were five floors, including a basement exhibition. One floor was devoted to the history of maisons closes, the legal brothels of the 19th and early 20th century. The museum contained around 2000 exhibits. Children under 16 were not allowed in the museum.

The film Polisson et galipettes was shown; it is a collection of pornographic shorts formerly exhibited in the maisons closes. The upper two floors had revolving exhibitions, mainly of contemporary artists. It was visited by the main character in the novel Merde Actually, the sequel to A Year in the Merde.

In 2013, erotic artist Namio Harukawa exhibited "Garden of Domina" at the museum, which featured art of dominatrixes facesitting on submissive males.

After the owner of the building refused to renew the lease, the museum closed to the public on November 6, 2016, and the entire collection was auctioned off.

== Gallery ==
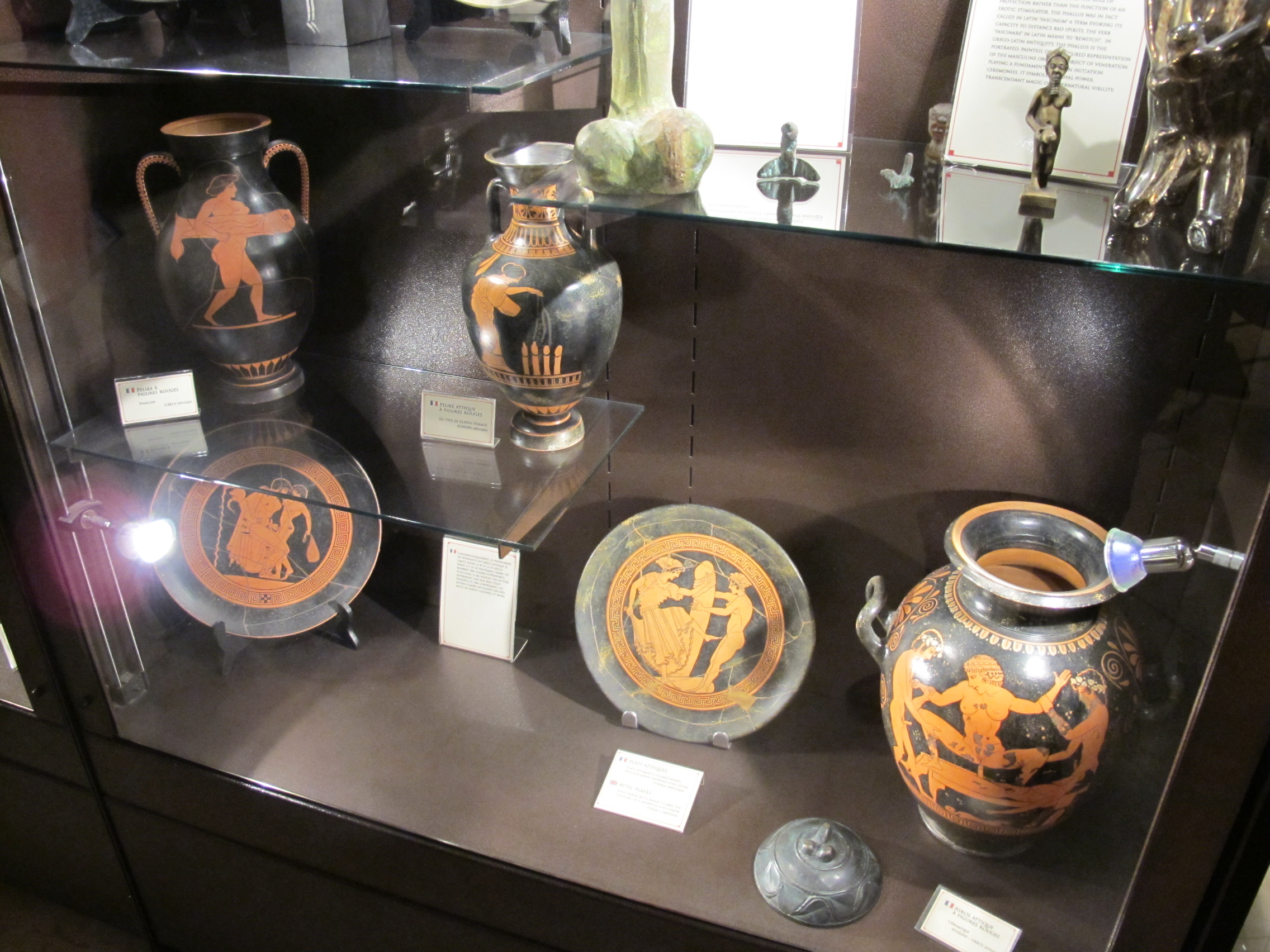
Multiple objects related to sexuality with five pieces of pottery from ancient Greece

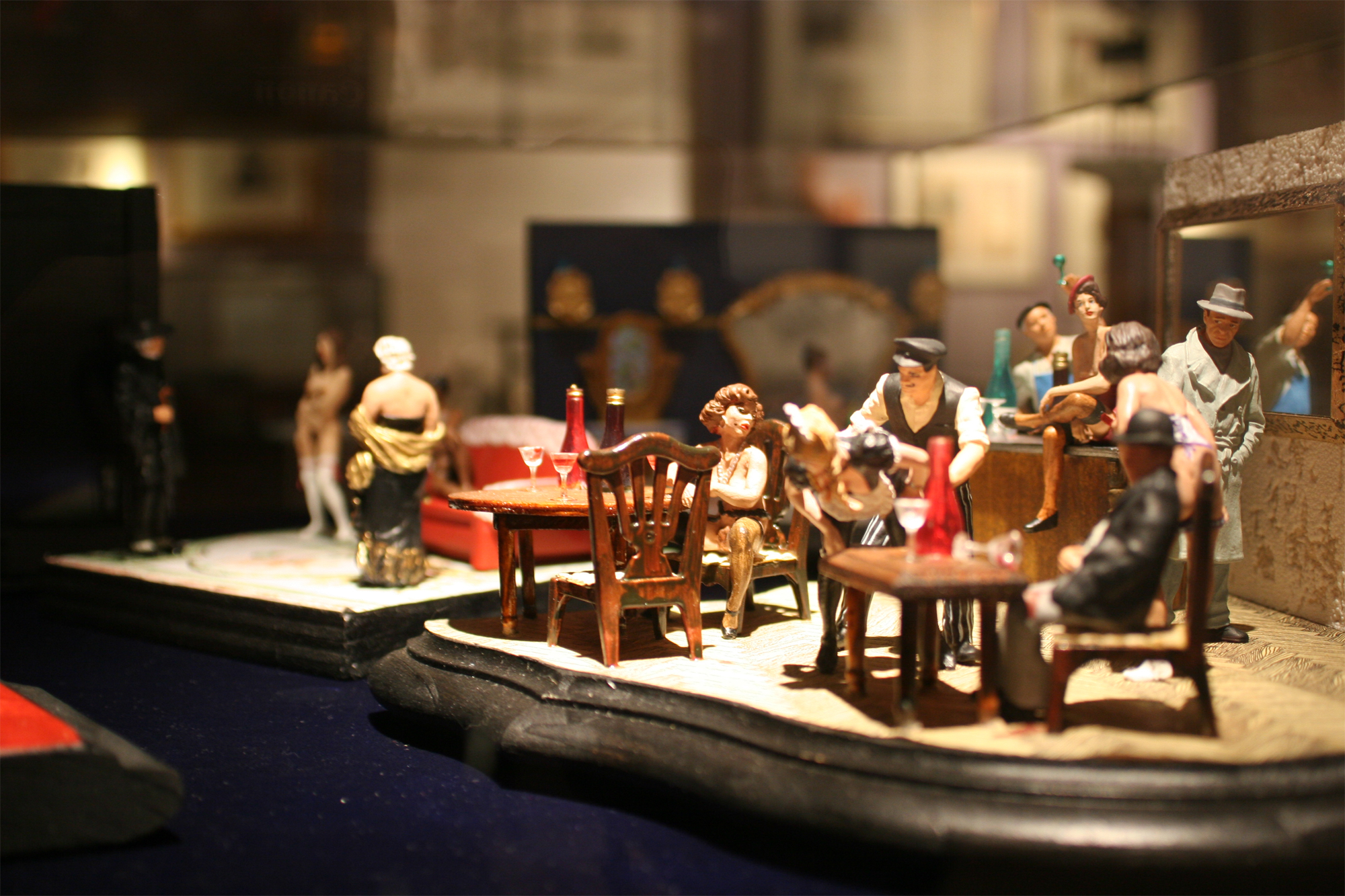
A miniature erotic scene at the museum

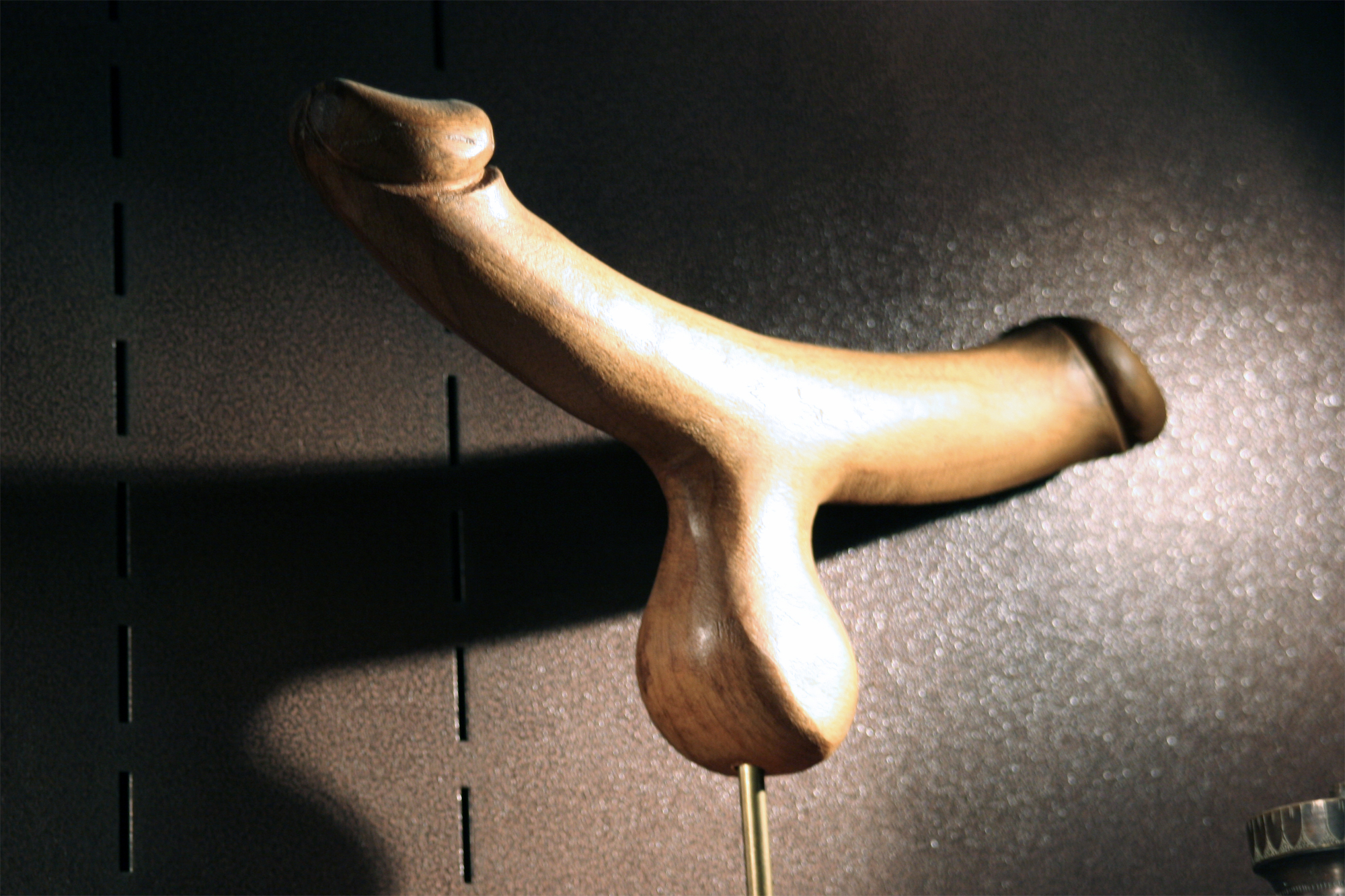
A phallic carving on display at the Erotic Museum, Paris

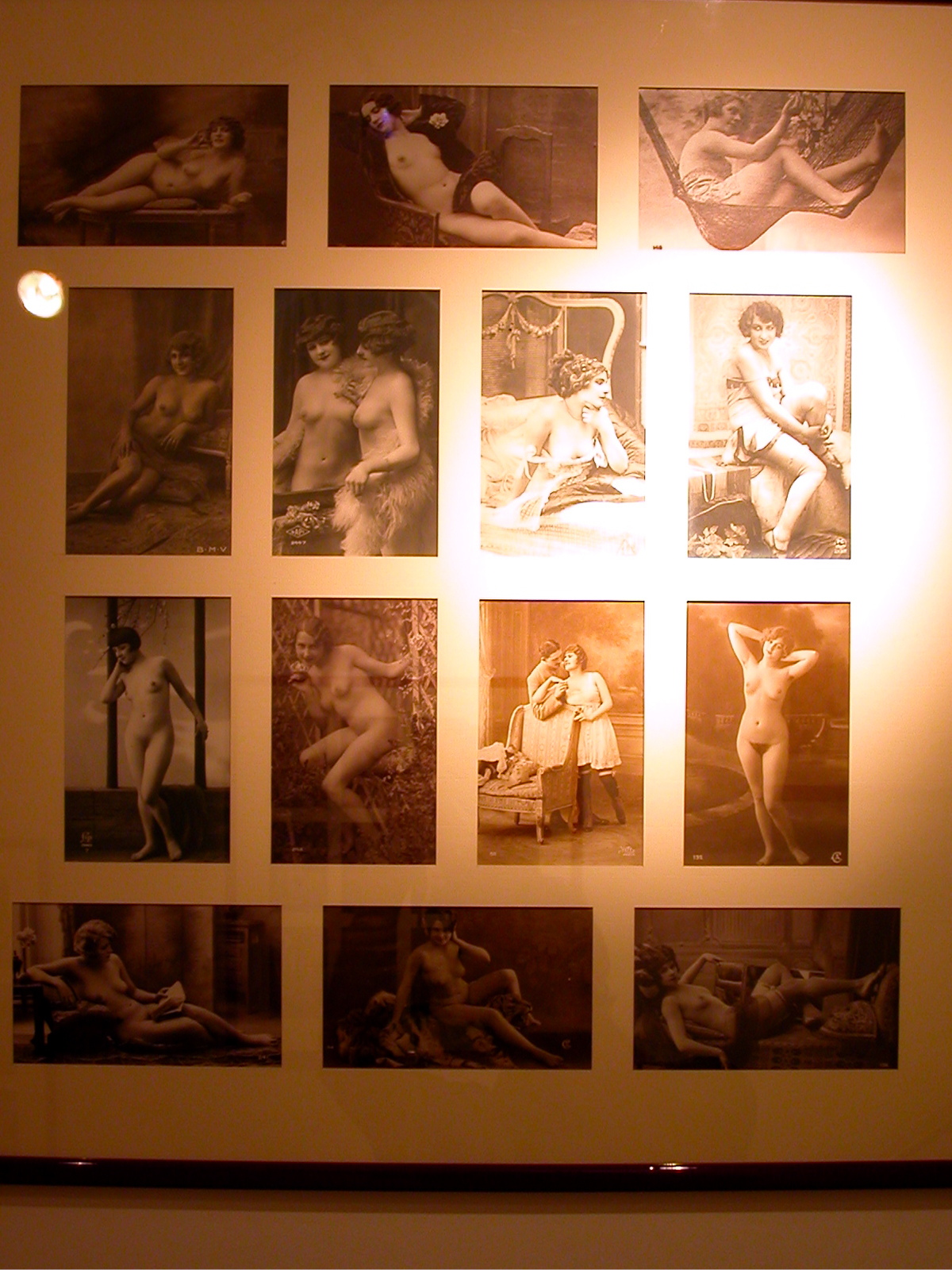
Erotic photos

== See also ==
- List of museums in Paris
- List of sex museums
