= Kitan Club =

Japanese post-war SM magazine

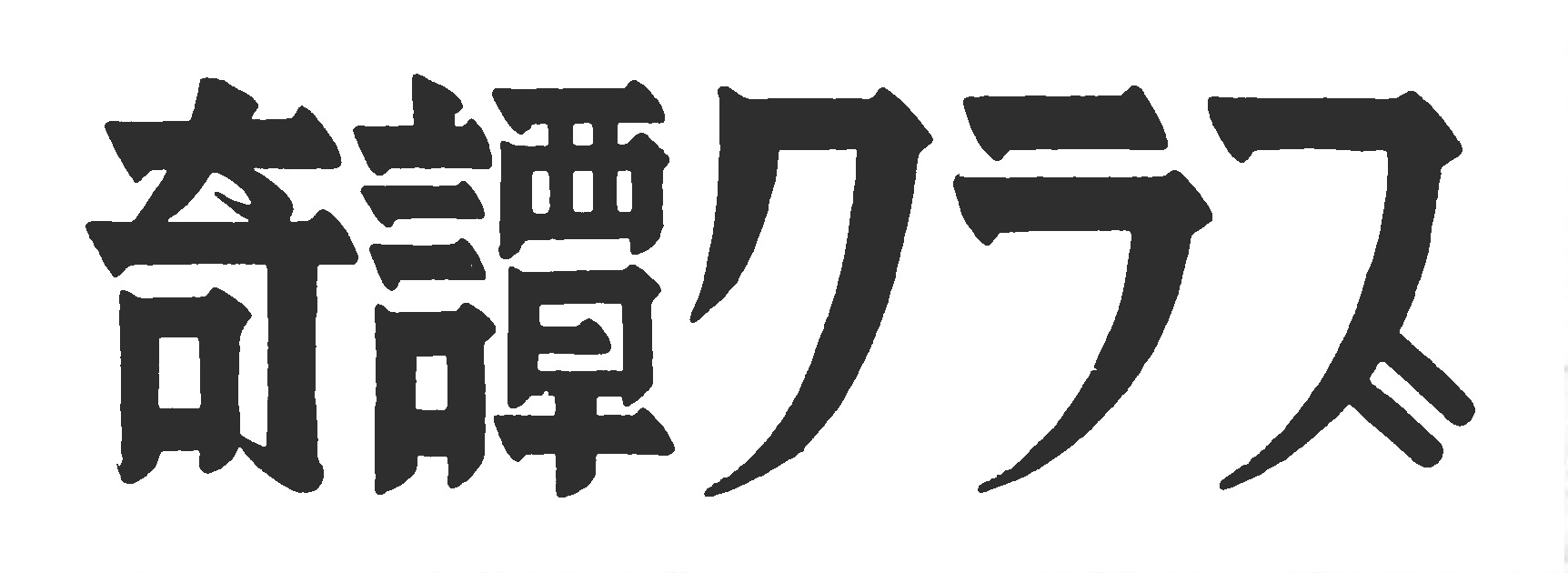

- Front cover of the January 1969 issue
- Categories: Fetish magazine
- Frequency: Monthly
- First issue: 1947
- Final issue: 1975
- Country: Japan
- Based in: Osaka
- Language: Japanese

Kitan Club (奇譚クラブ; lit. "Strange Story Club") was a Japanese post-war monthly pulp magazine that published from 1947 to 1975. From 1952 onward, it published articles, drawings and photographs on sadomasochistic themes, including images of Japanese bondage. The magazine's depiction of bondage was a factor in the popularization of Japanese bondage during the 1950s.

The artist Minomura Kou, also known as Kita Reiko, was one of the editors of the magazine responsible for the reframing of the magazine as a fetish publication.

The fetish artist Namio Harukawa was a contributor to the magazine, which published some of his earliest work. The magazine also published the art of the American artist John Willie.
