= Coprophilia =

Sexual paraphilia involving feces

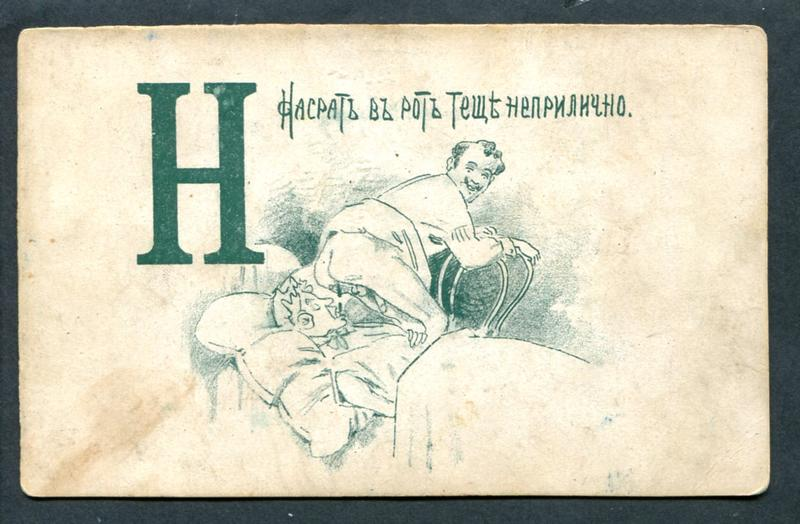
Russian coprophiliac erotica depicting defecation on a sleeping victim, one definition of the term "Hot Karl"

Coprophilia (from Greek κόπρος, kópros 'excrement' and φιλία, philía 'liking, fondness'), also called scatophilia or scat (Greek: σκατά, skatá 'feces'), is the paraphilia involving sexual arousal and pleasure from feces.

== Research ==
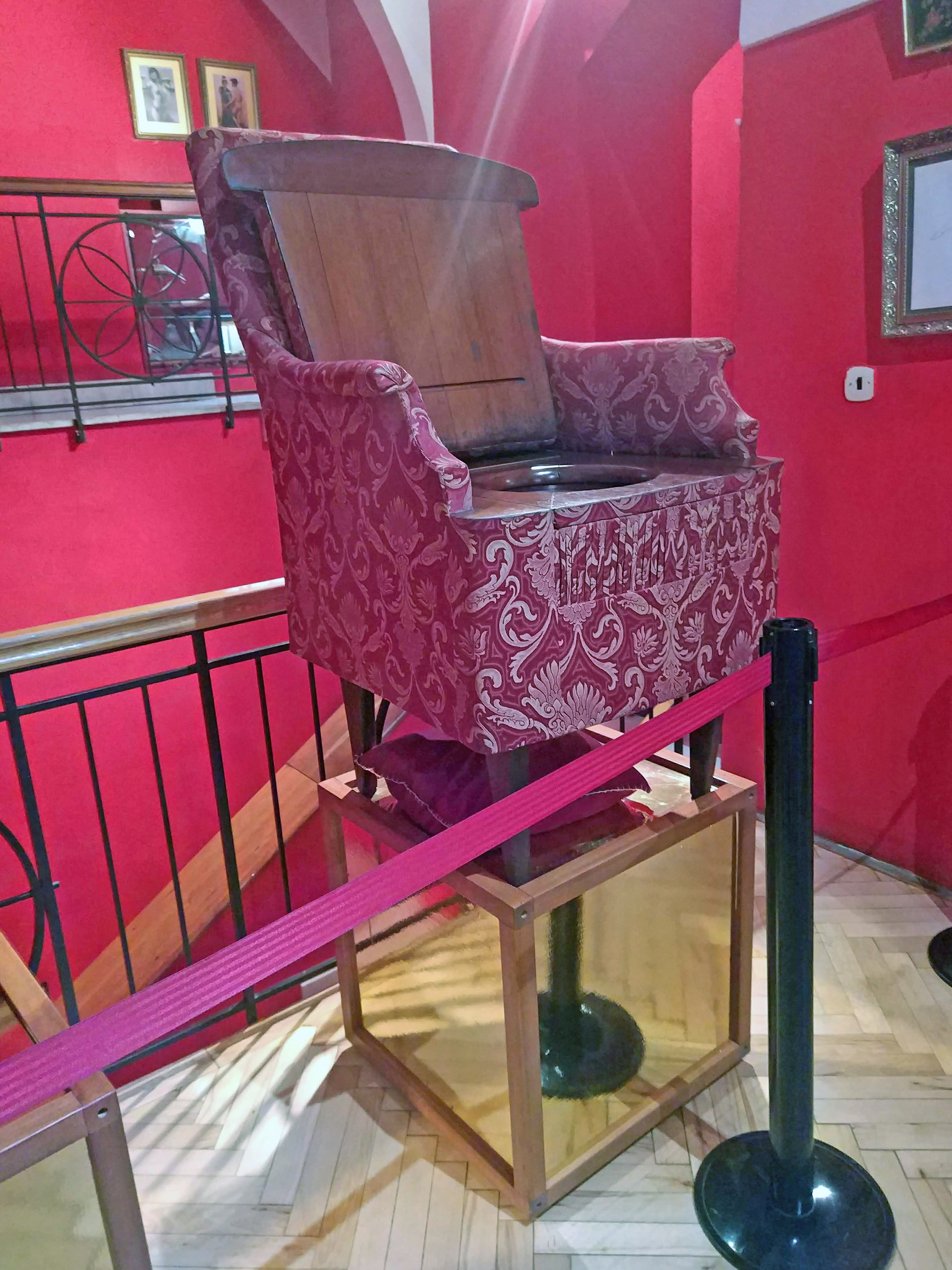
Chair with a toilet seat for use in coprophagy activities, Sex Machines Museum, Prague

In the Diagnostic and Statistical Manual of Mental Disorders (DSM), published by the American Psychiatric Association, it is classified under 302.89—Paraphilia NOS (Not Otherwise Specified) and has no diagnostic criteria other than a general statement about paraphilias that says "the diagnosis is made if the behavior, sexual urges, or fantasies cause clinically significant distress or impairment in social, occupational, or other important areas of functioning". Furthermore, the DSM-IV-TR notes, "Fantasies, behaviors, or objects are paraphilic only when they lead to clinically significant distress or impairment (e.g. are obligatory, result in sexual dysfunction, require participation of nonconsenting individuals, lead to legal complications, interfere with social relationships)".

Although there may be no connection between coprophilia and sadomasochism (SM), the limited data on the former comes from studies of the latter. A 1999 study of 164 males in Finland from two SM clubs found that 18.2% had engaged in coprophilia; 3% as a sadist only, 6.1% as a masochist only, and 9.1% as both. In the study pool 18% of heterosexuals and 17% of homosexuals had tried coprophilia, showing no statistically significant difference between heterosexuals and homosexuals. In a separate article analyzing 12 men who engaged in bestiality, an additional analysis of an 11-man subgroup revealed that six had engaged in coprophilic behavior, compared with only one in the matched control group consisting of 12 SM-oriented males who did not engage in bestiality.

== Society and culture ==
A table in Larry Townsend's The Leatherman's Handbook II (the 1983 second edition; the 1972 first edition did not include this list) which is generally considered authoritative states that a brown handkerchief is a symbol for coprophilia in the handkerchief code, which is employed usually among gay male casual-sex seekers or BDSM practitioners in the United States, Canada, Australia and Europe. Wearing the handkerchief on the left indicates the top, dominant, or active partner; right the bottom, submissive, or passive partner. However, negotiation with a prospective partner remains important because, as Townsend noted, people may wear hankies of any color "only because the idea of the hankie turns them on" or "may not even know what it means".

The Cleveland steamer is a colloquial term for a form of coprophilia, where someone defecates on their partner's chest. The term received news attention through its use in a U.S. Congress staff hoax email and being addressed by the United States Federal Communications Commission.

Hot Karl is sexual slang referring to one of several purported acts involving feces. It variously means an act of defecating on one's sexual partner, defecating on someone who is asleep, or defecating on someone's face while covered in plastic wrap. According to Indian forensic pathologist Anil Aggrawal, it is a synonym for a Cleveland steamer and is part of a coprophilia vocabulary that also includes the Dirty Sanchez. The term was adopted as a name by rapper Hot Karl.

Dirty Sanchez is a purported sex act which consists of feces purposely being smeared onto a partner's upper lip. The New Partridge Dictionary of Slang and Unconventional English says, "This appears to have been contrived with the intention to provoke shock rather than actually as a practice, although, no doubt, some have or will experiment." Columnist Gustavo Arellano of Ask a Mexican contends the term evokes the stereotypical mustache of a Mexican. The term for the sex act entered British gay cant Polari in the 1960s.

== See also ==
- 2 Girls 1 Cup
- Anilingus
- Ass to mouth – removing the penis from the passive partner's anus followed by its immediate insertion into either their mouth, or another person's.
- Coprophagia – the consumption of feces
- Scatology
- Urolagnia (also known as urophilia) – a paraphilia involving sexual pleasure from urine
- Eproctophilia – a paraphilia involving sexual arousal from flatulence
