= Museum Erotica =

Sex museum in Copenhagen, Denmark

Coordinates: 55.68°N 12.5792°E

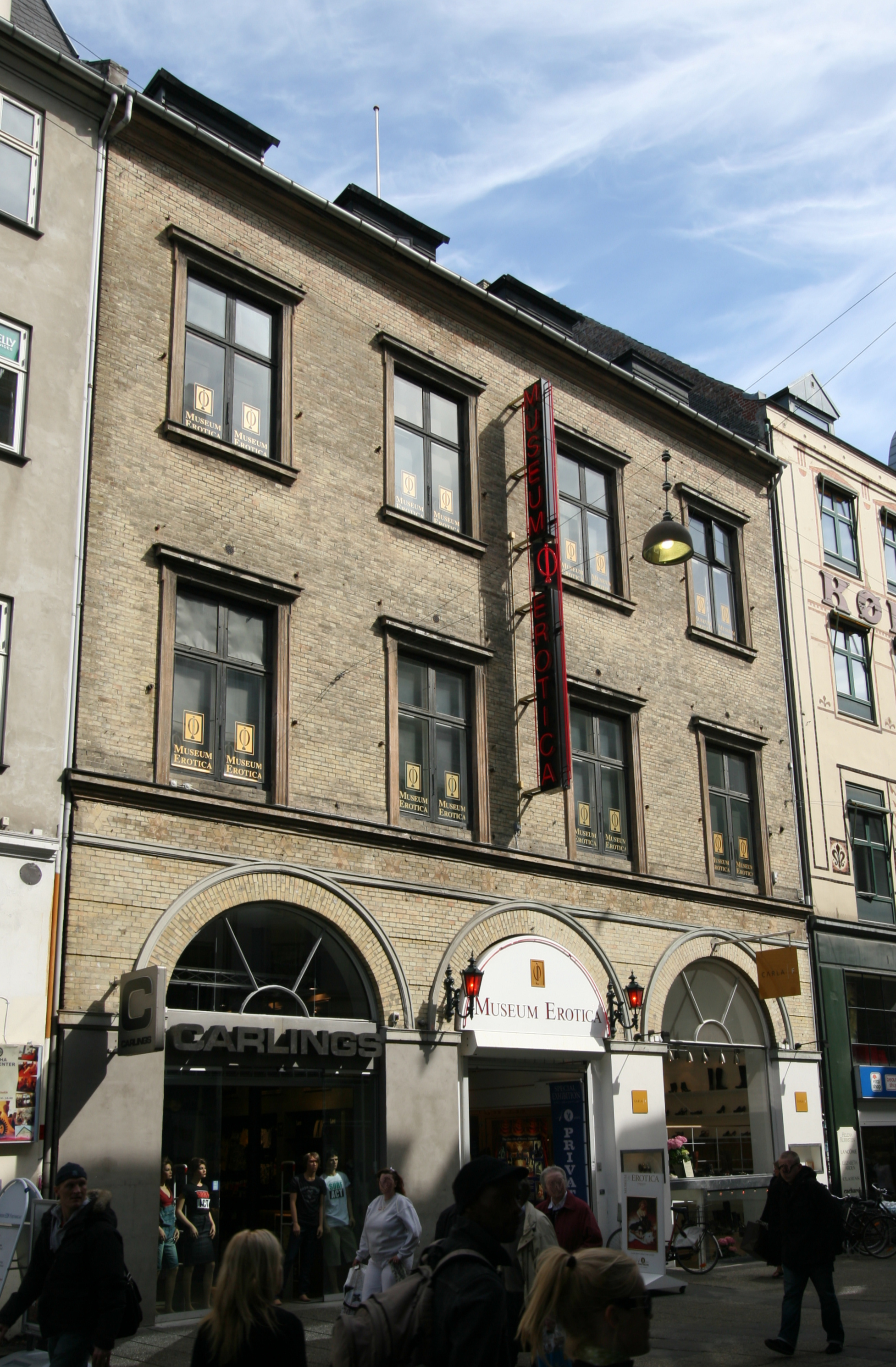
Museum Erotica

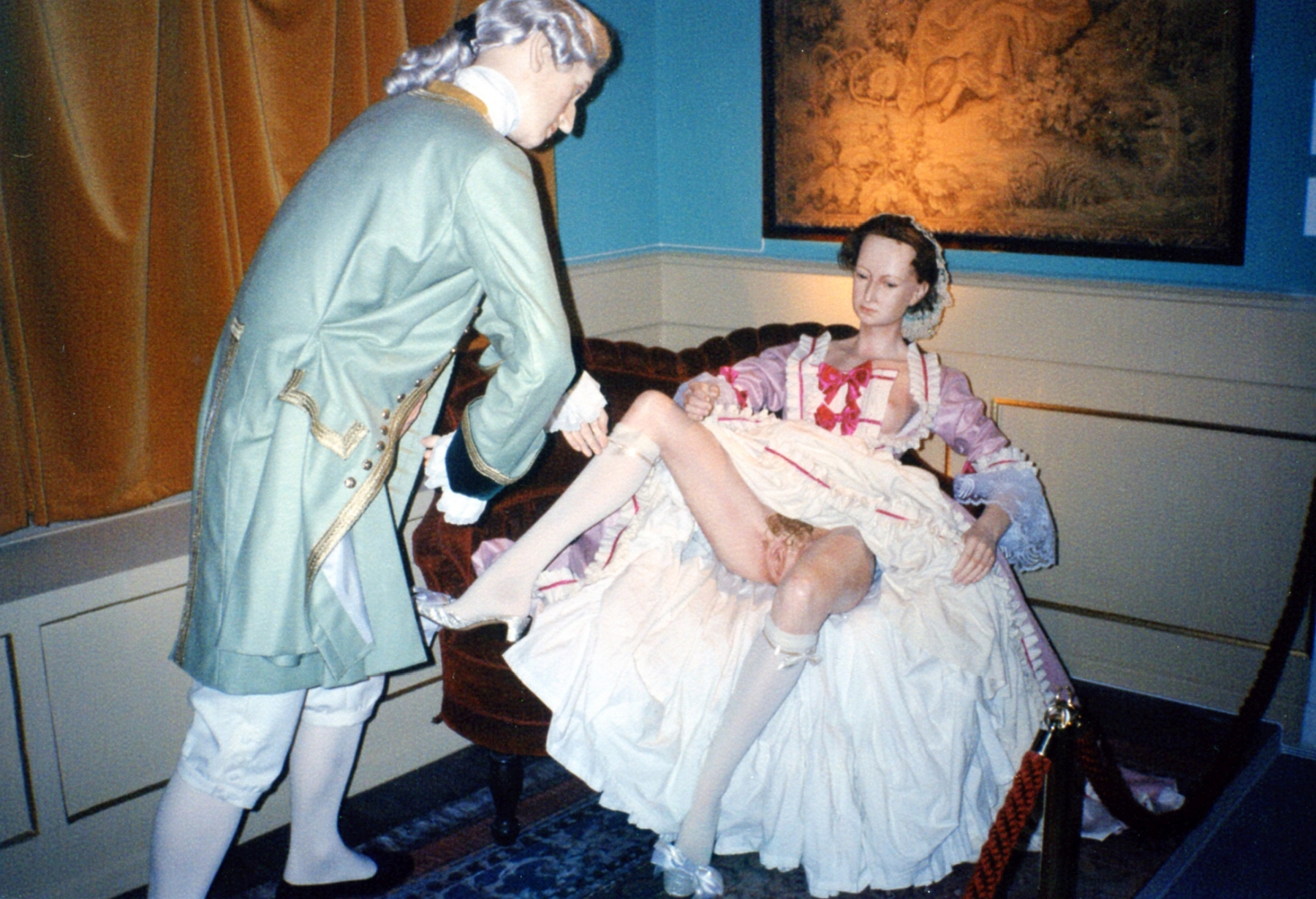
The "Fanny Hill" exhibit

Museum Erotica was a sex museum in Copenhagen, Denmark, located just off of Strøget, Copenhagen's main shopping street. The museum was founded by director/photographer Ole Ege and business manager Kim Clausen. It originally opened in 1992 at Vesterbrogade 31 in Copenhagen. On May 14, 1994, it reopened at Købmagergade 24, where it remained until it closed in March 2009, following the sudden, unexpected death of Kim Clausen in 2008, and then the financial recession.

The museum claimed to have had one million visitors. The museum often described itself as having "illustrated some of the sex life of Homo sapiens", which reflects its very historic and holistic approach to its exhibitions.

The walk through the museum took a visitor through many exhibits in roughly chronological order. A good deal of written commentary in English and Danish explained and augmented many of the items on display.

There were extensive exhibitions on the beginning of erotic photography, a room with Playboy-centerfolds and other American pinups, and a special exhibition on Marilyn Monroe, among other things. One of the final displays in Museum Erotica was a small room with a sofa opposite a large wall of small television screens each showing a different porno video. The selections reflected the eclectic nature of the museum's displays.

== See also ==
- List of sex museums
