= Beate Uhse Erotic Museum =

Former sex museum in Berlin, Germany

Coordinates: 52°30′19.83″N 13°19′52.98″E

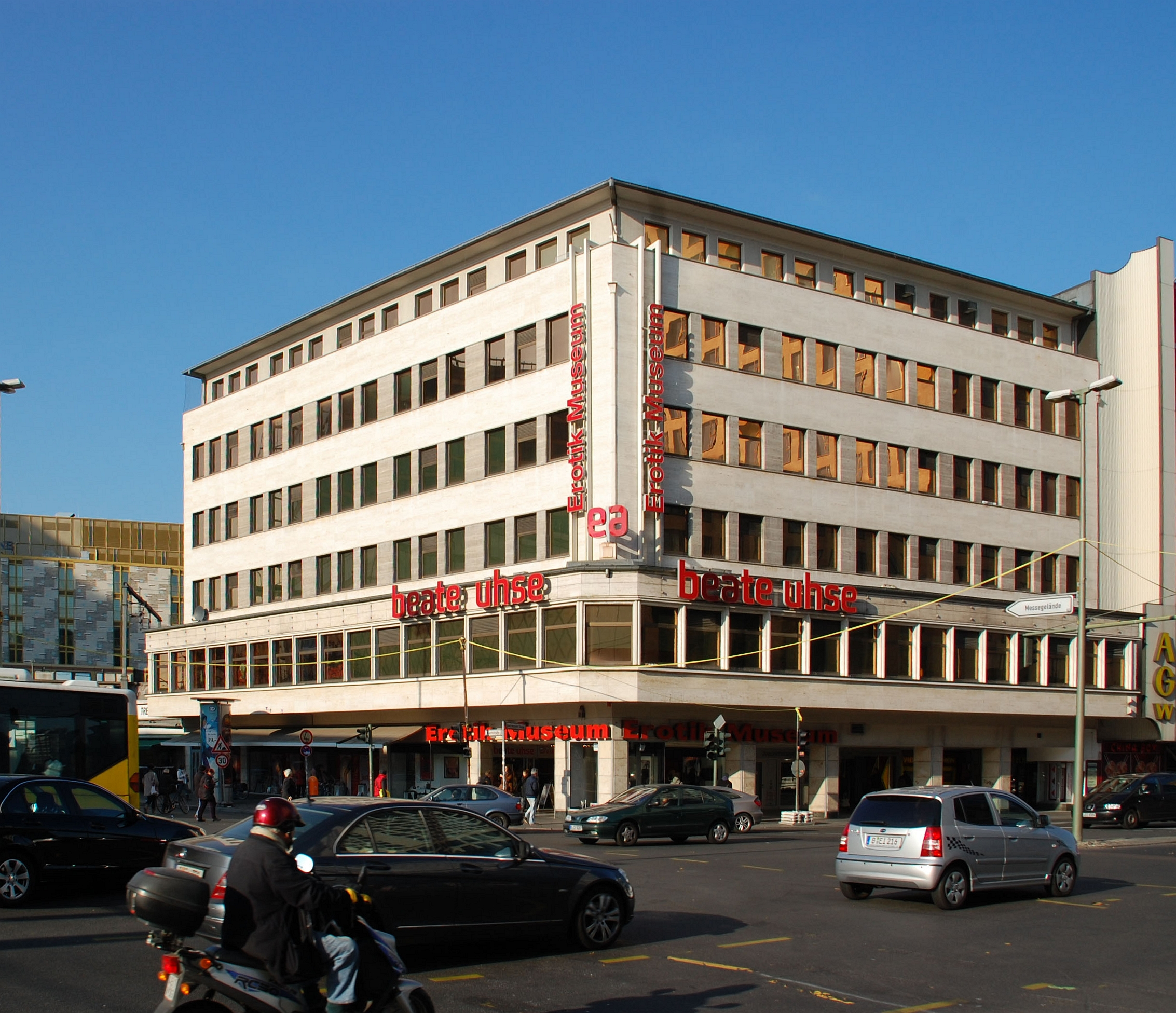
- Established: 19 January 1996; 30 years ago
- Dissolved: 14 September 2014; 12 years ago
- Location: Joachimstaler Straße 4, 10623 Berlin, Germany
- Website: erotikmuseum.beate-uhse.com

The Beate Uhse Erotic Museum (German: Beate Uhse Erotik-Museum) (1996 – 2014) was a sex museum in the Charlottenburg district of Berlin, Germany.

The museum was opened in 1996 near Berlin Zoologischer Garten station by Beate Uhse, the early stunt pilot and entrepreneur, who in 1962 started the world's first sex shop. The collection featured historic Asian and European erotic art including several lithographs by Heinrich Zille as well as early pornographic films. It claimed to be "the world's largest erotic museum."

The museum was closed in September 2014. Initially the museum was looking for new premises, but due to the market development in Berlin the museum never reopened. For the exhibits, a loss in value of €1.2 million was recorded in the 2015 annual report.

== See also ==
- List of sex museums
