= Facesitting =

Sexual activity

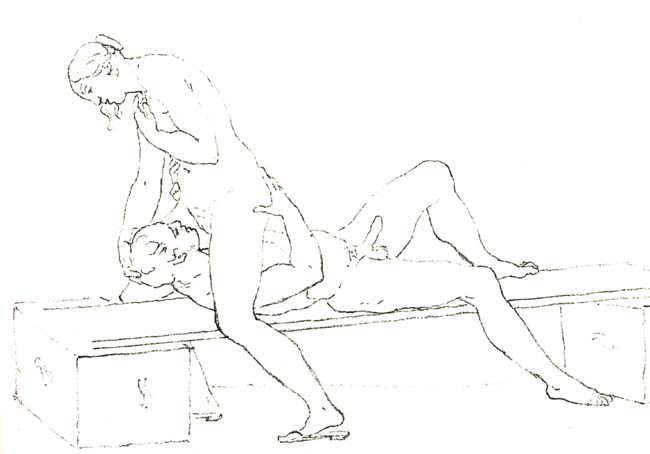
A sketch by Italian painter Francesco Hayez depicting facesitting

Facesitting, also known as queening or kinging, is a sexual practice with one partner sitting over the other's face, sometimes allowing for oral–genital or oral–anal contact. The sitting partner may face in either direction.

== Components ==
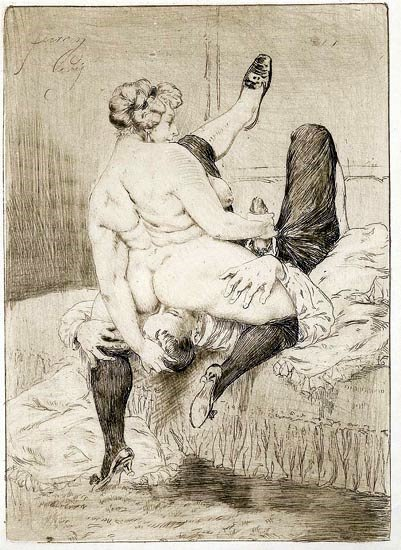
Facesitting, Heinrich Lossow (1843–1897)

Facesitting is common among dominant and submissive individuals, for demonstrating superiority and for sexual gratification. The full-weight body-pressure, smothering, moisture, body odors, and darkness can be perceived as powerful sexual attractions or compulsions. The person sat upon may be in bondage, sexually submissive, or simply held down by the body-weight of the other person. While the dominant is sitting on the submissive, the submissive might also lick their genitals while smelling their anus. In facesitting, the dominant may defecate on the submissive's face. Sometimes, the dominant will flatulate on the submissive, which is often perceived as a sexual attraction.

== Furniture ==
Facesitting using a queening stool

Sometimes special furniture is used, such as a "queening stool" or "smotherbox". A queening stool is a low seat which fits over the submissive's face and contains an opening to allow oral-genital and/or oral-anal stimulation of the domme while seated.

The position allows the pelvic floor muscles (PFM) to relax and therefore partly exposing the labia minora to intimate touch. The gluteus maximus and levator ani muscles, the major muscles of the crotch, can relax and sag allowing easy access to the vagina and anus. Additionally, the stool allows for greater comfort and allows for the activity to be done for a longer period of time.

A smotherbox (or "smothering box") is a special form of queening stool which also allows the person under the seat to be locked in place, restrained by the neck as in a set of stocks. A smotherbox has two openings. One is in a vertical side of the box for the neck of the person who has their head inside the smotherbox. The other is in the top of the box to expose their face. The inside of a smotherbox is often padded to provide support for their neck and prevent their head from moving. The padding may also muffle noises from the outside, causing a relaxation effect and heightening their other senses. Smotherboxes are usually custom made pieces of furniture that may have a special significance for their users. They are sometimes made out of precious woods, with leather used for the seat.

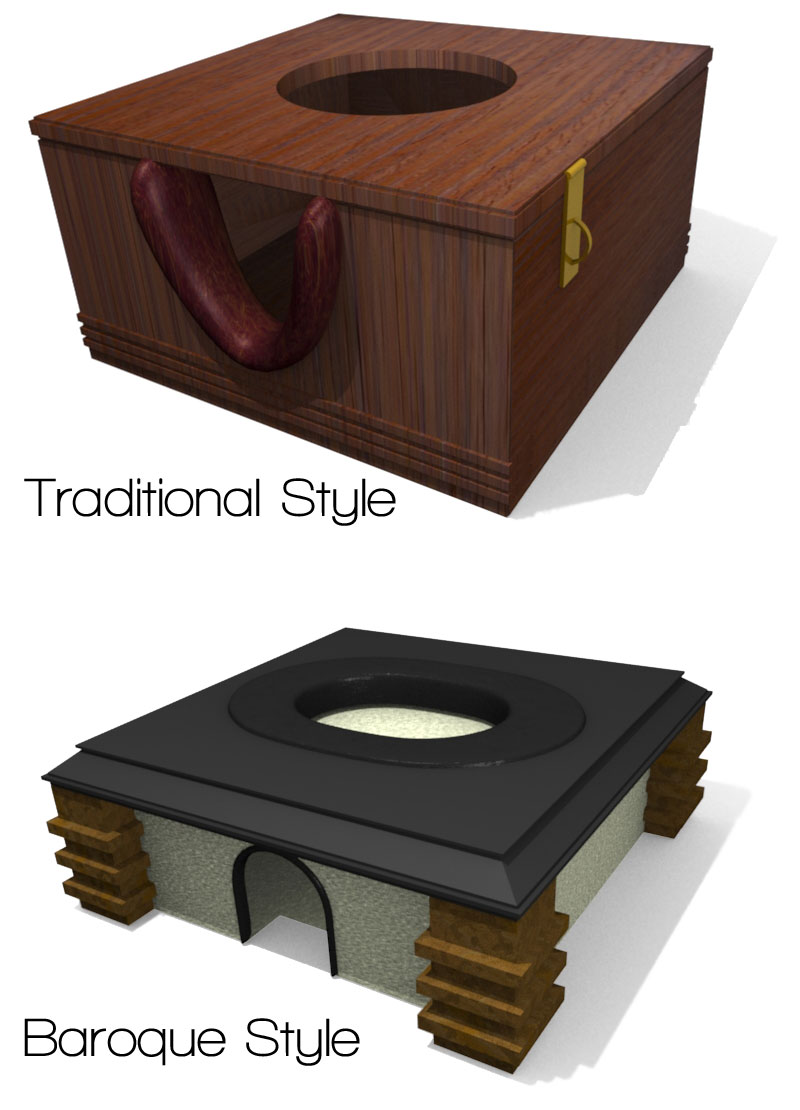
Different smotherbox designs

The smotherbox is placed on a stable surface. The cover (top half of the smotherbox) is open while the submissive lies down on their back and places their head in the box. When they are in position the cover is closed. The cover can have hinges or be a separate part. Locks may be used to emphasize the submissive position or the submissive's hands may be fastened above their head to the box. Smotherboxes may be more permanently mounted to tables or other stable objects, and the submissive restrained to that surface instead. A Queening Chair or Facesitting Throne is another variation that is popular, designed to emphasize the relative place of the domme and submissive. They can be elegant and more formal than the smotherbox.

== In popular culture ==
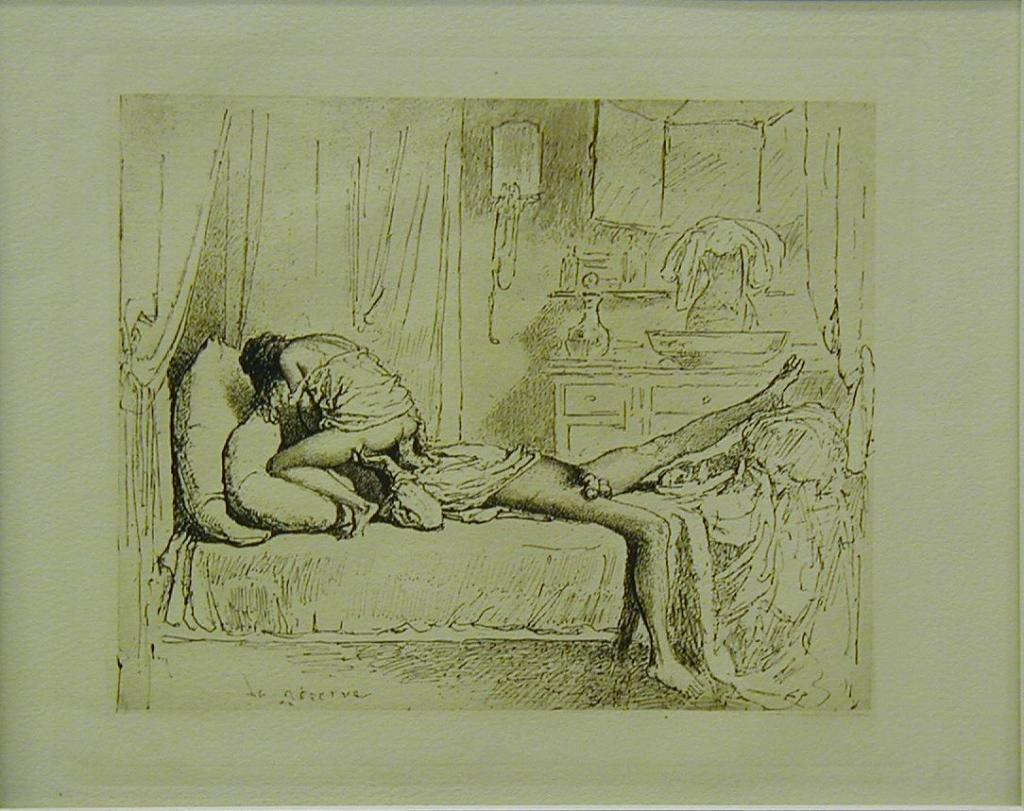
Mihály Zichy: Making love (1911)

In 1980, Monty Python recorded a humorous song, "Sit on My Face", about the pleasure of facesitting. Written by Eric Idle, the song's lyrics are sung to the melody of "Sing As We Go" by Gracie Fields. The opening gives way to multiple male voices singing "Sit on my face and tell me that you love me." The remaining lyrics contain numerous references to fellatio and cunnilingus.

The Audiovisual Media Services Regulations 2014, introduced by the British government, brought about a ban on the depiction of various sex acts in hardcore pornography on the Internet. Ostensibly, the bill sought to protect women from sex acts that were considered "violent" or "unsafe", and banned a wide variety of sex practices, including facesitting, strangulation, and fisting. This law impacted only the production of pornographic videos as opposed to acts performed privately. Protests against the law were held outside the Palace of Westminster, with protesters saying the law did not reflect the wishes of the public. In 2019, the law was overturned. In 2026 the porn site IWantClips announced they would be removing 17 categories in the UK including "Facesitting" and "BBW Facesitting", to comply with new UK legal requirements.

== See also ==
- BDSM
- Body worship
- Cunnilingus
- Dominatrix
- Erotic humiliation
- Namio Harukawa, Japanese artist who featured facesitting extensively in his work
- Maledom
- Oral sex
- Sex position
- Teabagging
