= Ass to mouth =

Sex act

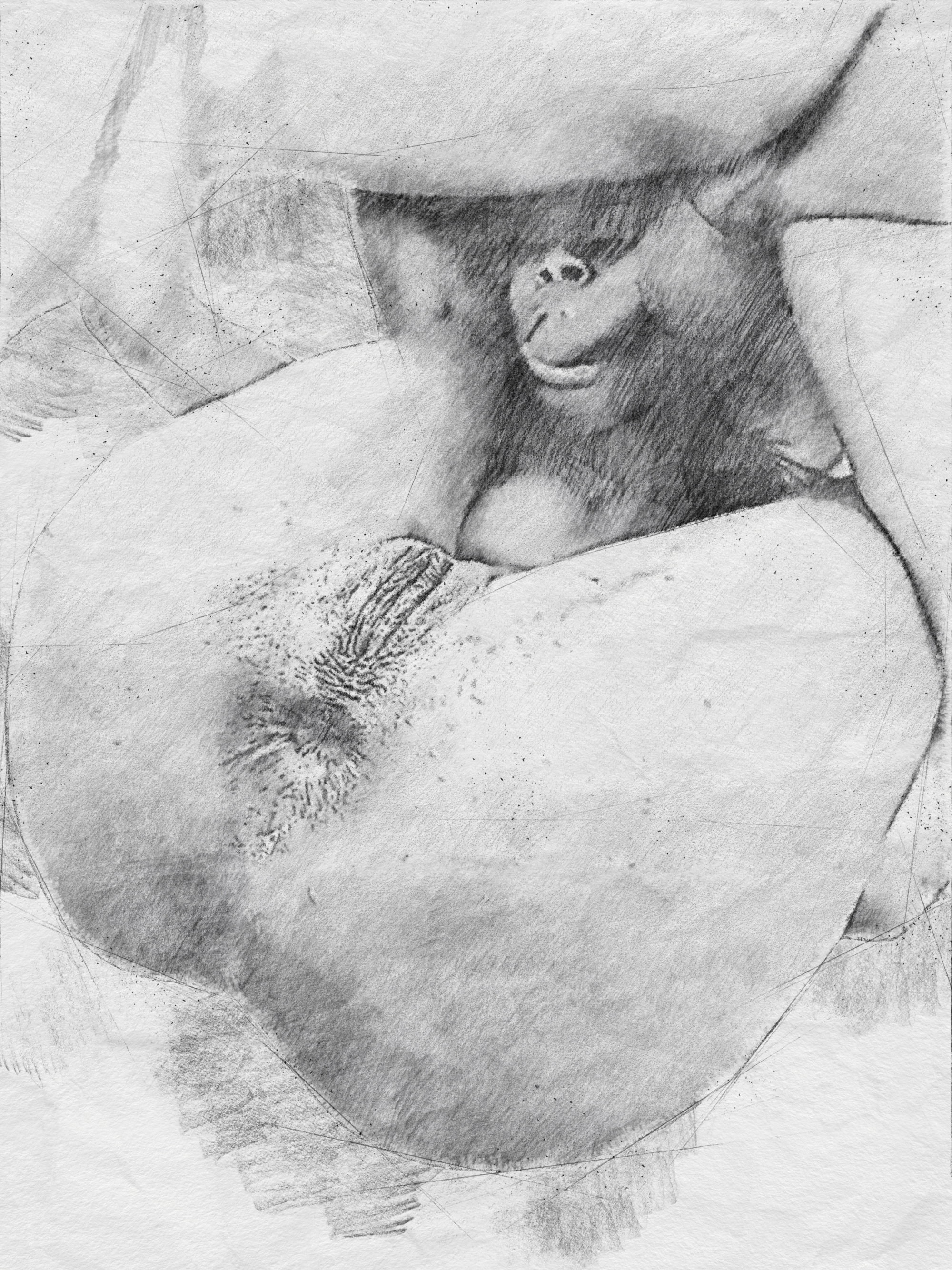
Artistic pencil illustration of ass to mouth

Ass to mouth (abbreviated as ATM or A2M in pornography) is a slang term associated with the porn industry describing oral sex immediately following anal sex. The term is primarily used to describe a sexual practice whereby an erect penis is removed from a receptive partner's anus and then directly put into their mouth, or possibly the mouth of another.

== Health concerns ==
If the recipient of ass-to-mouth is performing fellatio on a penis or object that was removed from their own rectum, the health risks are generally limited to disturbances of the gastrointestinal tract, which may proceed from introducing normal intestinal flora from the rectum to the mouth and upper digestive tract. If the recipient's ano-rectal area is infected with a sexually transmitted disease like gonorrhea, however, there is an added risk of transmitting the infection to that person's mouth or throat. Intestinal parasites and other organisms can also be carried in feces. Risk of sexually transmitted infection (STI) or parasitic transmission exists only if fecal particulate from an infected person is transmitted to the mouth of an uninfected person.

== In porn ==
Porn industry performers often use enemas before filming anal sex sequences; however, this is primarily to eliminate the possibility of any fecal matter appearing on video rather than disease prevention. Ass to mouth, along with a variant of ass to mouth called ATOGM (ass to other girl's mouth), began to appear more frequently in hardcore pornography in the early 2000s, seeing an increase in popularity over the next decade.

== See also ==
- Anilingus
- Coprophilia
- Dirty Sanchez (sexual act)
- Pegging
