= Sex Machines Museum =

Sex museum in Prague

Coordinates: 50°5′10″N 14°25′15″E

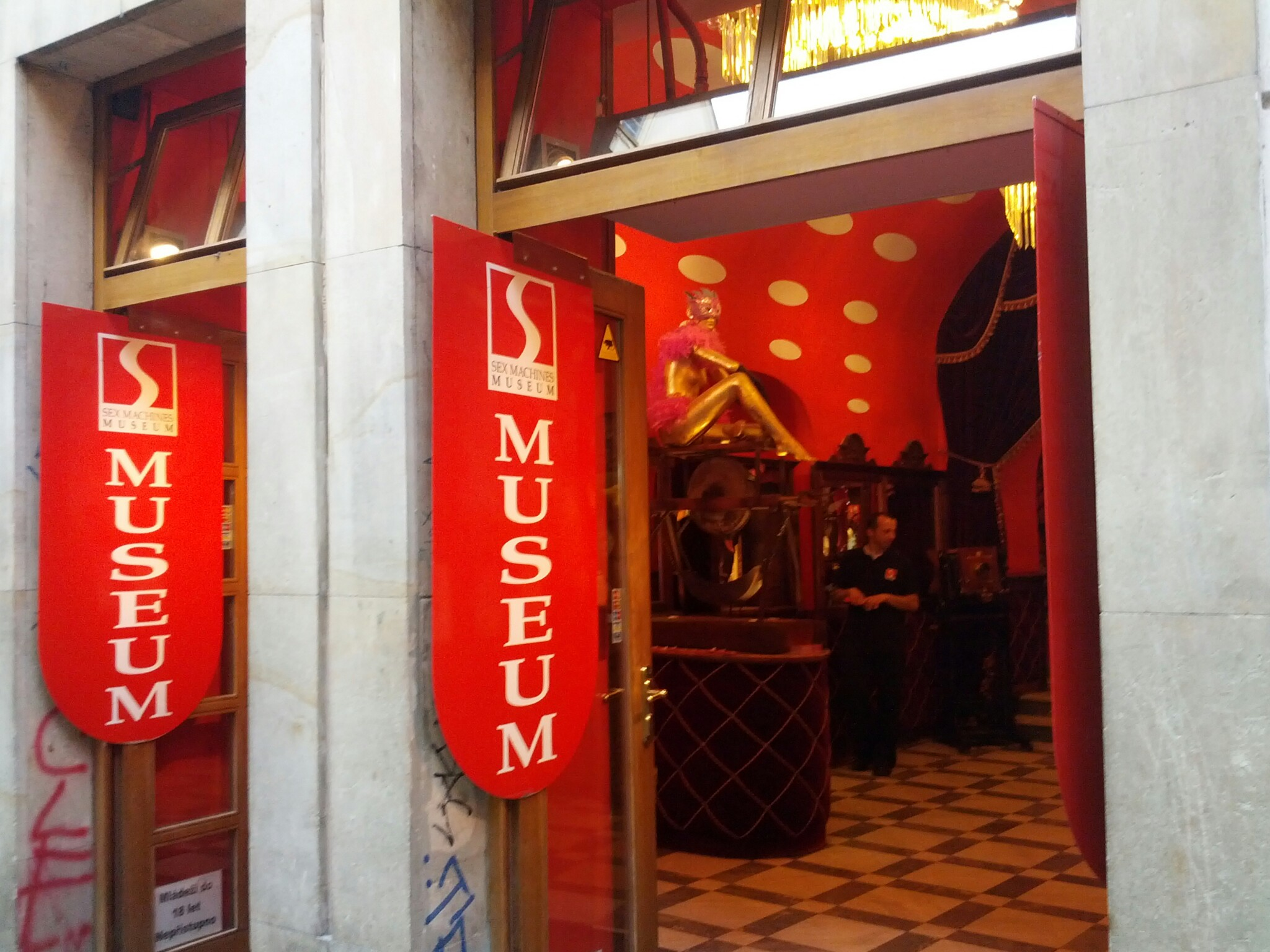
Entrance to the museum

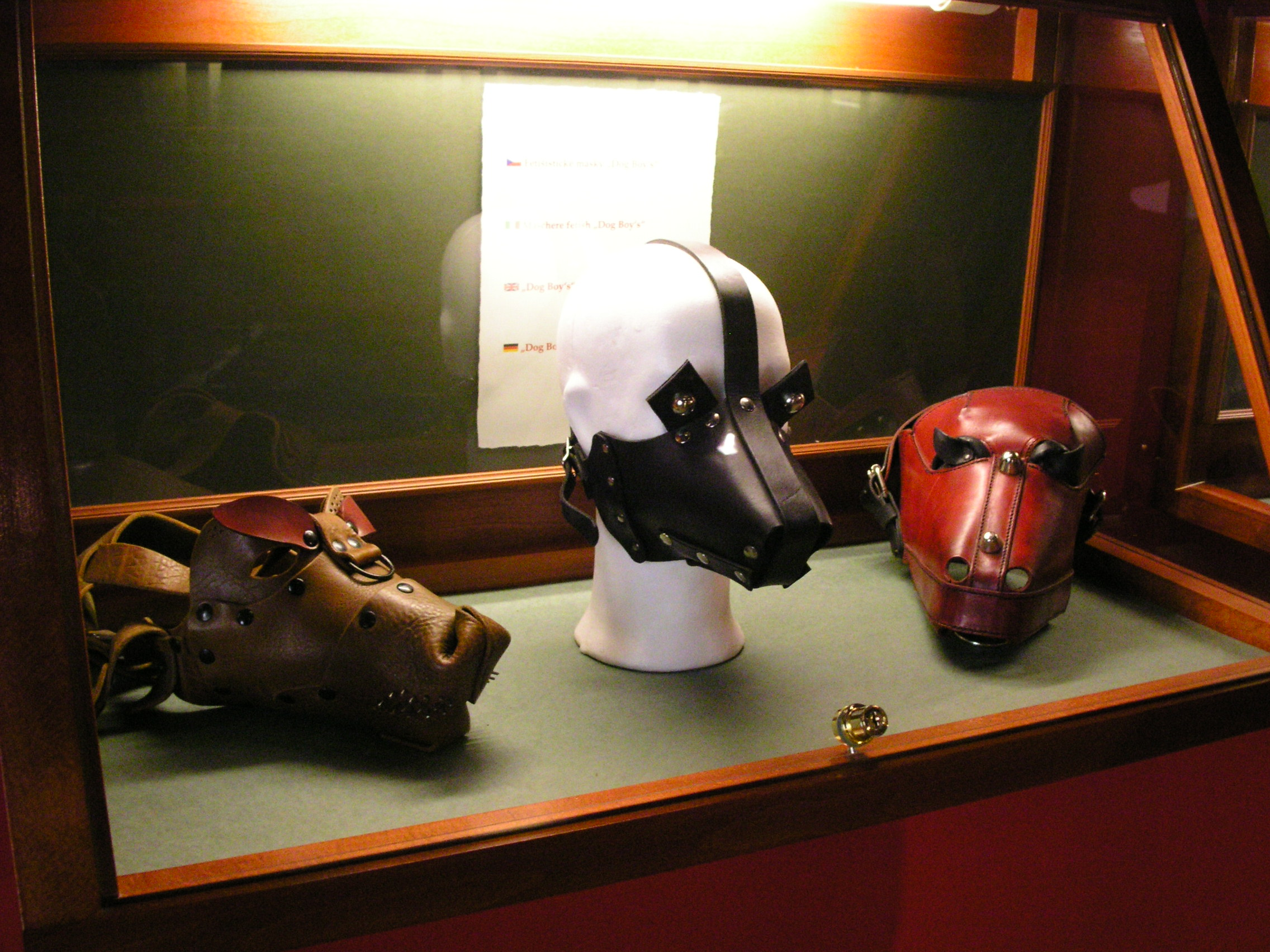
Three BDSM masks on display

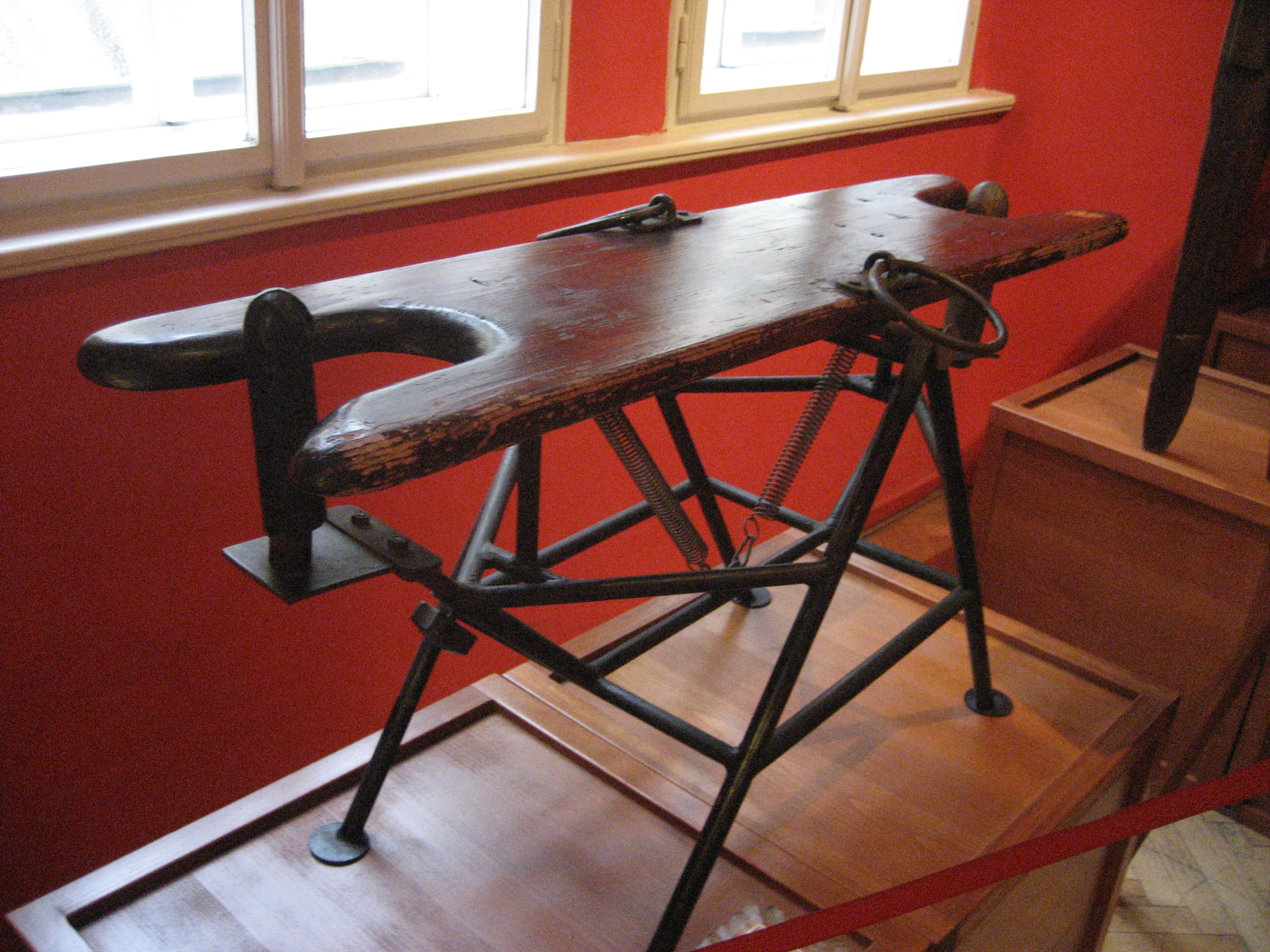
A seesaw-like device

Sex Machines Museum (abbreviated SMM) is a sex museum in Prague, Czech Republic, which has a collection of sex devices. Established in 2002, it is located near the Old Town Square. The official website of the Sex Machines Museum describes itself as "an exposition of mechanical erotic appliances, the purpose of which is to bring pleasure and allow extraordinary and unusual positions during intercourse." It is the only sex museum in the world dedicated solely to sex machines.

The three-story museum has a collection of approximately 200 gadgets, many of which are accompanied by flexible dummies for better understanding. Some of the appliances were made as early as the 16th century. Its collections include body harnesses and "copulation tables" the purpose of which were to facilitate unconventional, even weightless, sex positions, instruments for the stimulation of "penile, scrotal, anal, vaginal and clitoral tissue" including a vibrator, wicked finger-spikes, "coercive" chairs designed for "absolute domination", an Asian "Magic Box" palanquin which has sliding peepholes, throne chairs with a hole in the seat to facilitate oral sex, chastity belts with clawed teeth which dates back to the 1580s, iron corsets etc. There is an anti-masturbation appliance for boys displayed in the museum which was made in France during the 1920s. It contained an electronic ring which was placed on the penis. The ring automatically switched on when there was an erection so that the boy's parents could become aware. Shoes worn by ancient Greek prostitutes are displayed in the museum. These shoes had the sentence "follow my steps" engraved on the soles so that they could leave an imprint on the ground. It also has a collection of erotic clothing. The art gallery in SMM has collection of images pertaining to human sexuality. There is a theatrette in the museum which shows some of the world's earliest pornographic films directed in Spain during the 1920s.

After the opening of the museum, city officials in Prague criticized it for what they viewed to be its "disagreeable" content. This increased the popularity of the Sex Machines Museum among tourists.

== See also ==
- History of erotic depictions
- History of human sexuality
- List of sex museums
