= Namio Harukawa =

Japanese artist (1947–2020)

- 春川 ナミオ
- Born: May 1947; Osaka Prefecture, Japan
- Died: April 24, 2020 (aged 72)
- Known for: Erotic illustration

Namio Harukawa (春川ナミオ, Harukawa Namio; May 1947 – 24 April 2020) was a pseudonymous Japanese fetish artist best known for his works depicting female domination ("femdom"). Common subjects and motifs of his art include erotic asphyxiation, facesitting, voluptuous women, and men being used as human furniture.

== Biography ==
Harukawa was born in May 1947 in Osaka Prefecture, Japan. As a teenager he began contributing artwork to Kitan Club, a post-war pulp magazine that published sadomasochistic artwork and prose. He took the pen name "Namio Harukawa" from an anagram of "Naomi", a reference to Jun'ichirō Tanizaki's novel of the same name, and the last name of actress Masumi Harukawa. He went on to draw for other SM magazines, including SM Collector, and for many years combined his art with another job before working on it full time, adding packaging illustrations for adult videos to his magazine work.

Though he worked in specialist magazines for most of his career, from the early 2000s his work was increasingly exhibited and published. His admirers included Shūji Terayama, Oniroku Dan and Madonna; in March 2016 Madonna posted one of his drawings on Instagram, calling it "one of my favorites". His work has been compared to that of Robert Crumb.

Kyonyū Katsuai, a two-volume book of Harukawa's works, has been published in Japan. Two volumes of works by Harukawa have been published by French publishing house United Dead Artists: Callipyge, the first book of works by Harukawa published outside Japan, and Maxi Cula in 2012. Works by Harukawa were exhibited at the Museum of Eroticism in Paris in 2013, his first solo exhibition outside Japan. The exhibition featured 71 works by Harukawa, 59 of which were from his Garden of Domina series. The Incredible Femdom Art of Namio Harukawa, an anthology of Harukawa's works, was published by Kawade Shobō Shinsha in 2019.

Harukawa died on 24 April 2020. His death was confirmed in a blog post by Yuko Kitagawa, the owner of a video production company with longstanding ties to Harukawa. A memorial exhibition was held at Vanilla Gallery in Tokyo in December 2020, and in 2022 his drawings were shown at ATM Gallery in New York.

== Style and technique ==
Harukawa worked mainly in pencil. In a statement published by his Tokyo gallery, he said he had tried pens, brushes and other tools, but "in the end I went back to pencil". Many of his drawings are in black and white, but some are coloured: the drawings for Garden of Domina, on Kent paper, are in both black and white and colour, and others are in graphite and coloured pencil, at slightly smaller than letter size.

His women are large and glamorous, and usually nonchalant, smoking, drinking or reading as they sit on the men. Alex Jovanovich wrote in Artforum that "whether they're nurses, teachers, strippers, or schoolgirls, they are all queens". The men are small and puny, often nude or in their underwear, and are used as human furniture; sometimes, as Agnès Giard wrote, only the balding skull of the little man can still be seen. Bondage and facesitting also appear frequently in his art.
