= Erotic Art Museum (Hamburg) =

Museum dedicated to erotic art in Hamburg, Germany

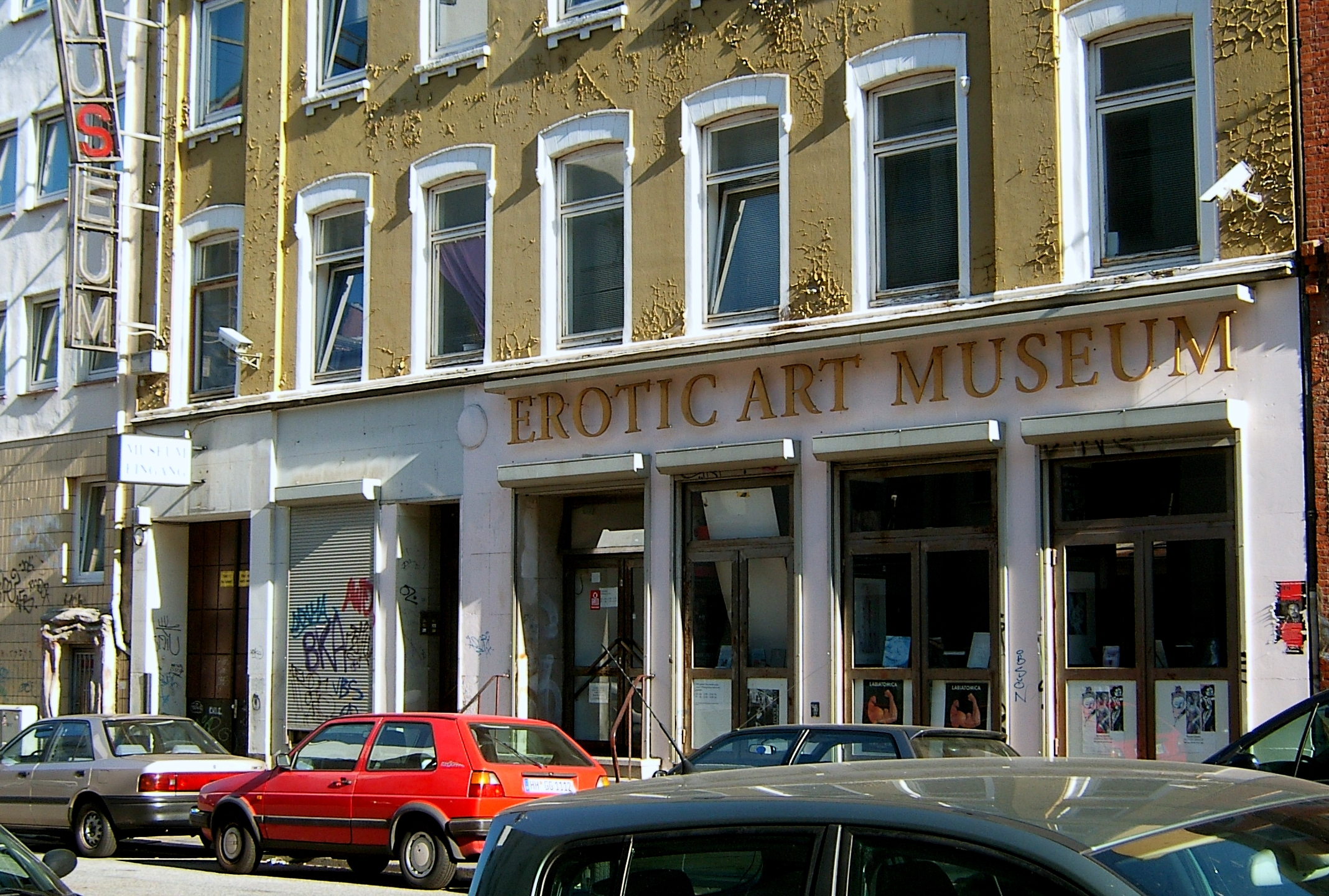

- Location within Hamburg Location within Germany
- Location: 69 Bernhard-Nocht-Straße, Hamburg, Germany
- Coordinates: 53°32′49″N 9°57′41″E
- Website: EroticArtMuseum.de

The Erotic Art Museum is a museum dedicated to erotic art located in the German red-light district of Hamburg's Reeperbahn. The museum opened in November 1992 at 69 Bernhard-Nocht-Straße, and in 1997 it moved to Nobistor, a street running between the Reeperbahn and Louise-Schroeder-Straße. The museum closed in fall 2007. In 2018, the museum reopened.

== See also ==
- List of museums and cultural institutions in Hamburg
